= Xilin Chan Temple =

Buddhist temple in Shanghai, China

- 西林禅寺
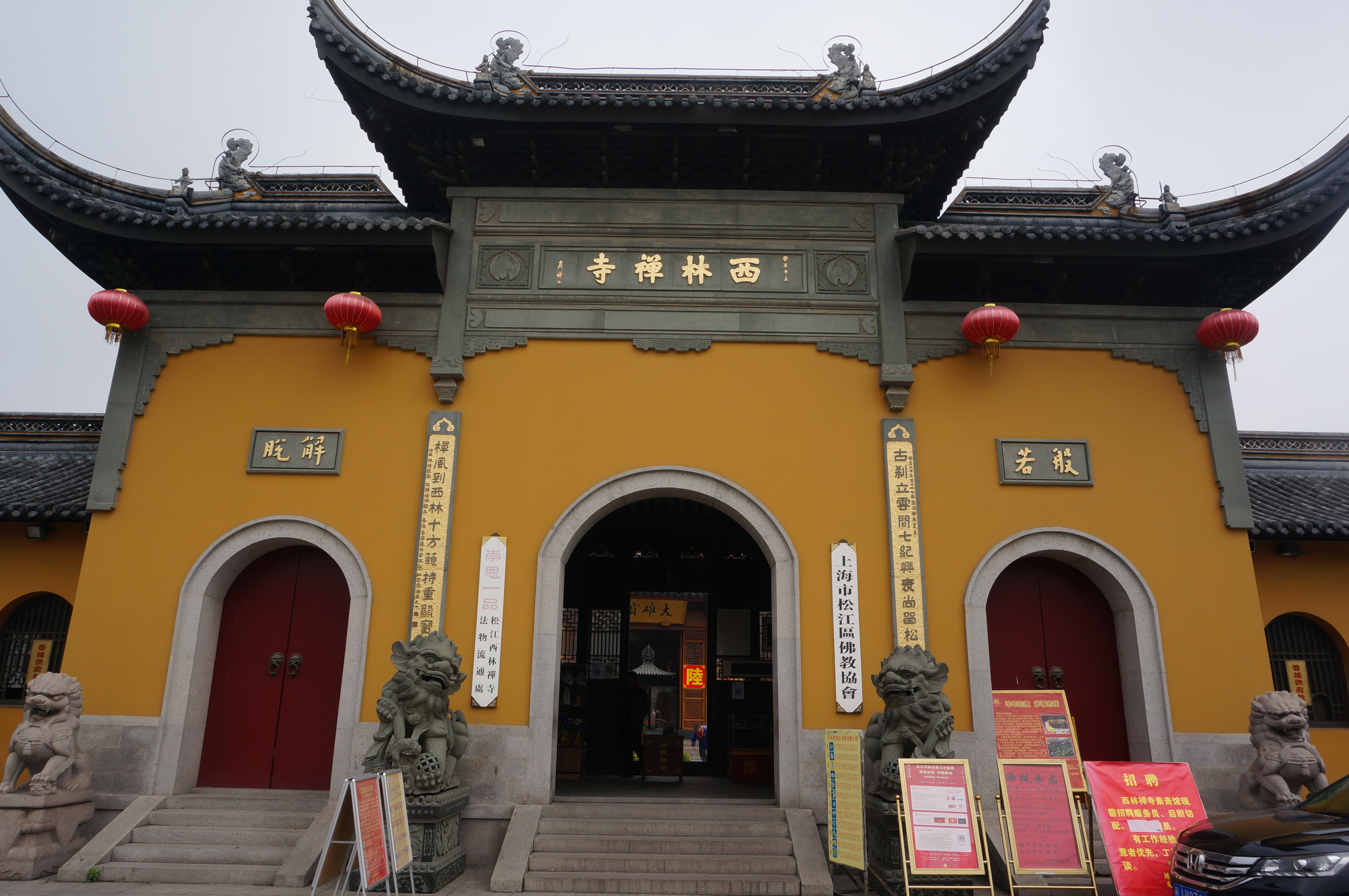
- The shanmen of Xilin Chan Temple.

- Location within Shanghai

Religion
- Affiliation: Buddhism
- Sect: Chan Buddhism
- Leadership: Shi Wuduan (释悟端)

Location
- Location: Yueyang Subdistrict, Songjiang District, Shanghai
- Country: China
- Coordinates: 31°00′48″N 121°13′50″E

Architecture
- Style: Chinese architecture
- Founder: Hu Zengchu (胡曾初)
- Established: 872
- Completed: 1986–2003 (reconstruction)

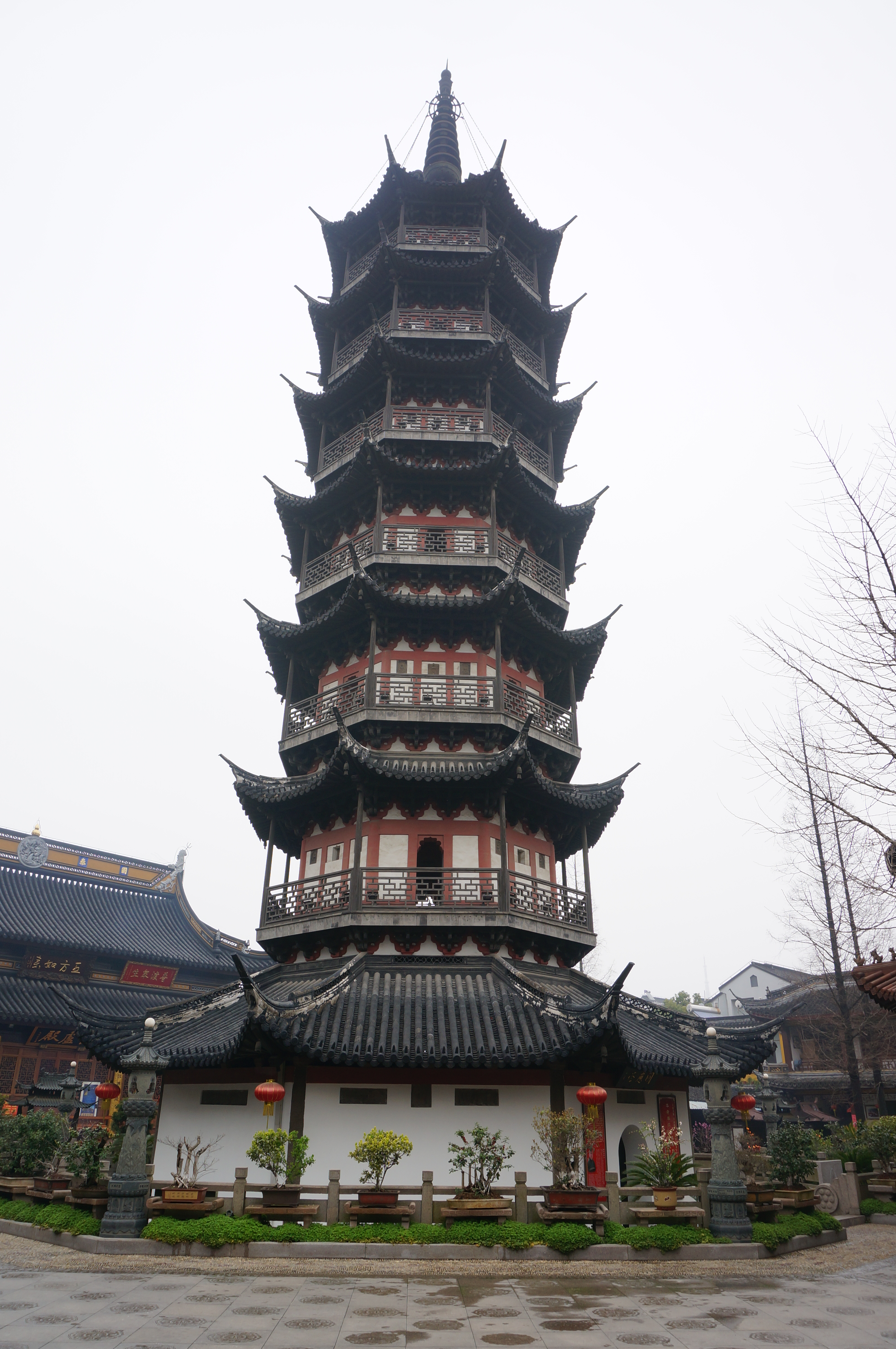
The Yuanying Pagoda.

Xilin Chan Temple (simplified Chinese: 西林禅寺; traditional Chinese: 西林禪寺; pinyin: Xilin Chan Sì) is a Buddhist temple located in Yueyang Subdistrict, Songjiang District of Shanghai. The modern temple was built between 1986 and 2003.

== History ==
The temple traces its origins to the former "Xilin Vihara" (西林精舍), founded by Hu Zengchu (胡曾初) in 872, in the ruling of Yizong Emperor of the Tang dynasty (618–907). Originally known as "Jiedai Temple" (接待院; 'Reception Temple') in the Southern Song dynasty (1127–1279), and later renamed "Ting'en Temple" (廷恩寺) and "Chong'en Temple" (崇恩寺), Yingzong Emperor of Ming dynasty (1368–1644) inscribed and honored the name "Xilin Chan Temple of Great Ming" in the mid-15th century. The temple was destroyed by fire during the Mongolian invasion of the 13th century, and was restored and reconstructed in 1387, at the dawn of Ming dynasty.

The temple became dilapidated for neglect during the Republic of China (1912–1949). It was devastated by the Red Guards during the ten-year Cultural Revolution. After the 3rd Plenary Session of the 11th Central Committee of the Chinese Communist Party, according to the national policy of free religious belief, Xilin Chan Temple was officially reopened to the public. In 1992, abbot Shi Xingxiu (释性修) supervised the reconstruction of Kunlu Hall and Mahavira Hall.

== Architecture ==
Along the central axis of the temple stand four buildings including the Shanmen, Mahavira Hall, Yuanying Pagoda (圆应塔) and Kunlu Hall (昆卢殿), which were completed between 1986 and 2003.

=== Yuanying Pagoda ===
Octahedral in shape, it has seven stories with the height of 46.5-metre (153 ft). It is made of brick and stone. The Song dynasty (960–1279) Chinese pagoda was built in memory of Chan master Yuanying (圆应).

== Gallery ==
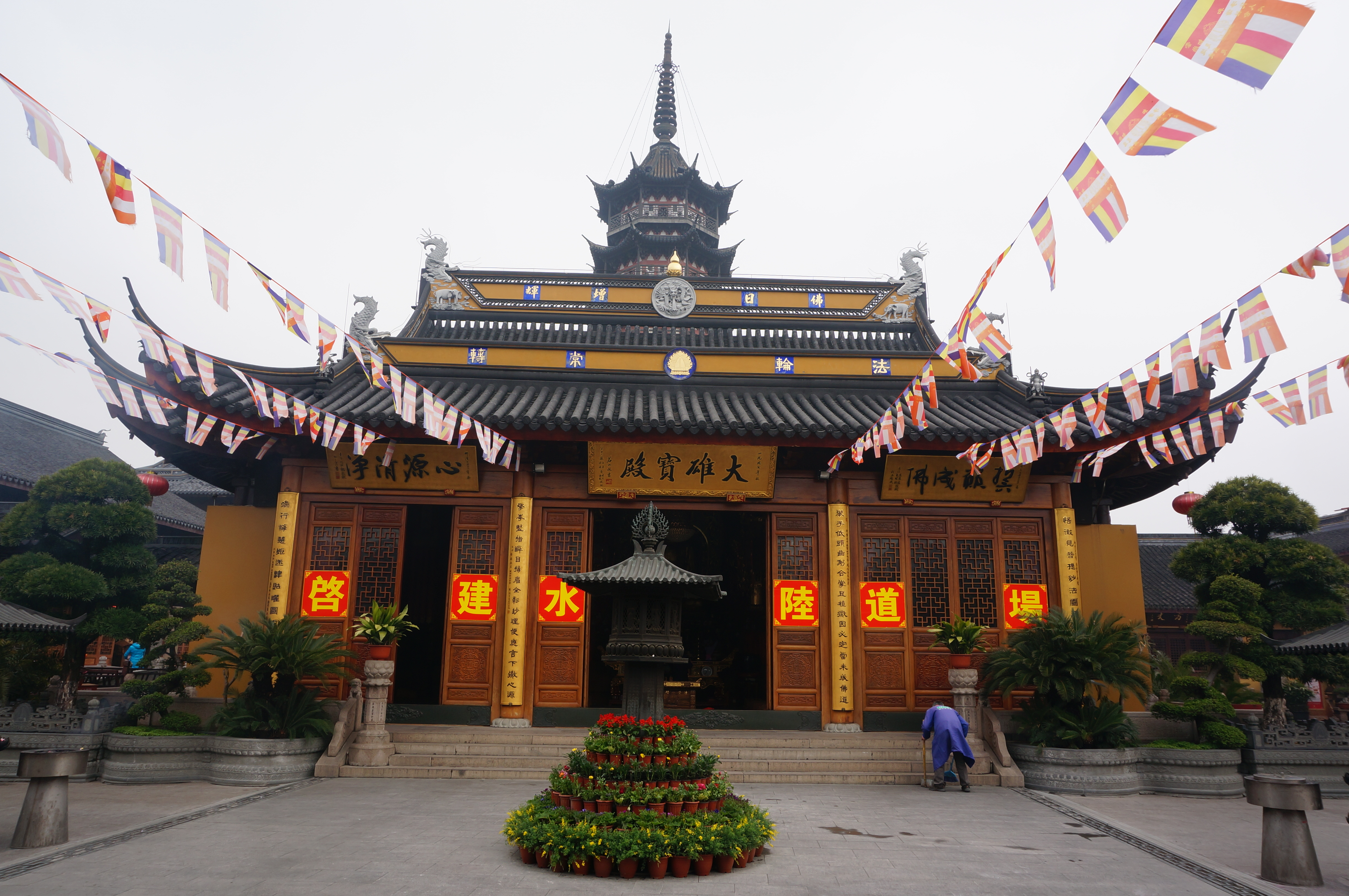
The Mahavira Hall.

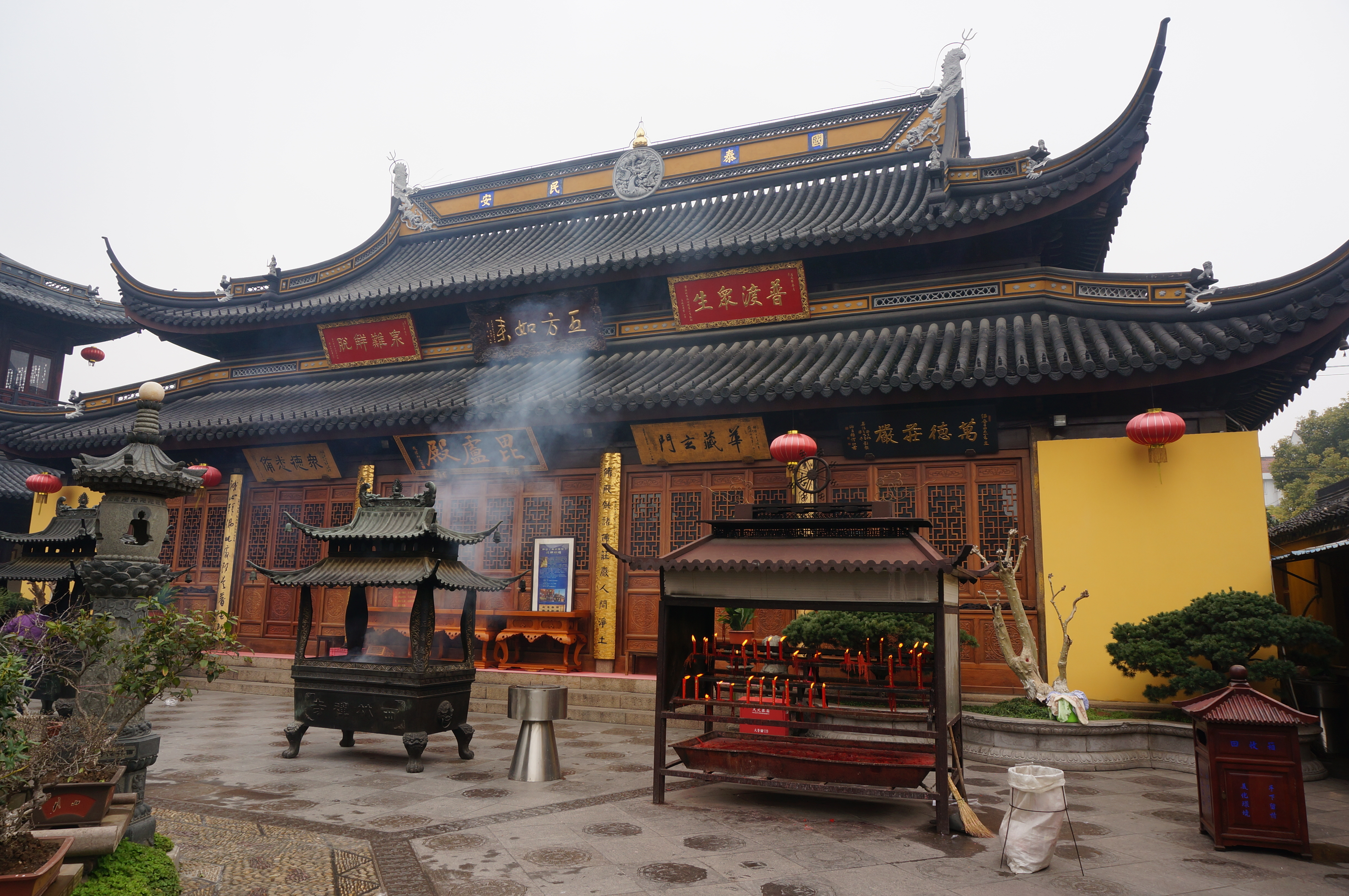
The Kunlu Hall.

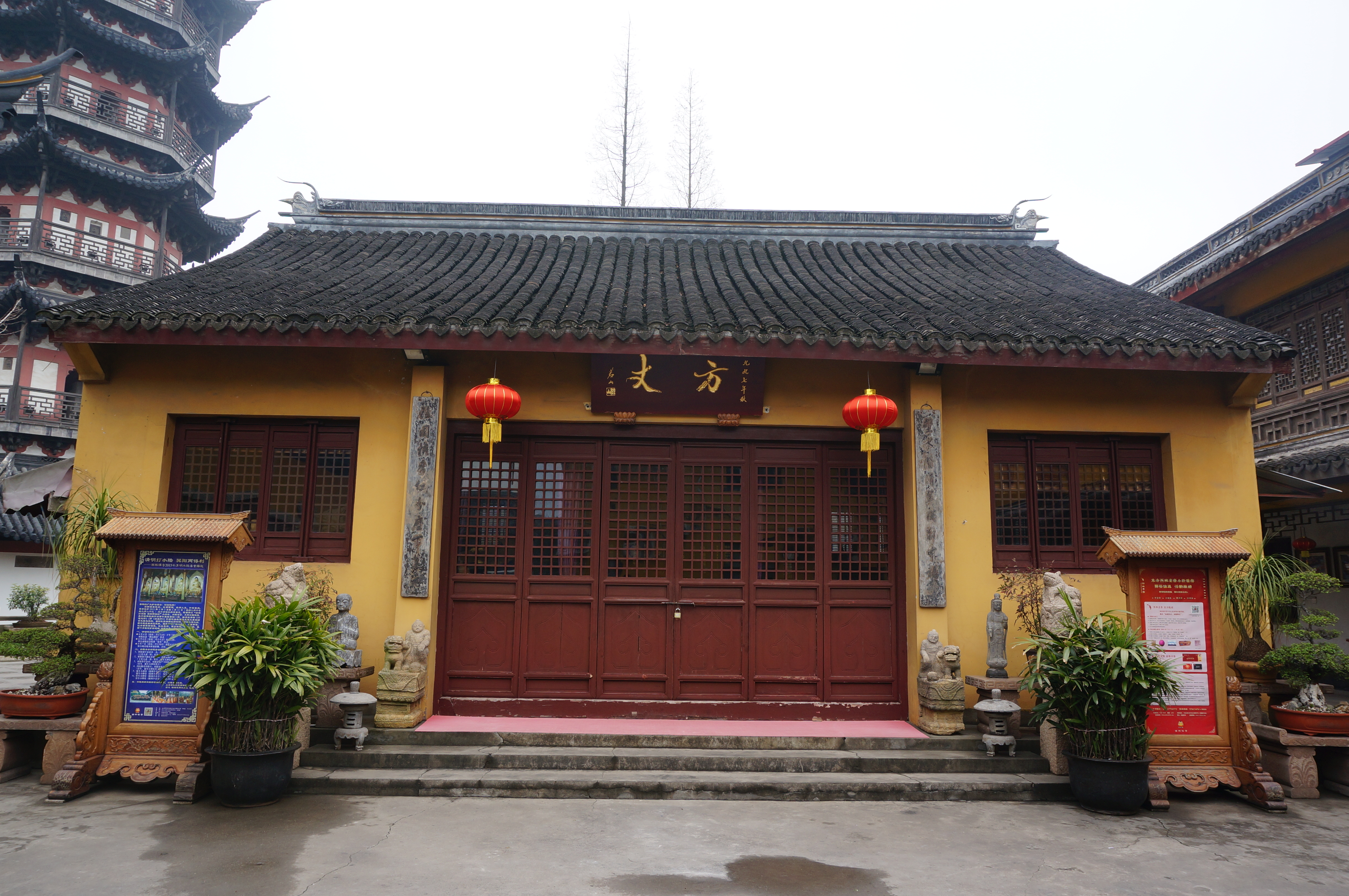
The Abbot's Room.
