= Mituo Temple =

Buddhist temple in Hangzhou, China

- 弥陀寺
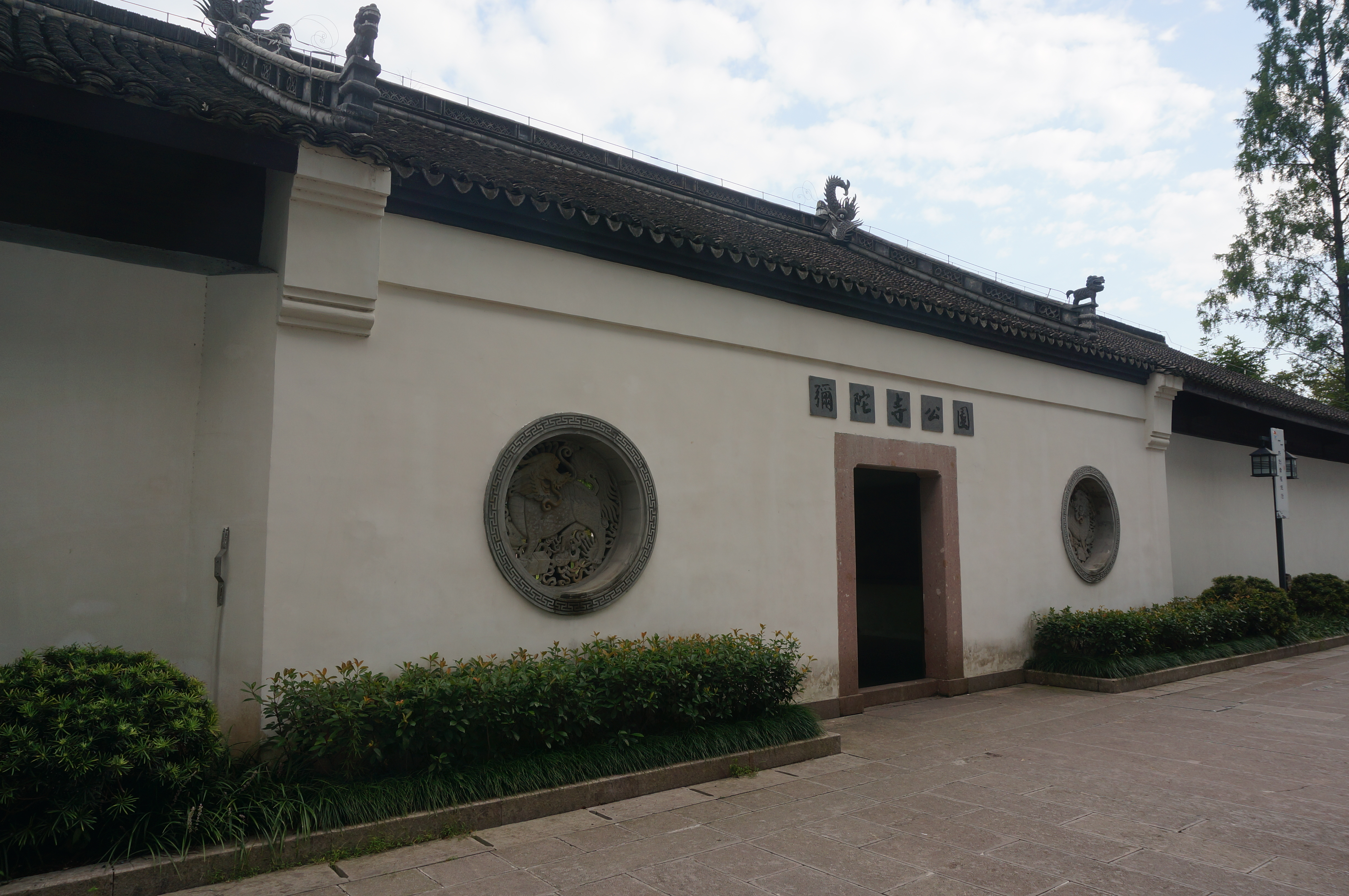
- The shanmen of Mituo Temple.

- Location within Zhejiang

Religion
- Affiliation: Buddhism
- Deity: Pure Land Buddhism

Location
- Location: Xihu District, Hangzhou, Zhejiang
- Country: China
- Interactive map of Mituo Temple
- Coordinates: 30°16′24″N 120°09′27″E

Architecture
- Style: Chinese architecture
- Established: 1878

Mituo Temple (simplified Chinese: 弥陀寺; traditional Chinese: 彌陀寺; pinyin: Mítuó Sì; lit. 'Maitreya Temple') is a former Buddhist temple located in Xihu District of Hangzhou, Zhejiang.

== History ==
Mituo Temple was first built in 1878, in the ruling of Guangxu Emperor (1875–1908) of the Qing dynasty (1644–1911). After the founding of the Communist State in 1949, it was used as school, factory and residential building. In 2005 it has been listed among the second group of "Historical Buildings in Hangzhou" by Hangzhou government. It was officially opened to the public in July 2016 after a modern renovation. It is no longer used as a religious building.

== Architecture ==
Along the central axis of the temple stand three buildings including the Shanmen, Giant Buddha Hall and Stone Sutra Pavilion. Subsidiary structures were built on both sides of the central axis including wing-room, dining room and bedroom. The Amitabha Sutra was carved on the wall of the Stone Sutra Pavilion (Chinese: 石经阁). It is the largest existing cliff stone carving in Hangzhou.

== Gallery ==
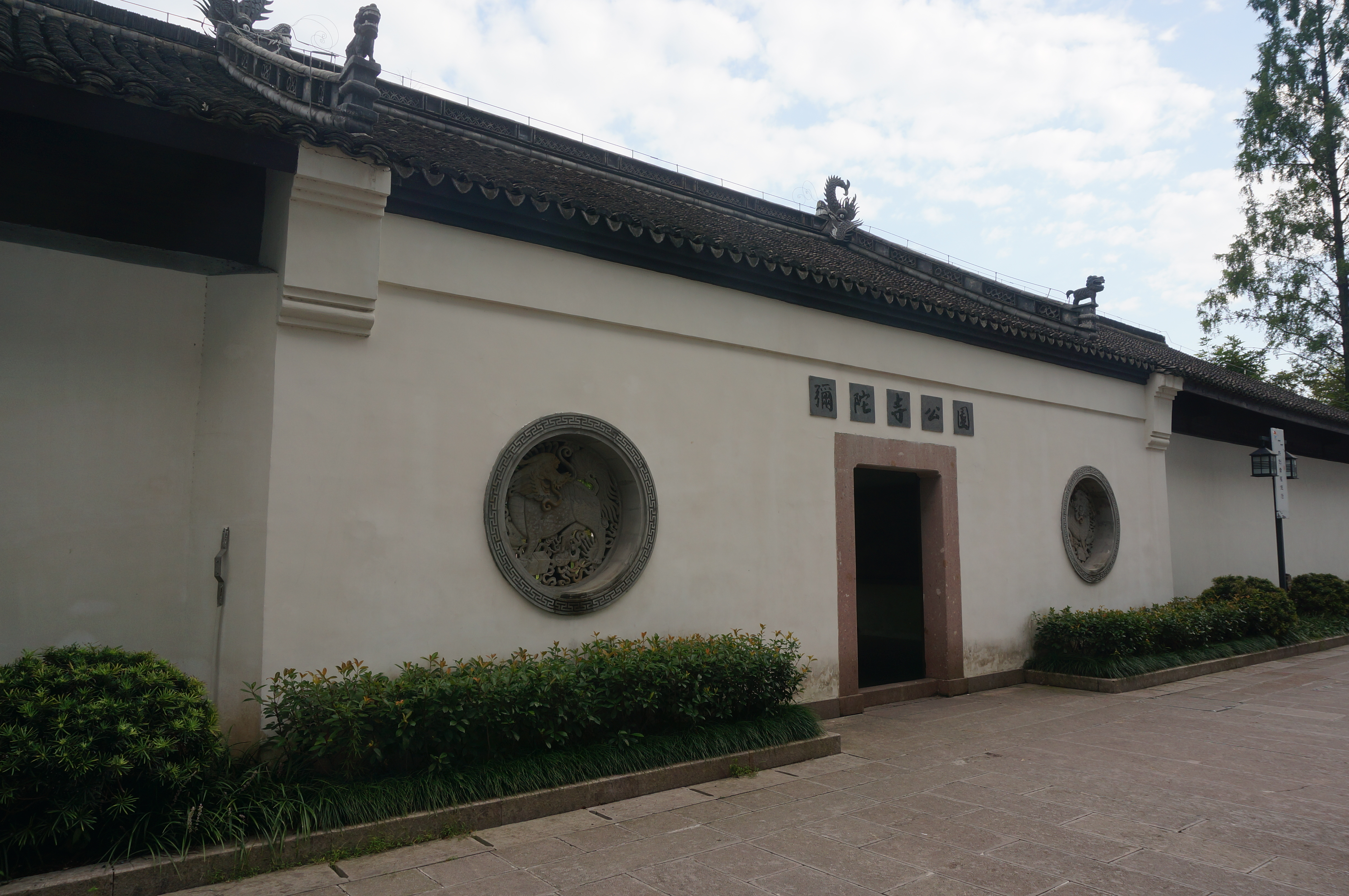
The shanmen.

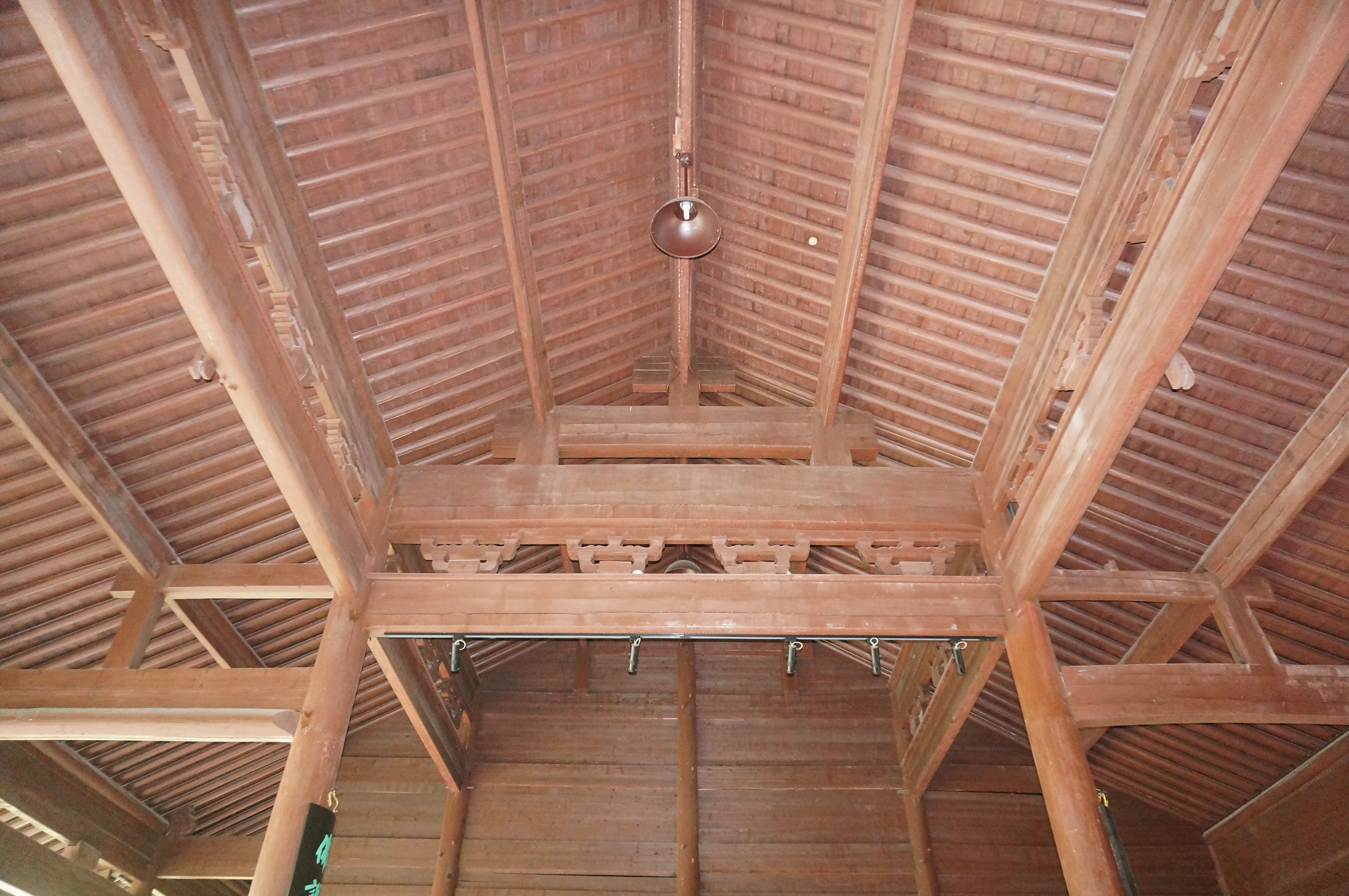
The beam frame of shanmen.

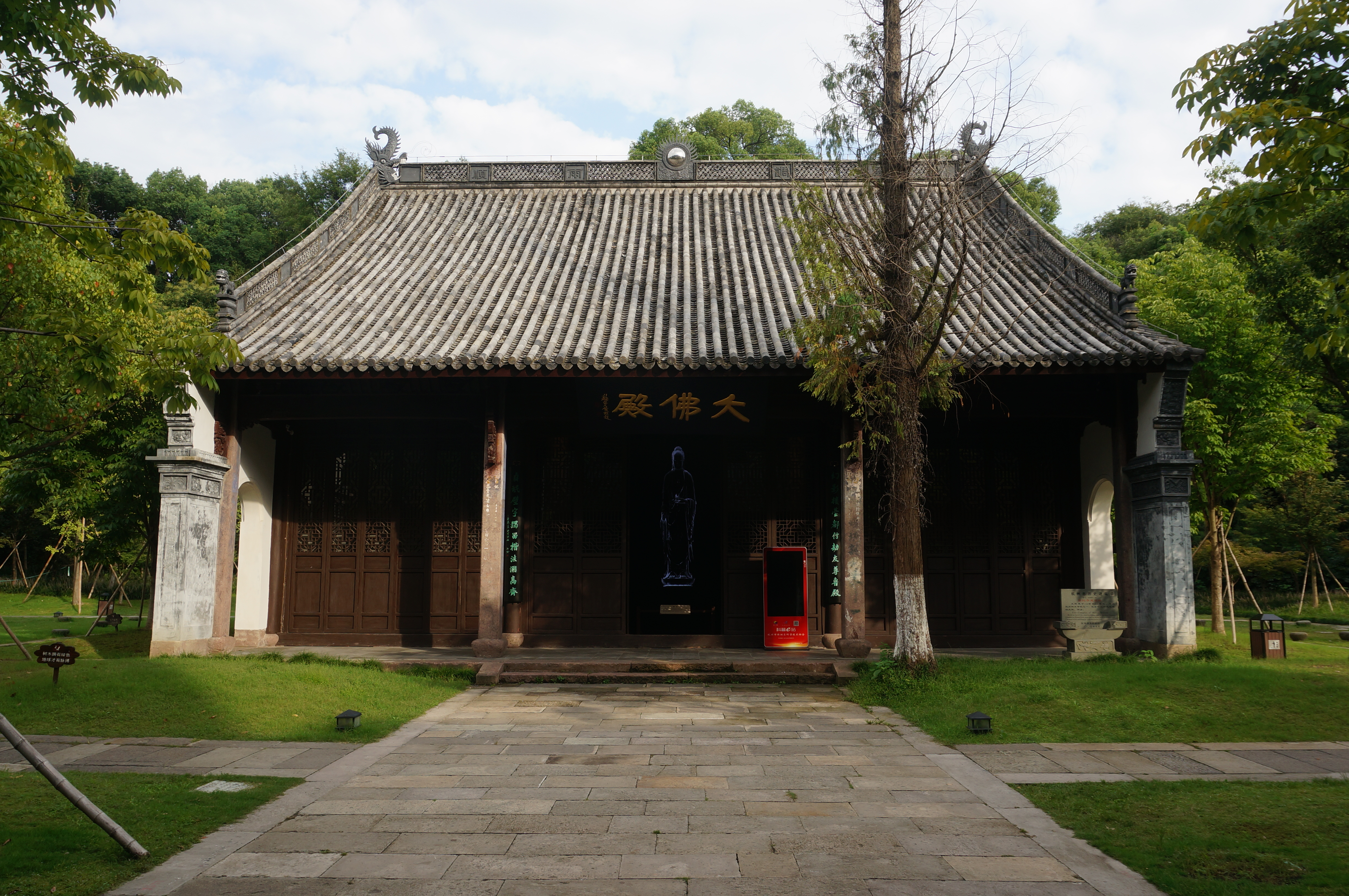
The Giant Buddha Hall.

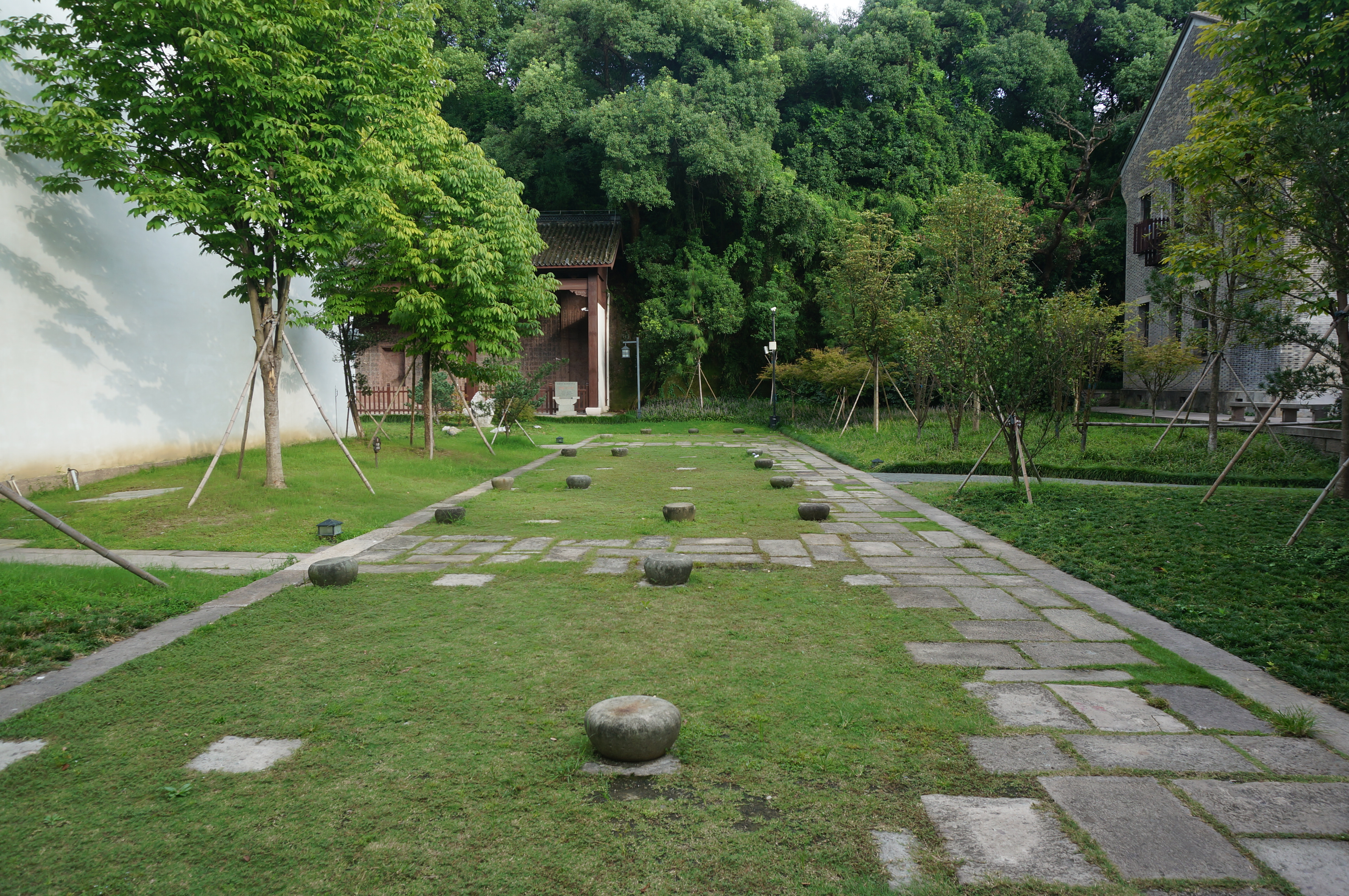
Site of wing-room.

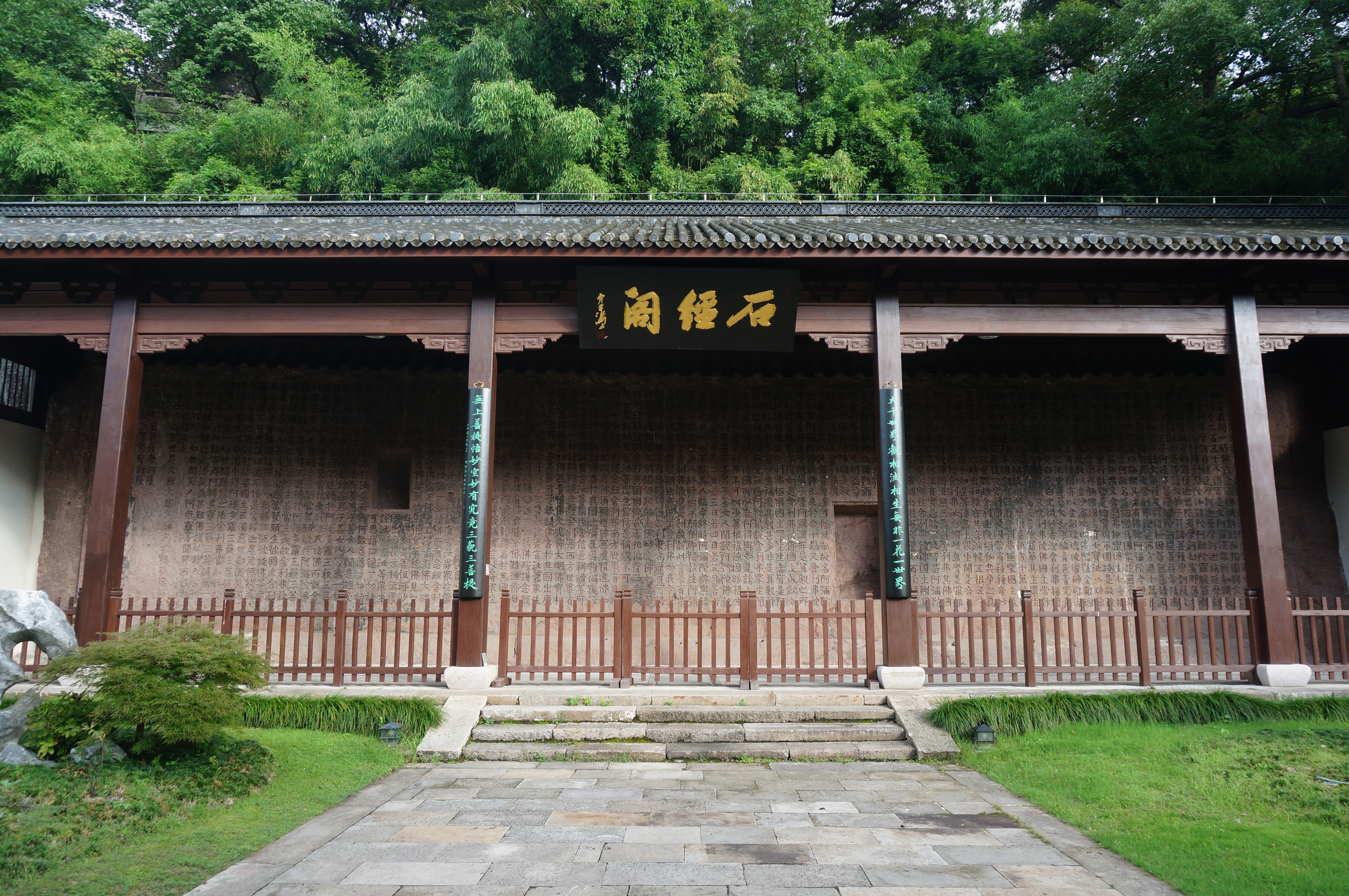
Stone Sutra Pavilion

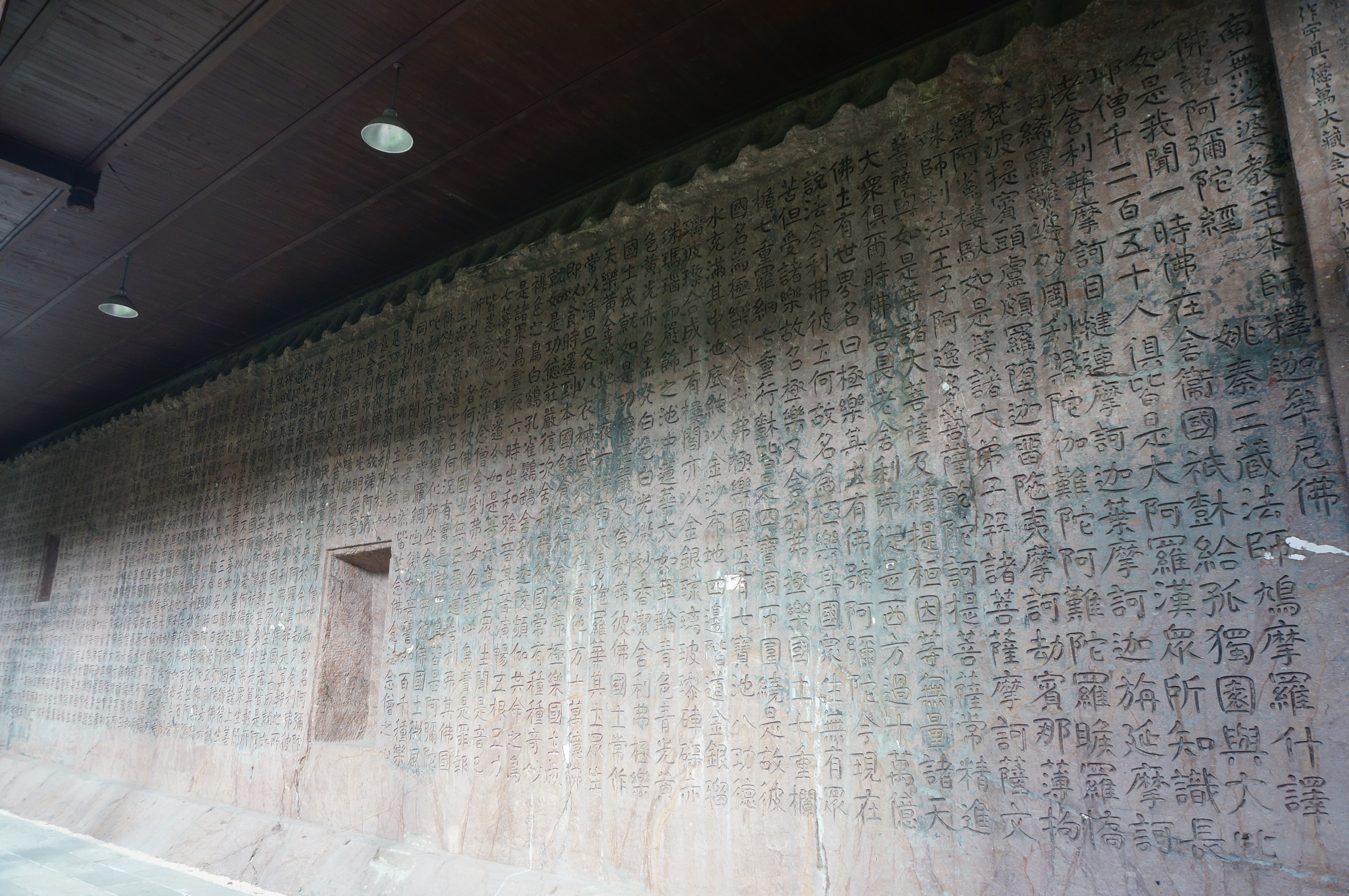
Stone carving of Amitabha Sutra.

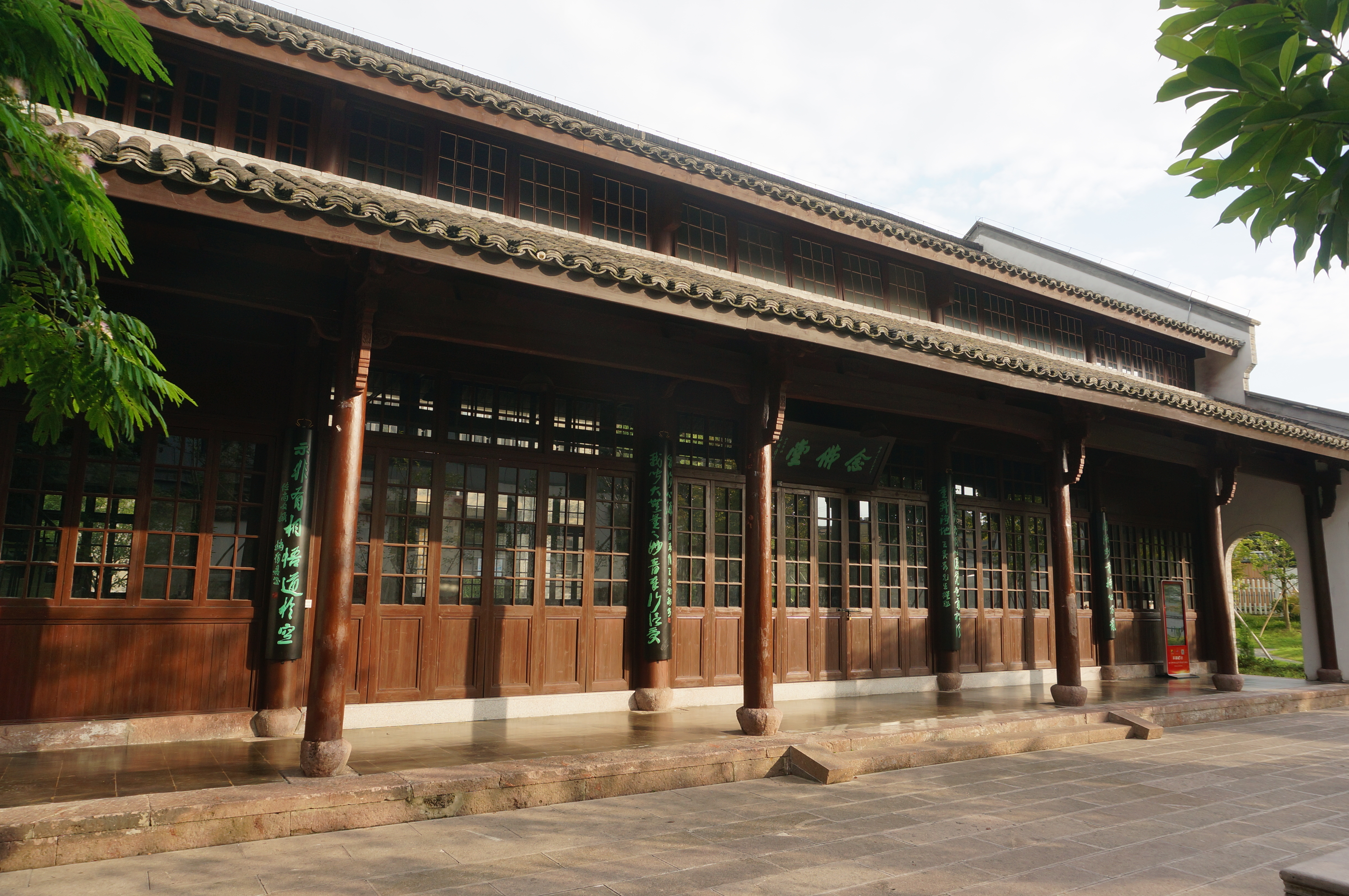
Recitation Hall.

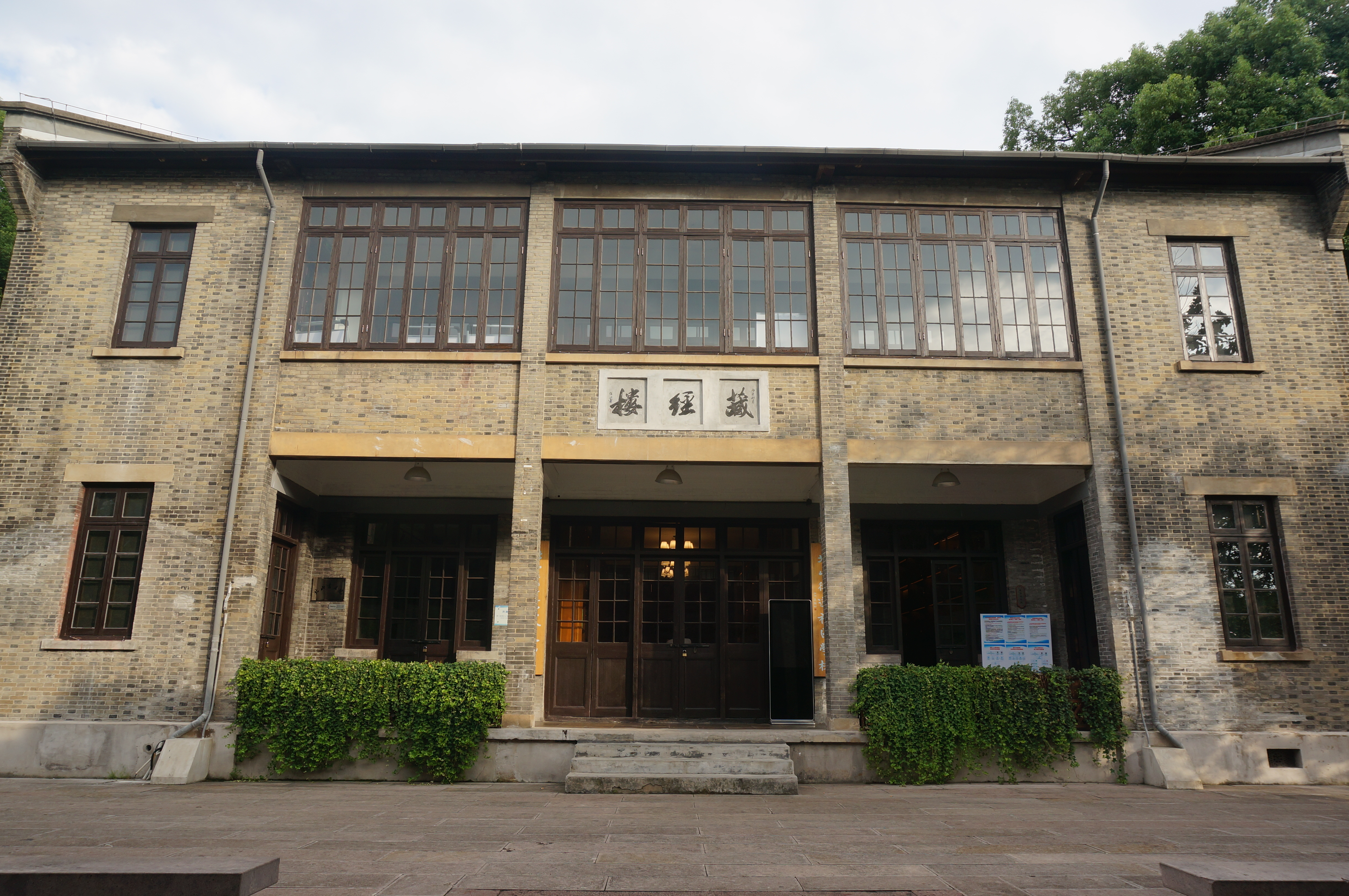
Buddhist Texts Library.
