= Nio (Buddhism) =

Guardians of the Buddha

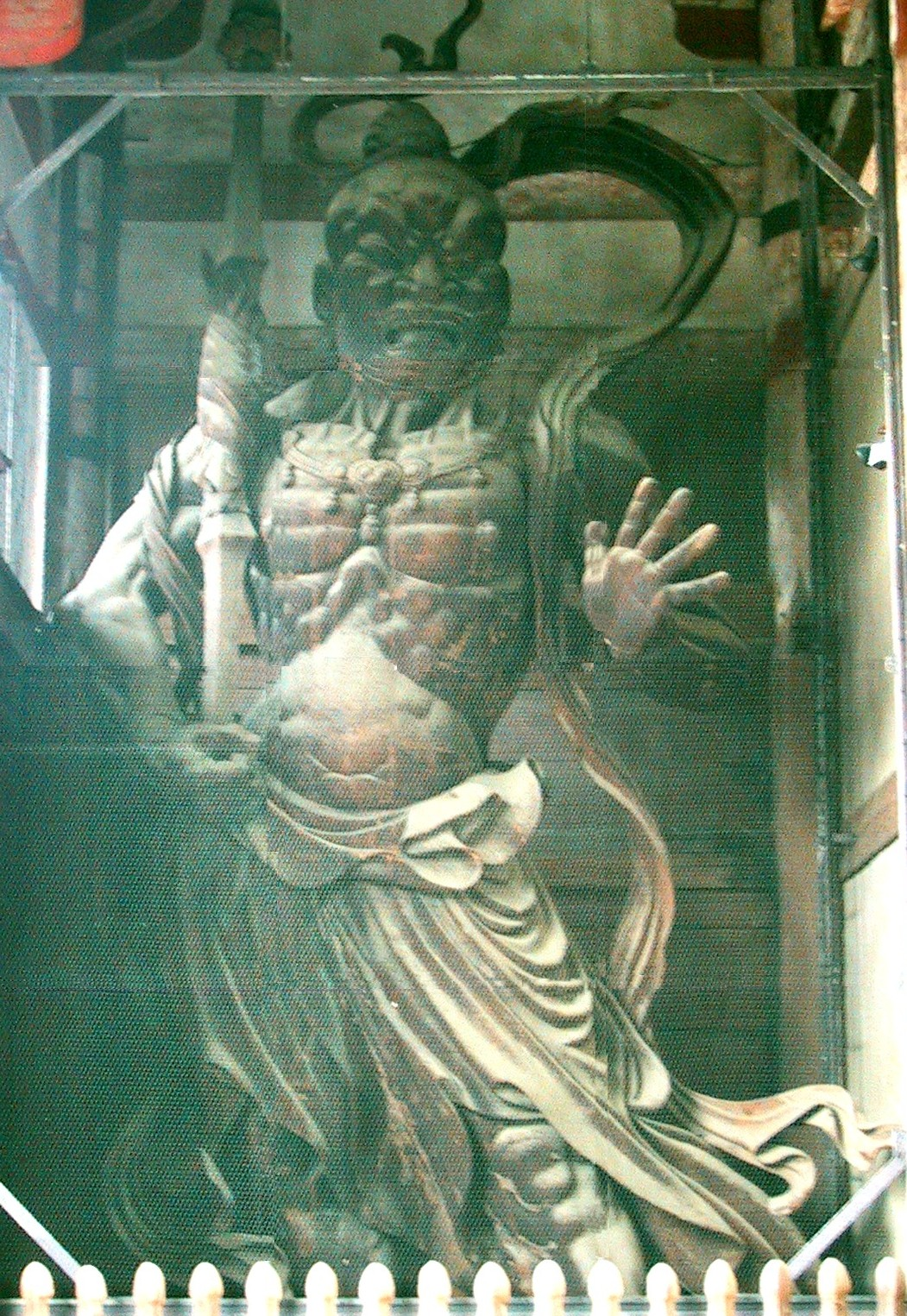
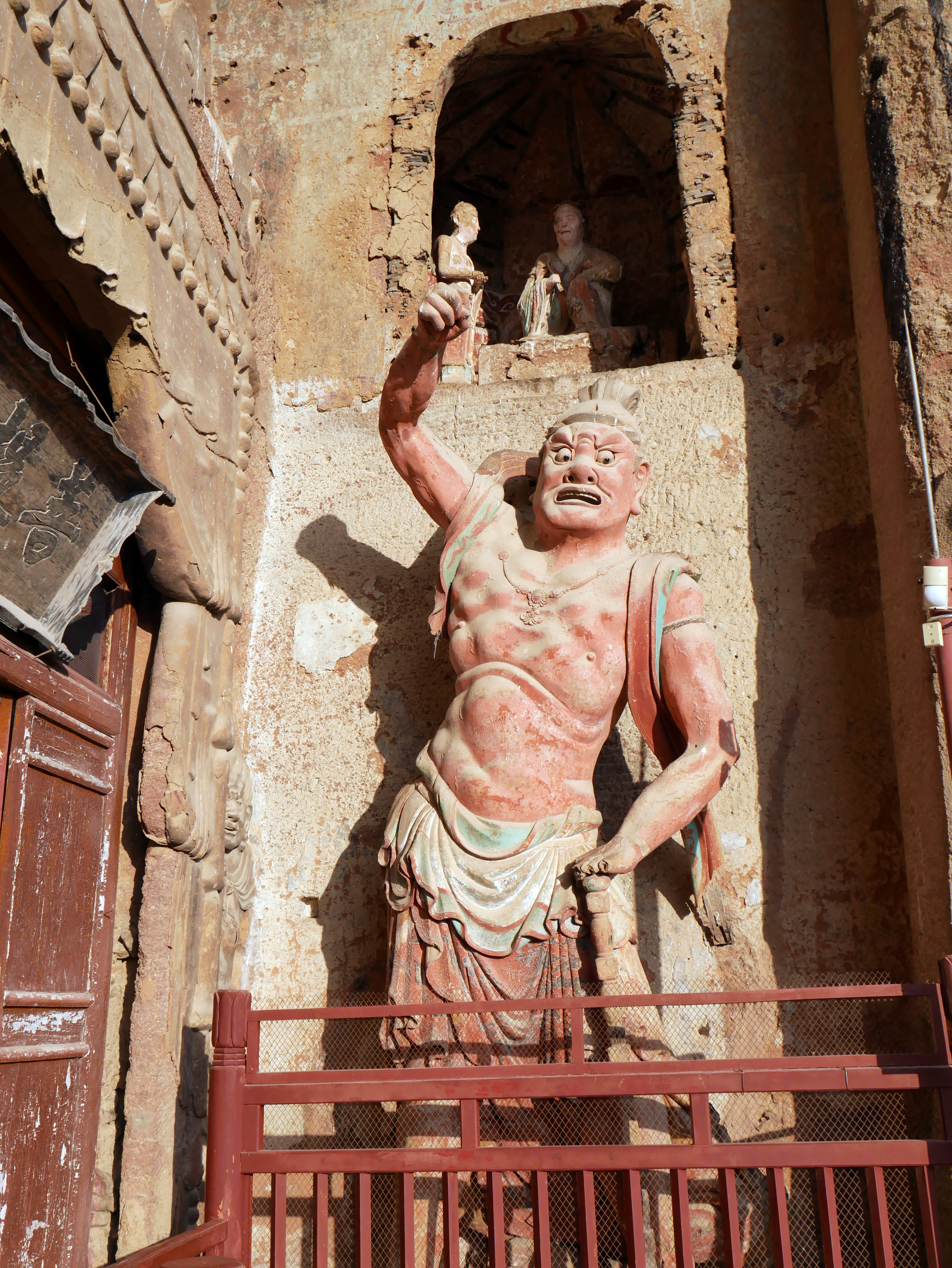
- The wooden Guhyapāda Nio at Todai Temple in Nara, Japan, made by Unkei & Kaikei in 1203 A stone Renwang in the Maijishan Grottoes in Tianshui, China, carved during the Song dynasty (960–1279)

Renwang
- Chinese: 仁王
- Literal meaning: King(s) of Benevolence; Benevolent King(s)
Transcriptions
Standard Mandarin
- Hanyu Pinyin: Rénwáng
- Wade–Giles: Jen-wang

Tianwang
- Chinese: 天王
- Literal meaning: Deva King(s); Heavenly King(s)
Transcriptions
Standard Mandarin
- Hanyu Pinyin: Tiānwáng
- Wade–Giles: T'ien-wang

Korean name
- Hangul: 인왕
- Hanja: 仁王
Transcriptions
- Revised Romanization: Inwang
- McCune–Reischauer: Inwang

Japanese name
- Kanji: 仁王
- Hiragana: におう
Transcriptions
- Romanization: Niō

Niō (in Japanese contexts) or Inwang (in Korean contexts) or Renwang (in Chinese contexts) or Nhân vương (in Vietnamese contexts), also known as the Deva or Benevolent Kings, are two wrathful and muscular guardians of the Buddha standing today at the entrance of many Buddhist temples in East Asian Buddhism in the form of frightening wrestler-like statues. They are dharmapala manifestations of the bodhisattva Vajrapāṇi, the oldest and most powerful of the Mahayana Buddhist pantheon. According to scriptures like the Pāli Canon as well as the Ambaṭṭha Sutta, they travelled with Gautama Buddha to protect him. Within the generally pacifist tradition of Buddhism, stories of dharmapalas justified the use of physical force to protect cherished values and beliefs against evil. They are also seen as a manifestation of Mahasthamaprapta, the bodhisattva of power that flanks Amitābha in Pure Land Buddhism and as Vajrasattva in Tibetan Buddhism.

== Manifestations ==
=== Symbolic meaning ===
They are usually portrayed as a pair of figures that stand guarding the main temple entrance gates, usually called shanmen (山門) in China, niōmon (仁王門) in Japan, and geumgangmun (金剛門) in Korea. In Sanskrit, the right statue is known as Guhyapāda. He traditionally has his mouth open, representing the vocalization of the first grapheme of Sanskrit Devanāgarī (अ, "a"). The left statue is Nārāyaṇa. He traditionally has his mouth closed, representing the vocalization of the last grapheme of Devanāgarī (ह, "[ɦ]"), read "ɦūṃ" (हूँ). These two characters together (a-hūṃ/a-un) symbolize the birth and death of all things. (Men are supposedly born speaking the "a" sound with mouths open and die speaking an "ɦūṃ" and mouths closed.) Similar to Jaya-Vijaya, they signify "everything" or "all creation". The contraction of both is the mantra om (ॐ).

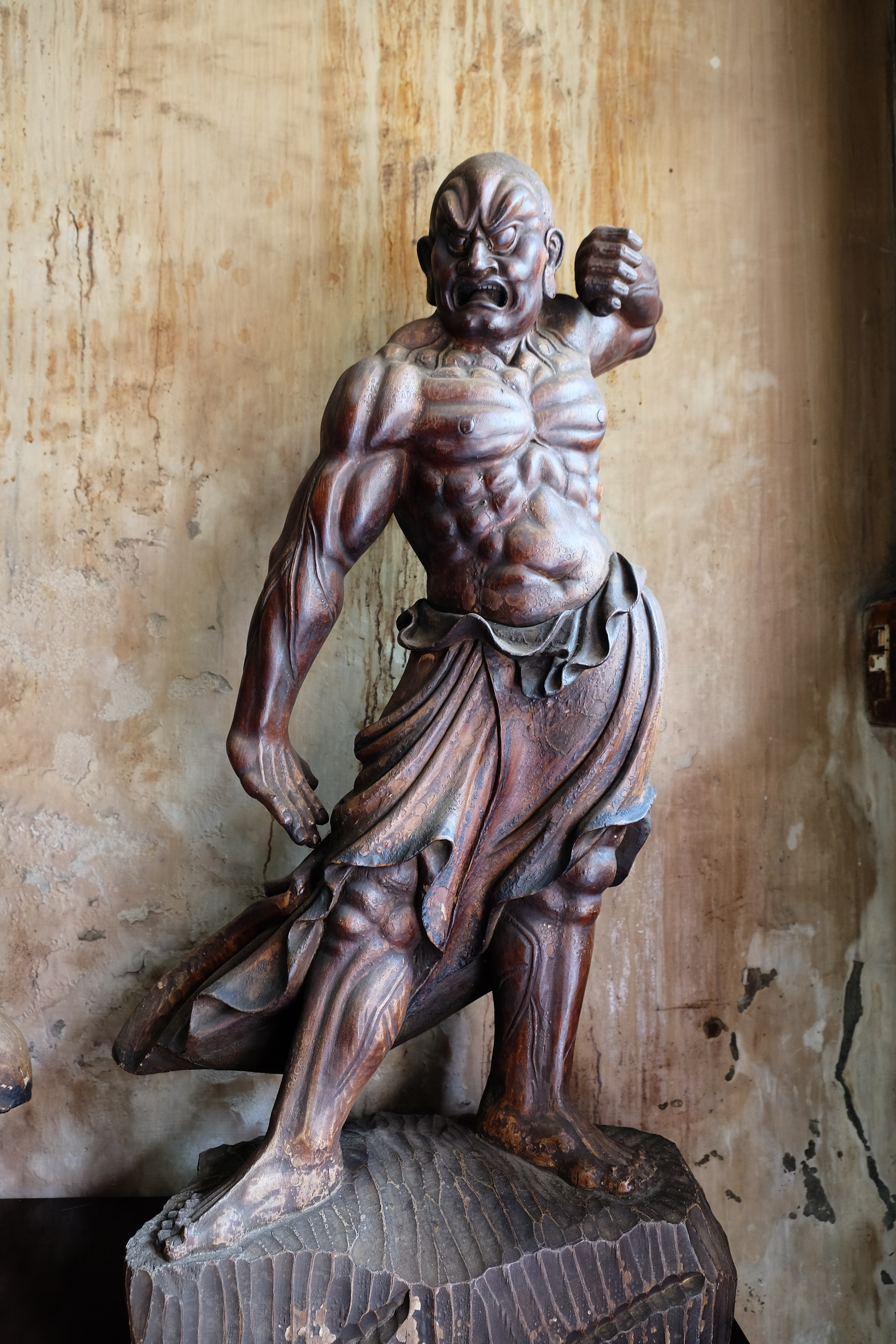
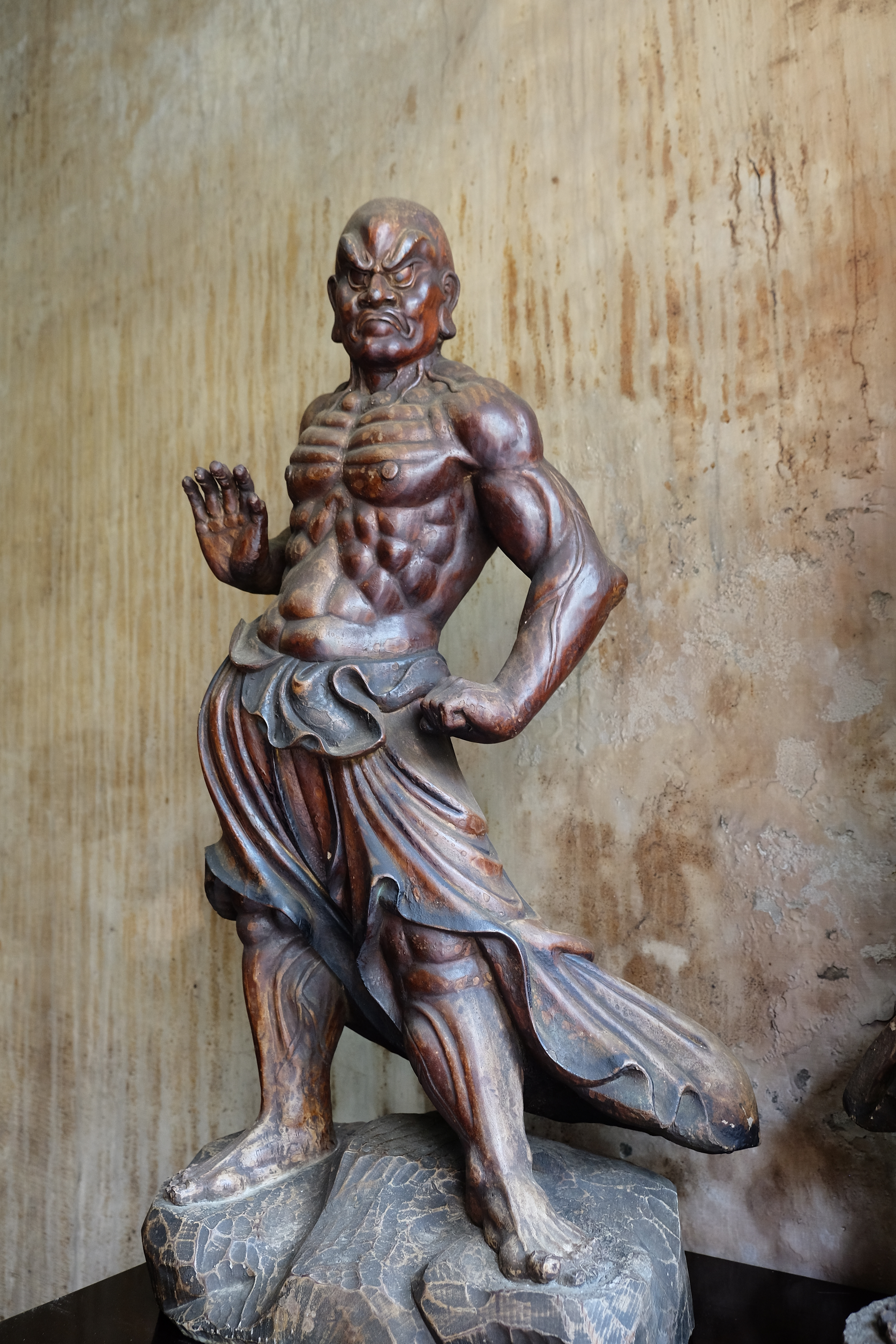
Generals Ha and Heng at the Cisheng Temple in Dadaocheng, Taipei, Taiwan

=== Guhyapāda ===
Guhyapāda (Traditional Chinese: 密迹金剛; simplified Chinese: 密迹金刚; pinyin: Mìjī jīngāng; Japanese: Misshaku Kongō; Korean: Miljeok geumgang; Vietnamese: Mật tích kim cương ) is a symbol of overt violence: he wields a vajra mallet "vajra-pāṇi" (a diamond club, thunderbolt stick, or sun symbol) and bares his teeth. His mouth is depicted as being in the shape necessary to form the "ha" or "ah" sound. In China, he is also known as General Ha (哈将 Hā Jiāng) in reference to this iconographic detail. Similarly, he is also known as Agyō (阿形, "a"-form, general term open-mouthed statues in aum pair) in Japan due to this detail as well. In Chinese Buddhism, Guhyapāda is regarded as one of the Twenty-Four Protective Deities, who are a grouping of dharmapalas often enshrined in the Daxiong of temples and monasteries. In addition, Guhyapāda is also sometimes paired or identified with the Wisdom King Ucchuṣma, who is commonly known in Chinese as Huiji Jingang (穢跡金剛).

=== Nārāyaṇa ===
Nārāyaṇa (Traditional Chinese: 那羅延金剛; simplified Chinese: 那罗延金刚; pinyin: Nàluōyán Jīngāng; Japanese: Naraen Kongō; Korean: Narayeon geumgang; Vietnamese: Na la diên kim cương) is depicted either bare-handed or wielding a sword. He symbolizes latent strength, holding his mouth tightly shut. His mouth is rendered to form the sound "hūṃ", or "heng" or "un". In China, he is also known as General Heng (哼将 Hēng Jiāng) in reference to this iconographic detail. Similarly, he is also known as Ungyō (吽形, "um"-form, general term closed-mouthed statues in aum pair) in Japan due to this detail as well.

=== Vajrapāni ===
Both Guhyapāda and Nārāyaṇa are seen as manifestations of Vajrapāni (Traditional Chinese: 執金剛神; simplified Chinese: 执金刚神; pinyin: Zhíjīngāng shén; Japanese: Shūkongōshin; Korean: Jip geumgang sin; Vietnamese: Chấp kim cang thần), with the name literally meaning "vajra-wielding god".

== Nio Zen Buddhism ==
Nio Zen Buddhism was a practice advocated by the Zen monk Suzuki Shōsan (1579–1655), who advocated Nio Zen Buddhism over Nyorai Zen Buddhism. He recommended that practitioners should meditate on Nio and even adopt their fierce expressions and martial stances in order to cultivate power, strength and courage when dealing with adversity. Suzuki described Nio as follows: "The Niō (Vajrapani) is a menacing God. He wields the kongōsho (vajra) and he can crush your enemies. Depend on him, pray to him that he will protect you as he protects the Buddha. He vibrates with energy and spiritual power which you can absorb from him in times of need."

== Influence on Taoism ==
In Chinese folk religion and Taoism, they are known as the two generals Heng and Ha (哼哈二將, Hēng Hā èr jiàng). In the Taoist novel Fengshen Yanyi, Zheng Lun and Chen Qi were finally appointed as the two deities.

== Gallery ==
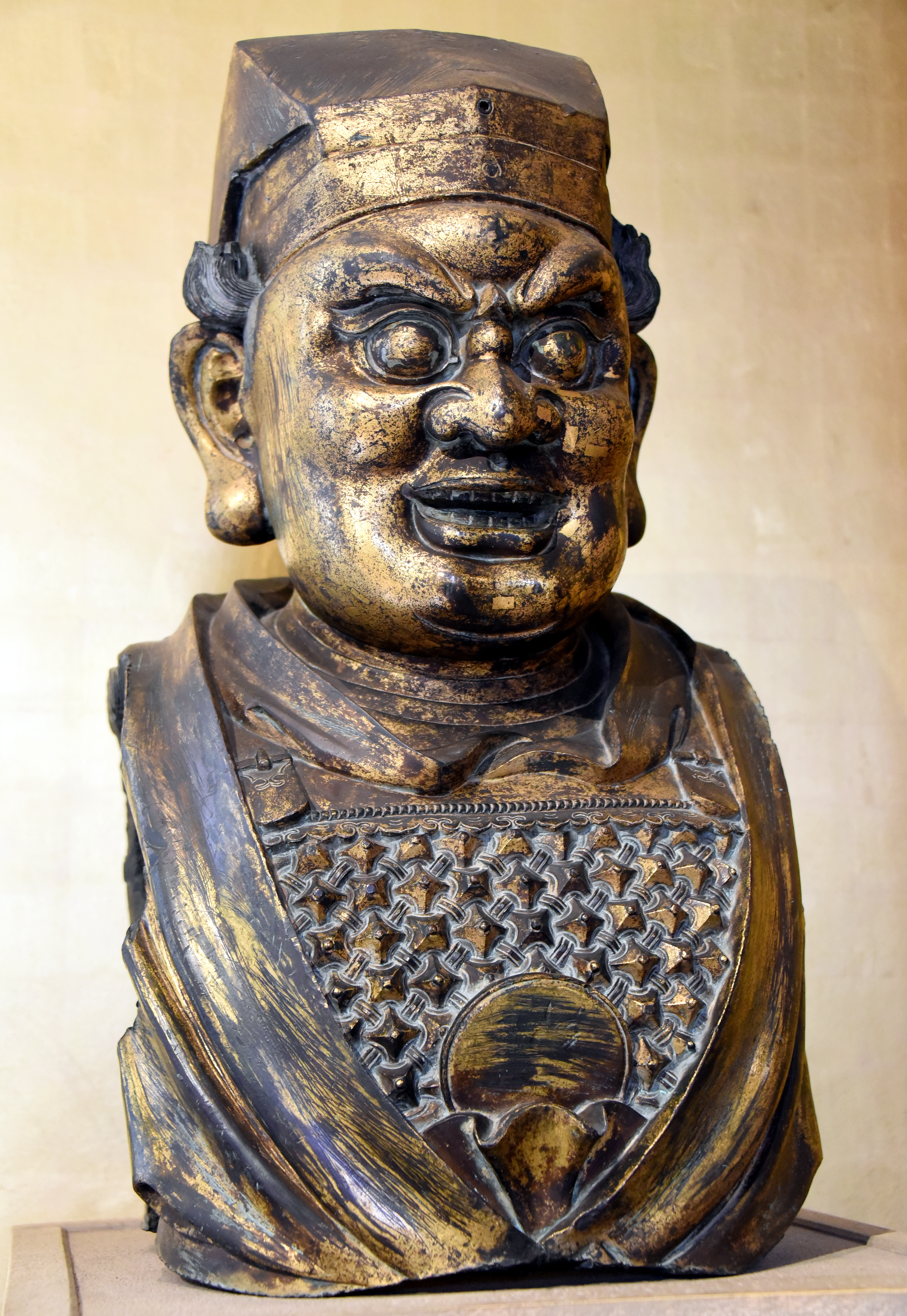
Bust of a Buddhist guardian figure, from China, Yuan Dynasty, 14th century CE. The British Museum

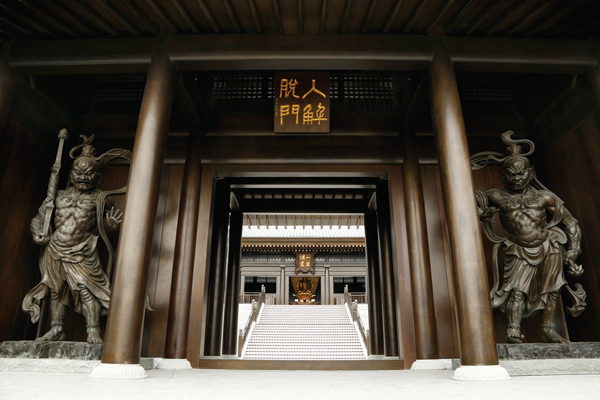
Statue of Mìjī jīngāng (Guhyapada) on the right and Nàluōyán Jīngāng (Narayana) on the left of the shanmen in Tsz Shan Monastery in Hong Kong

Narayeon Geumgang at Hwa-Eom Temple in South Korea

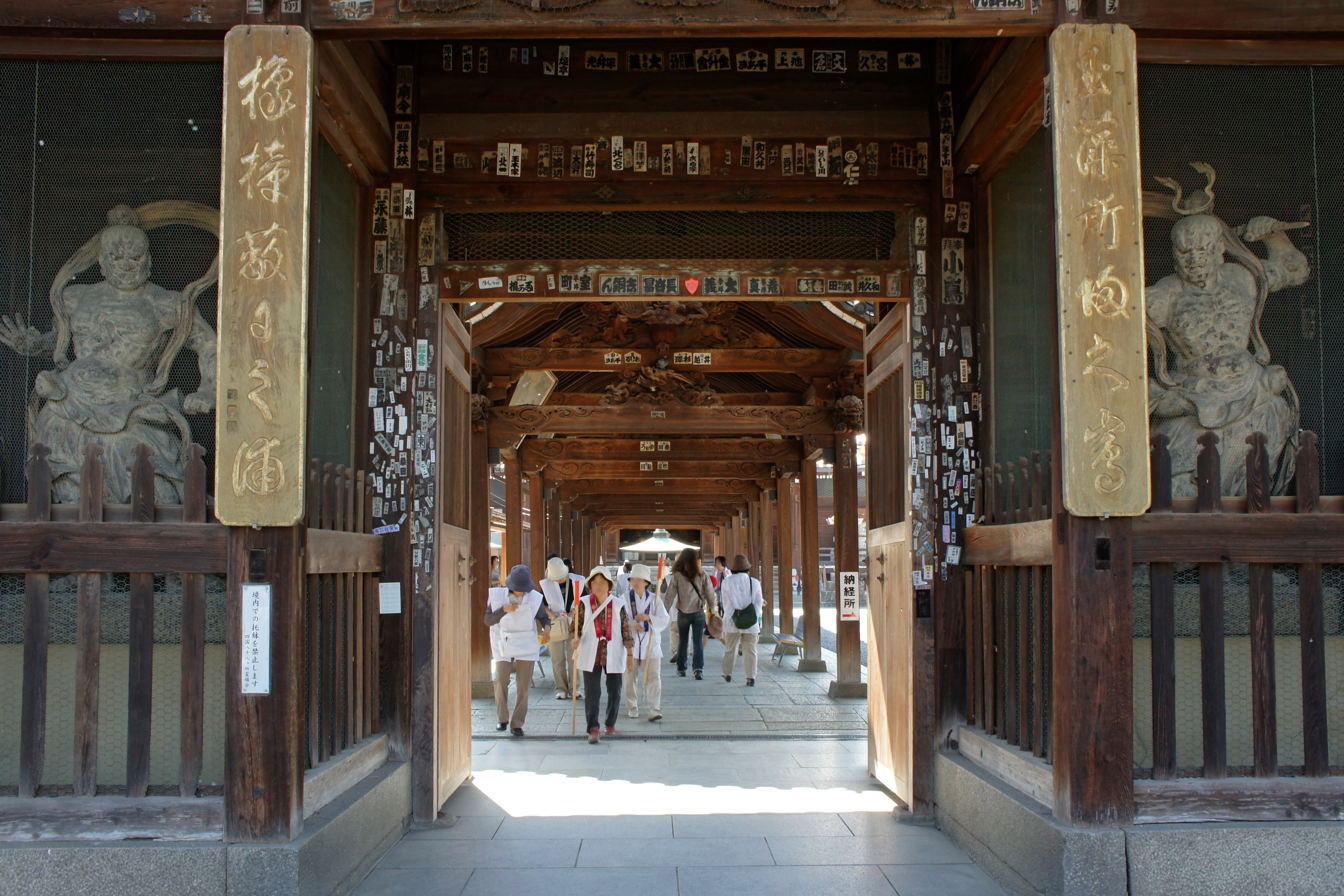
Two Niō who stand in the left (Ungyō) and the right (Agyō) of sanmon (gate) at Zentsū-ji in Japan

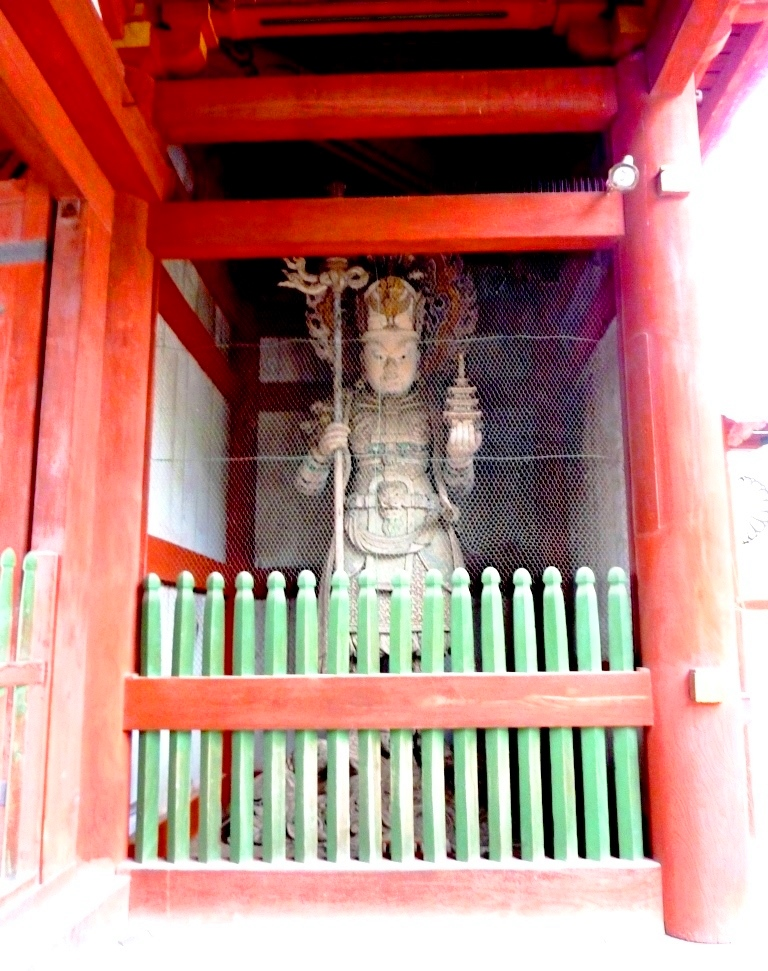
Niō or Temple Guardian. Banna-ji.

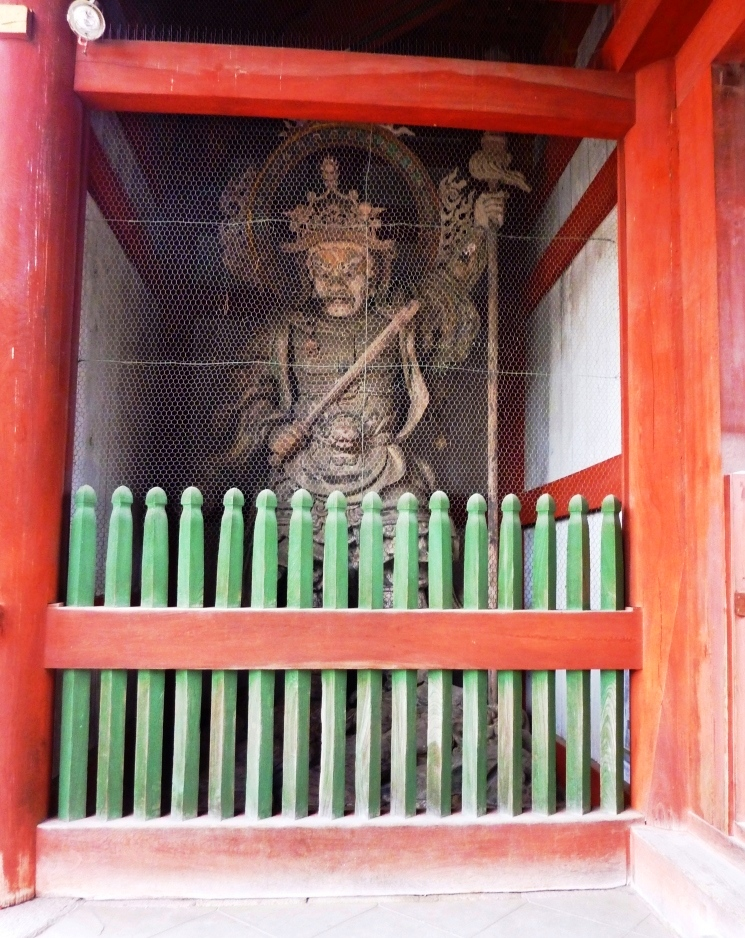
Niō - Temple Guardian. Banna-ji.

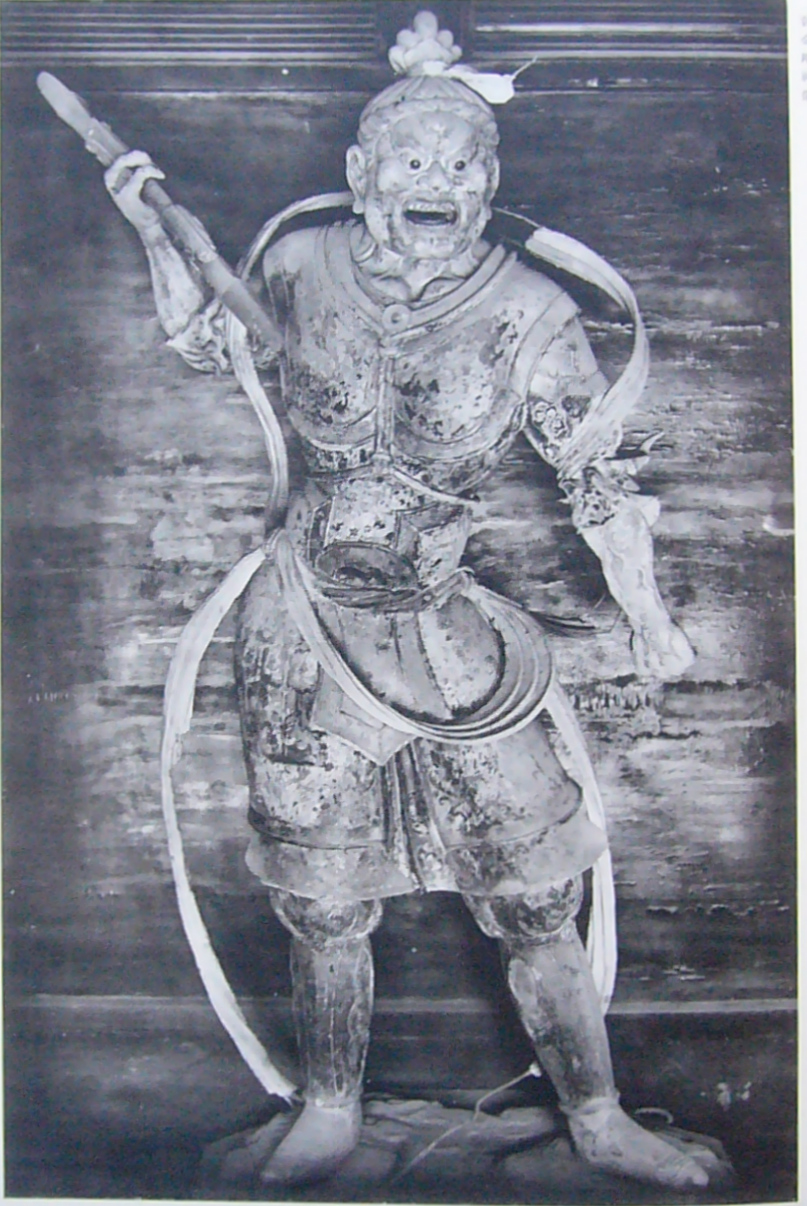
Shukongōshin in Tōdai-ji at Nara, Japan. Made in the 8th century. National Treasure of Japan.

== See also ==
- Alexiares and Anicetus, twin-sons of Heracles/Hercules and Hebe/Juventas; alongside their father, they are the guardians of the gates of Mount Olympus.
- Buddhist and Greco-Buddhist art
- Buddhist temples in Japan
- Castor and Pollux
- Door gods, for similar protective East Asian deities
- Greco-Buddhism
- Heng and Ha
- Janus
- Jaya-Vijaya
- Korean Buddhism
- List of Buddhist architecture in China
- Lugal-irra and Meslamta-ea
- Om
- Ox-Head and Horse-Face
- Vajrapani and Skanda
