= Heng and Ha =

Guardian figures at Chinese Buddhist temples

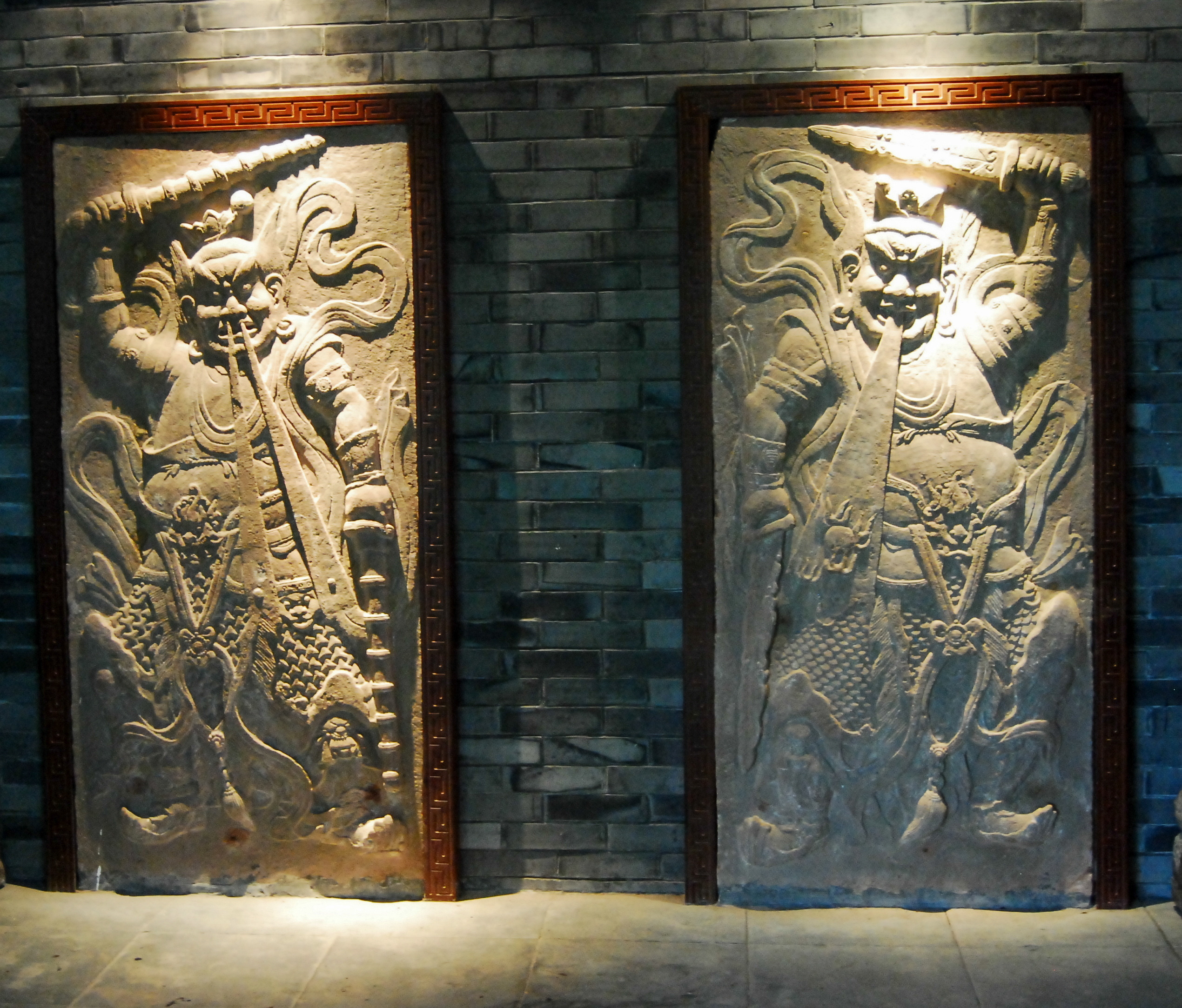
Heng and Ha at Erwang Temple, in Dujiangyan, Sichuan, China.

Heng and Ha (traditional Chinese: 哼哈二將; simplified Chinese: 哼哈二将; pinyin: Hēng-Hā èr jiàng) are the two wrathful vajra-wielding warriors who stand at the entrances of most Chinese Buddhist temples.

== Buddhism ==
In Chinese Buddhism, Heng and Ha are the common names of the jingang lishi, two guards of Buddhist temples. They are usually placed on both sides of the Shanmen. Referred to as "Narayana" (Buddha's warrior attendant) or "Yaksha Deity" (夜叉神) or "Zhi Jin Gang" (执金刚; 執金剛) in Chinese. Narayana is a Dharmapala who protects Buddhism with his Vajra in his hand. Vajras are scepters, symbolic of lightning, wielded by kings and heavenly deities in India, and it symbolizes solidness and sharpness in Buddhism.

Originally, there was only one Narayana in Buddhism, after the introduction of Buddhism from India to China it had a profound influence on Chinese traditional culture and folk customs. In order to meet Chinese custom of being in pairs, Chinese people cast two Narayana to safeguard the Shanmen of Buddhist temples. They are wearing crowns, ethereal clothes with their upper bodies exposed, with well-developed muscles and short skirts. They have widely open eyes and protruding noses, holding Vajras in their hands, and glaring the ground awesomely and angrily. The right one, has its mouth open to pronounce the sound "a", while the other has it closed to utter the sound "heng". The symbolism is the same already seen. The generic name for statues with an open mouth is Ha (哈; "a" shape), that for those with a closed mouth Heng (哼; "heng" shape). The two sounds are the start and end sounds in Sanskrit, symbolizing the basis of sounds and bearing the profound theory of Dharma. It is encountered throughout East Asia, including in Japan and Korea. In Japan, Heng and Ha are called A-un.

== Novel ==
In the Ming dynasty (1368 - 1644) shenmo novel Investiture of the Gods, the characters of Hengjiang (哼将; 'General Heng') and Hajiang (哈将; 'General Ha') are based on Heng and Ha, and their names are given as Zheng Lun (郑伦; 鄭倫) and Chen Qi (陈奇; 陳奇) respectively. In the novel, both are portrayed as officials in charge of guarding the grain during the Shang dynasty. By the end of the novel, Jiang Ziya canonized them as gods and added them to Feng Shen Bang's list (封神榜).

== Gallery ==
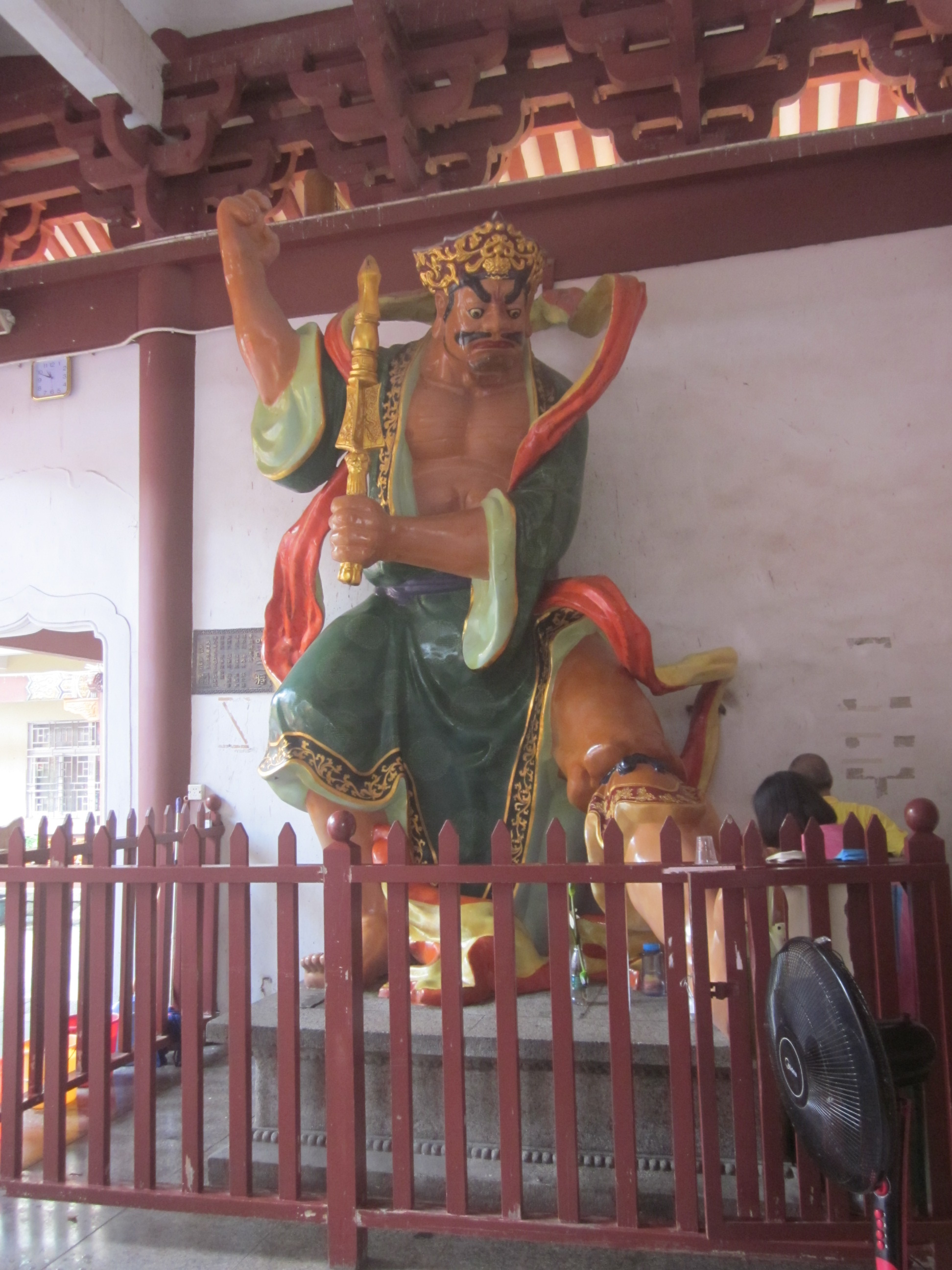
The Heng.

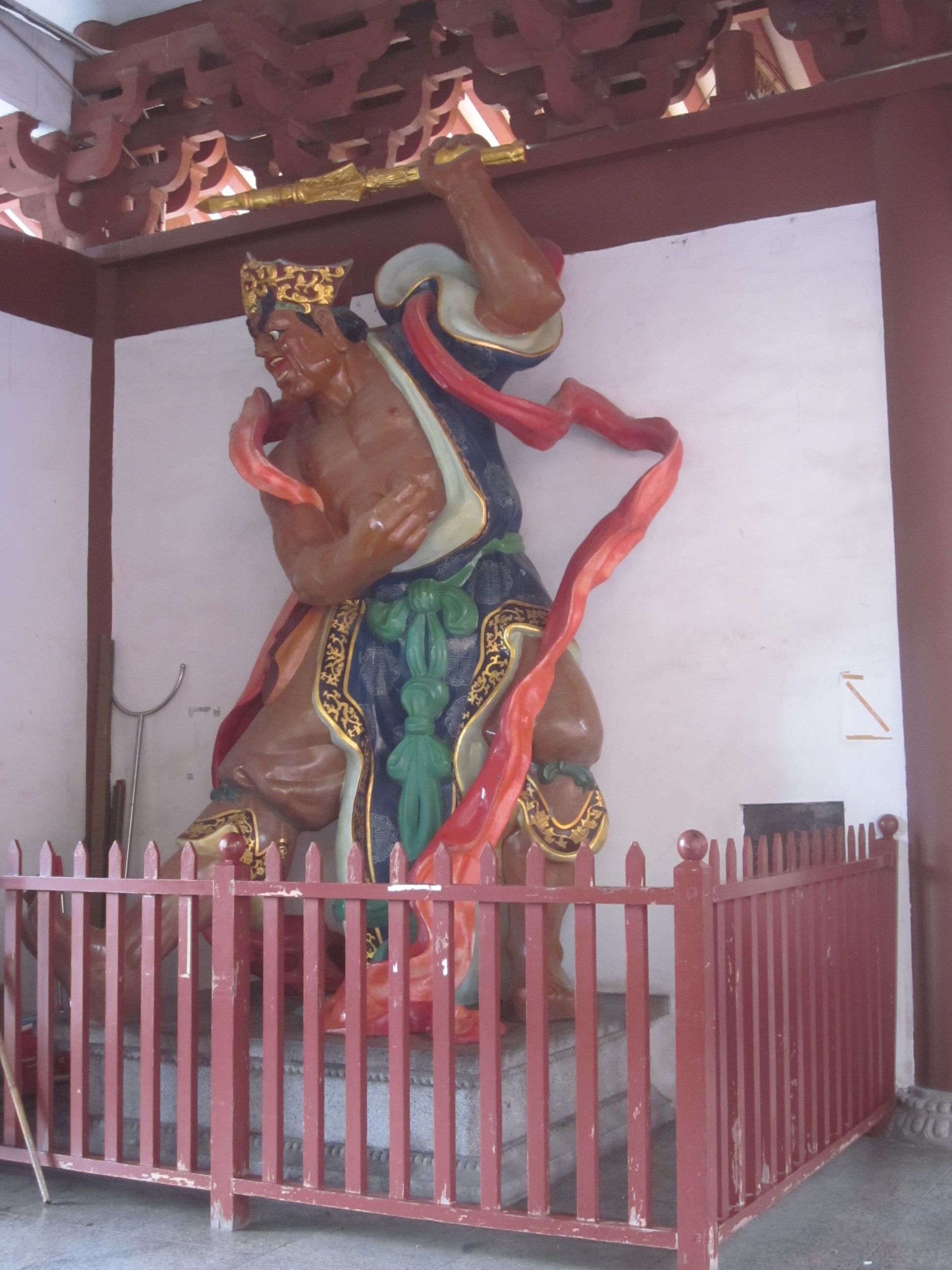
The Ha

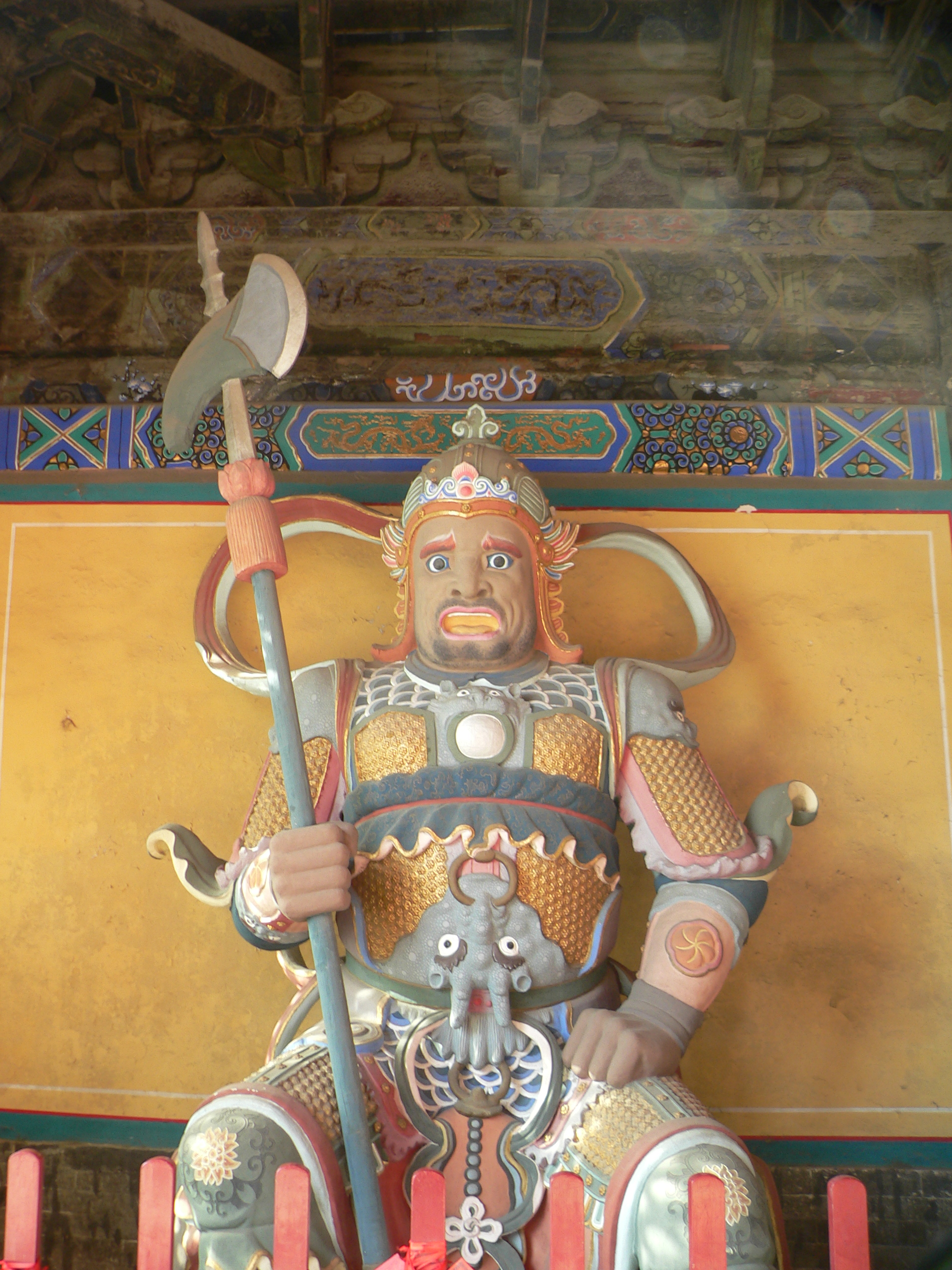
The Ha.

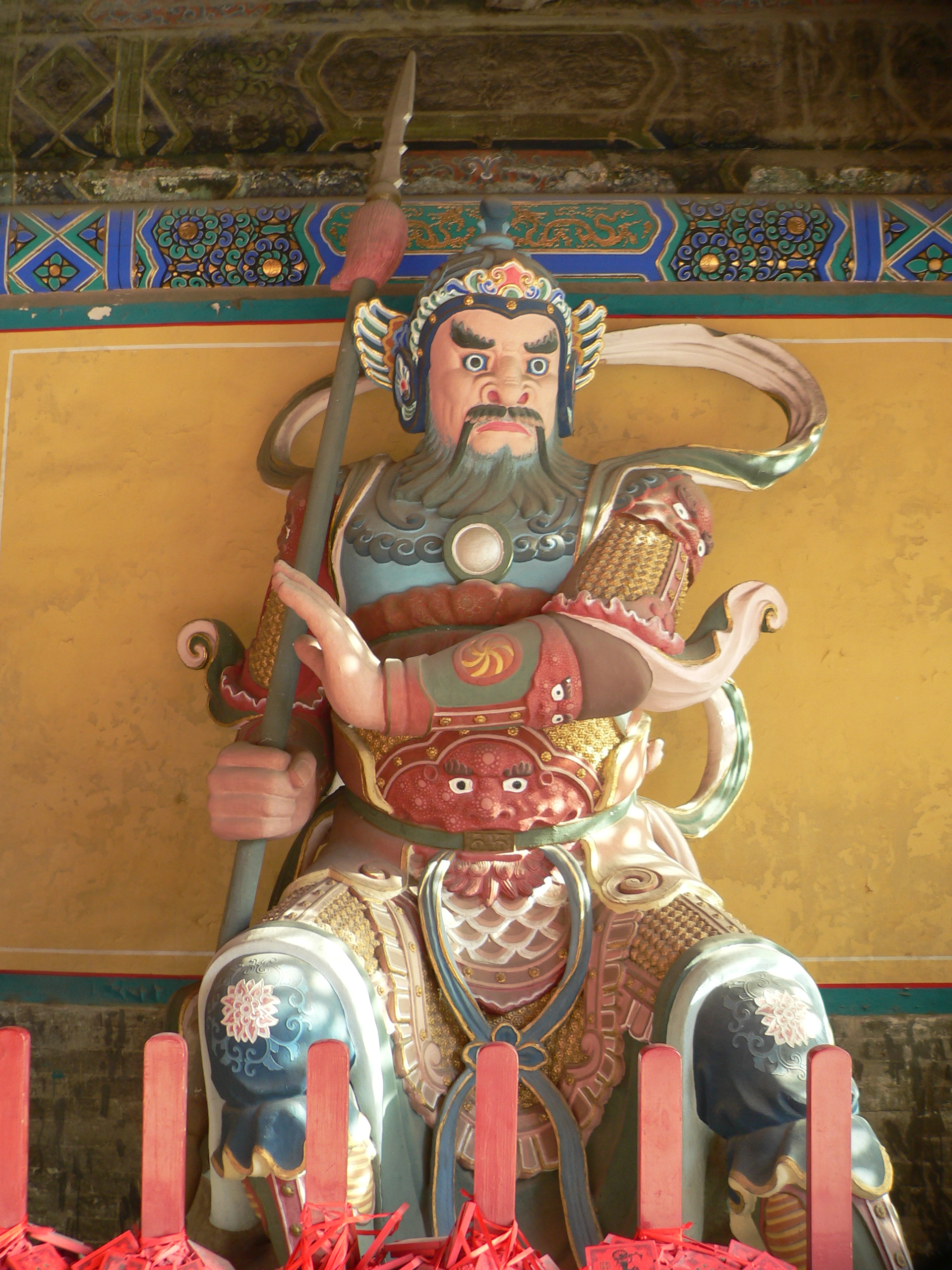
The Heng

== See also ==
- A-un
- Menshen
- Nio (Buddhism)
- Shanmen
