= Shanmen =

Important entrance gate at a Chinese Buddhist temple

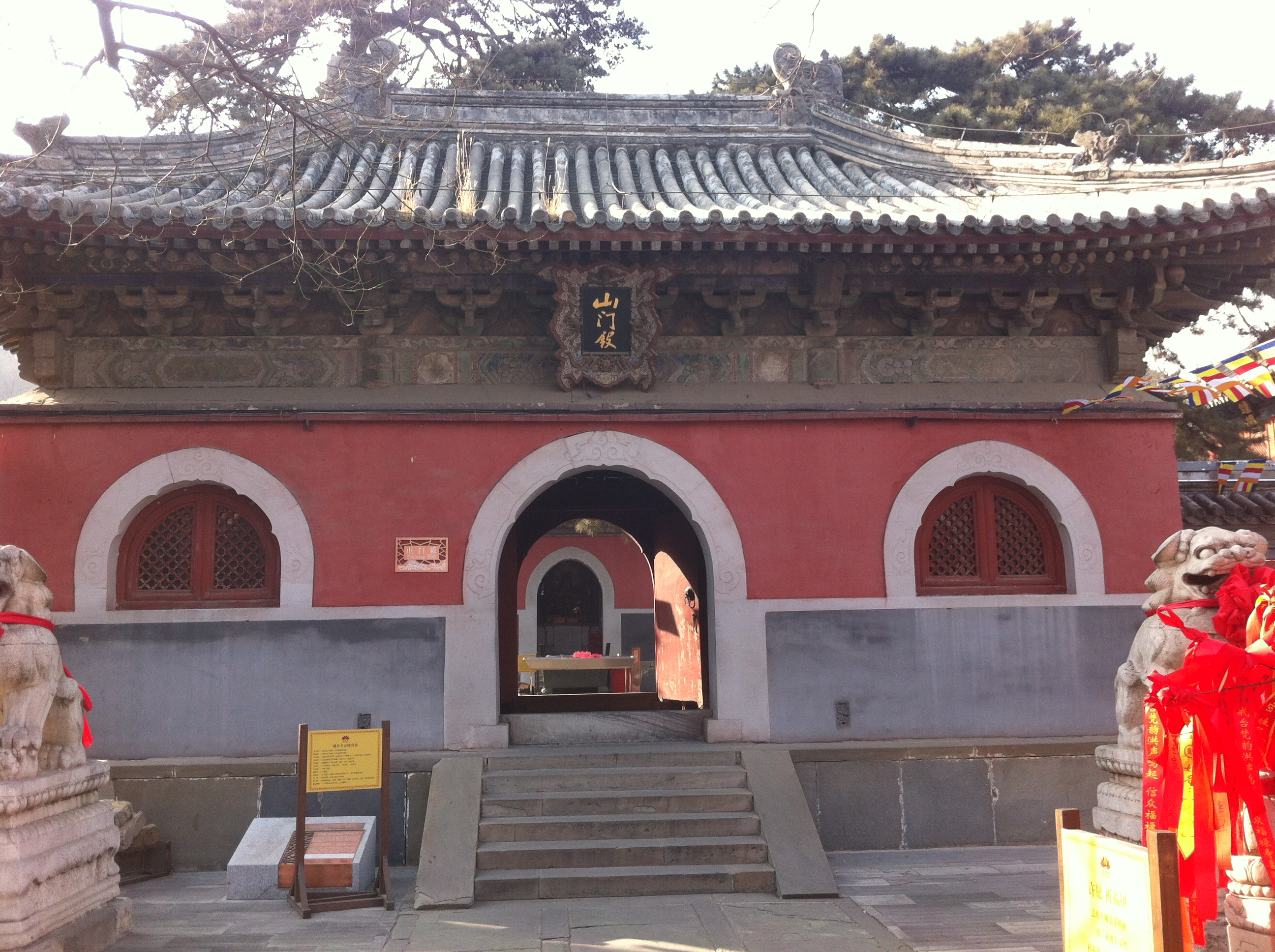
The Hall of Shanmen at Jietai Temple, in Beijing, capital of China.

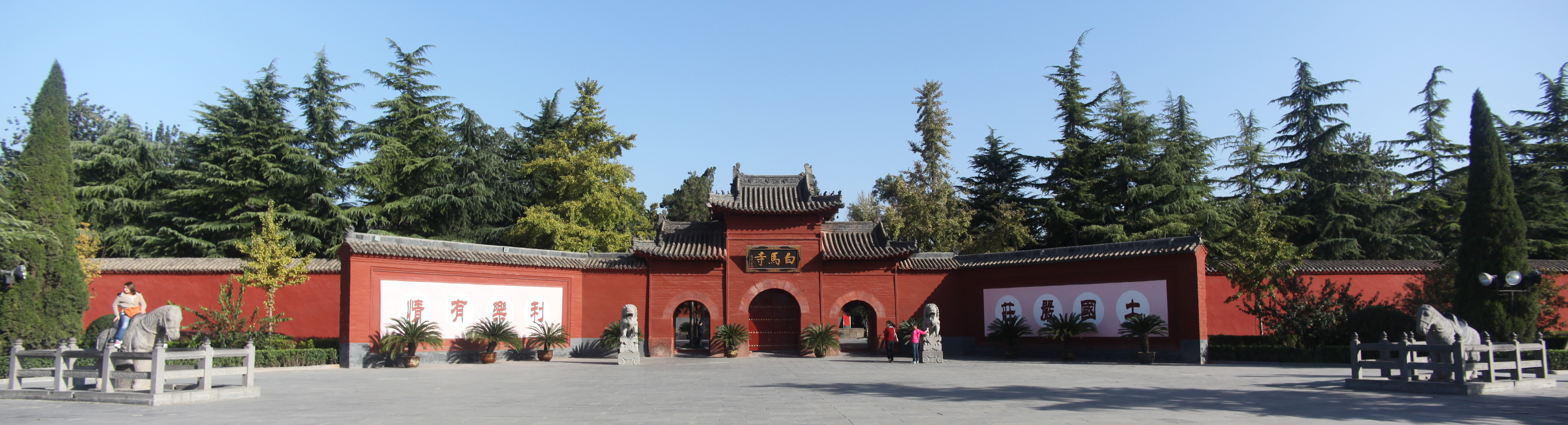
The shanmen (Gate of Three Liberations) at White Horse Temple, in Luoyang, Henan Province

The Gate of Shanmen or Hall of the Shanmen or simply Shanmen (simplified Chinese: 山门殿; traditional Chinese: 山門殿; pinyin: Shānméndiàn) (Note: also known as the Hall or Gate of Three Liberations and sometimes Hall of the Mount Gate), is the entrance gate of a Buddhist temple. In ancient times, nearly all Buddhist temples had a single Shanmen gate leading into a large hall for the temple. Today, it is observed that most of the surviving Chinese Buddhist temples follow the hall style but have three main gates incorporated into their construction. After successive wars and cultural discontinuity, most Chan Buddhist temples have changed the middle gate into a hall entrance, called the "Hall of Shanmen". The Shanmen is the most important gate of a Chan Buddhist temple.

== Etymology ==
One theory is that "Shanmen" takes its literal meaning of "Mountain Gate", because temples were traditionally built in forested mountain areas where Chan monks could seclude away from secular life. Another suggests that during various episodes of suppression of Buddhism in Chinese history, monks moved their monasteries deep into the mountains, and later built gates at the foot of the mountain to guide pilgrims to the temples. A further theory is that "Shanmen" is a corruption of "Sanmen", or "Three Gates", referring to the "three gateways" to liberations (三解脱门; 三解脫門; sān jiětuō mén) in the Dharma – the emptiness liberation (空门; 空門; kōngmén), no-aspects liberation (无相门; 無相門; wúxiàngmén) and desireless liberation (无愿门; 無願門; wúyuànmén). This latter view correlates with the traditional structure of Chan temples which included three gateways, said to symbolise the three gateways.

== Architectural styles ==
Historic Shanmens in China are either a gateway of the paifang style, or a more substantial building, typically with three archways. When a more substantial temple building is built, the two side gateways might be simplified to arched or circular windows, leaving only the middle gate for access. The gate building may be called the "Hall of Three Liberations" or "Hall of the Mountain Gate".

Traditionally, if the Shanmen takes the form of a gate building, the statues of two figures from Buddhist lore are erected in that hall to guard the entrance, identified as "Heng and Ha" or the "A-un" Nio in Japanese. Such is the arrangement at the Jietai Temple in Beijing.

In some Chan temples, the Shanmen building is combined with the Hall of the Four Heavenly Kings, so that the Four Heavenly Kings serve as guardians of the gateway to the monastery. In other Chan temples, the Shanmen building is combined with the Maitreya Hall, with a statue of the Maitreya Buddha erected in the centre of the hall. This is the arrangement seen at Shaolin and Longhua temples. Some Chan temples combine both the Maitreya Hall and the Hall of the Four Heavenly Kings with the Shanmen, so that the entrance building also features the statue of the Maitreya Buddha at the centre, as well as the Four Heavenly Kings on the sides. Such an arrangement is found at the Lingyin Temple, in Hangzhou, Zhejiang Province, China.

=== Guardian statues ===
In niches positioned right and left of a Shanmen Hall, there will be enshrined a statue of a heavenly deity with a vajra in his hand. These deities are called the Benevolent King or Kings (仁王), Rénwáng in Chinese and Niō in Japanese. They may also be known as the "Yaksha Deity" (夜叉神; yèchā shén) or "Vajrapani" (执金刚; 執金剛; zhíjīn'gāng). The vajra was originally the short metal weapon of Indra, the king of the gods in early Hindu mythology. It symbolises solid unity and sharpness in Buddhism. Nio is a Dharmapala who protects Buddhism with the ever present vajra in his hand.

Originally, there was one Benevolent King incorporated into a temple. During the transmission of Buddhism into China under the Eastern Han Dynasty (1st–3rd century), however, Chinese Buddhism used two statues instead in accordance with the prevailing use of pairs of door gods and more general tendency to conceive of deities in pairs. The Benevolent King(s) wear crowns, loose clothes exposing the well-developed muscles of their upper bodies, and knee-length skirts and have wide-open eyes and protruding noses. They hold weapons in their hands and angrily glare at the ground, projecting an awesome persona. The statue on the right typically has its mouth open to pronounce the sound "a", while the one on the left has its mouth closed in order to utter the sound "hong", the Chinese equivalent of the Sanskrit om and together representing the totality of life. The generic name for those statues with an open mouth is General Ha (哈将军; 哈將軍; hā jiāngjūn; Japanese: 阿吽), and for those with a closed mouth, General Heng (哼将军; 哼將軍; hēng jiāngjūn; Japanese: 阿形).

== Gallery ==
Hover over pictures to view captions

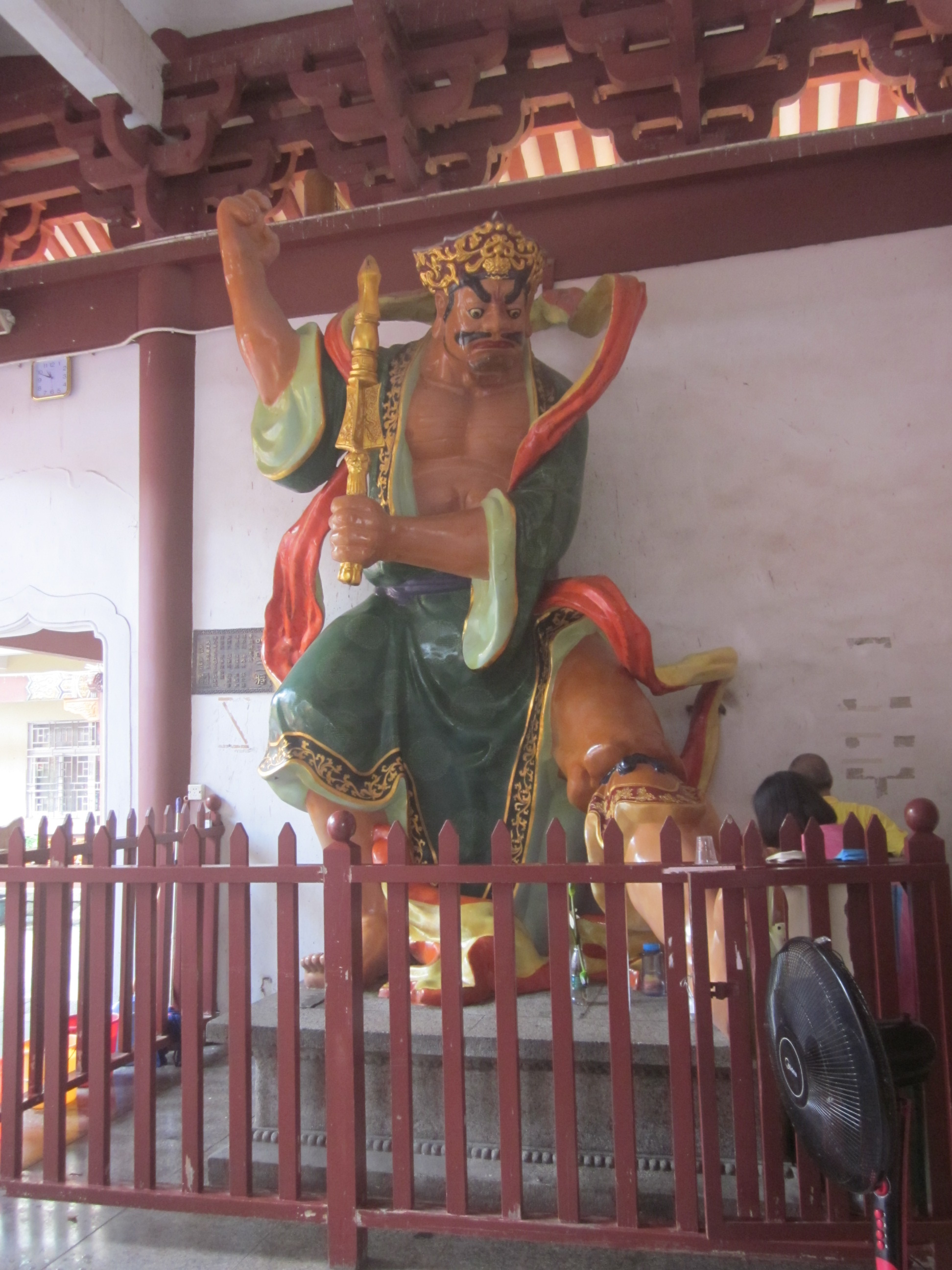
General Heng (哼將軍) inside the Shanmen Hall of the Hongfa Temple, Shenzhen, Guangdong, China

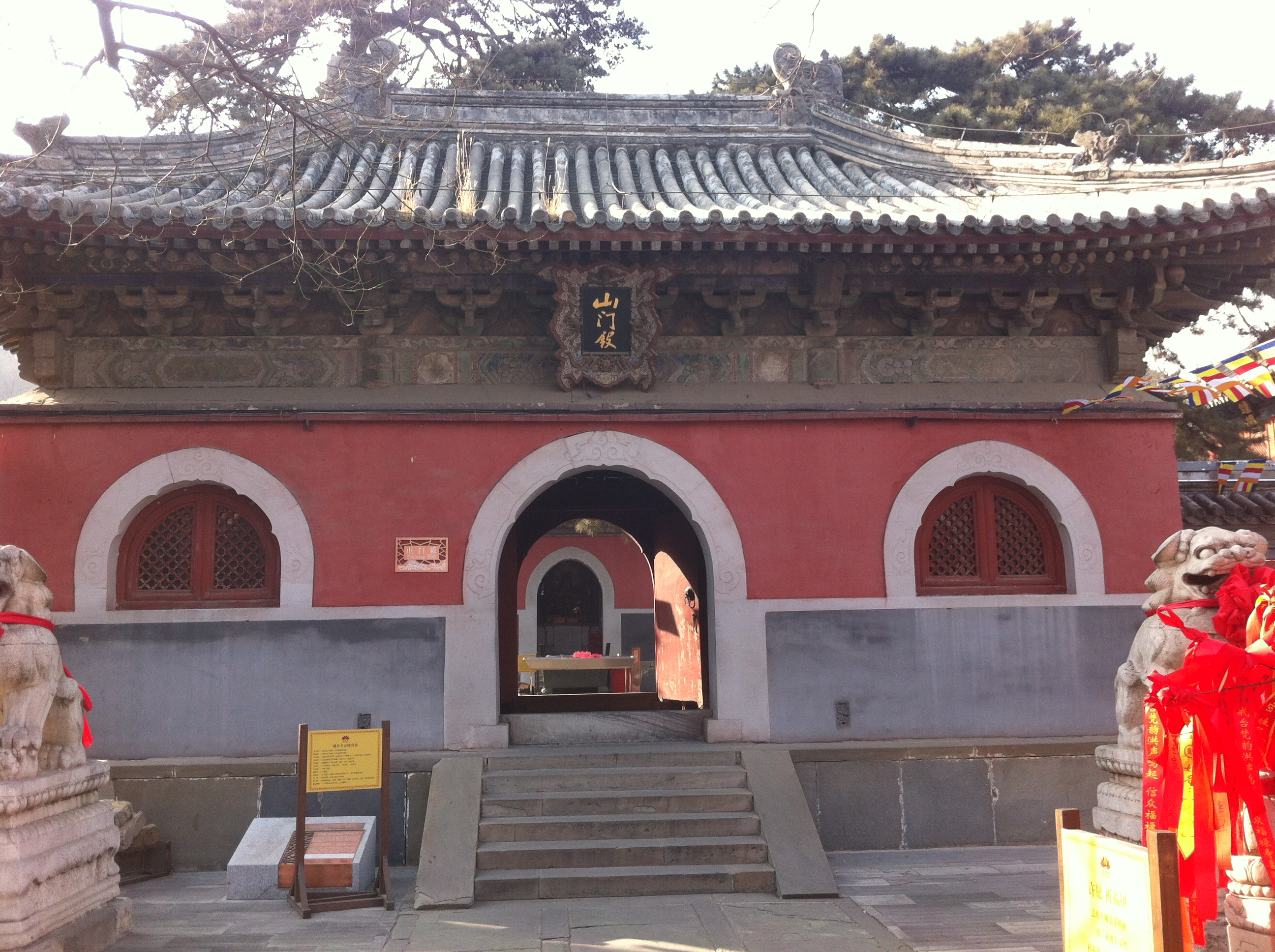
The Hall of Mount Gate at the Jietai Temple, Beijing. The arched windows represent the traditional side gateways.

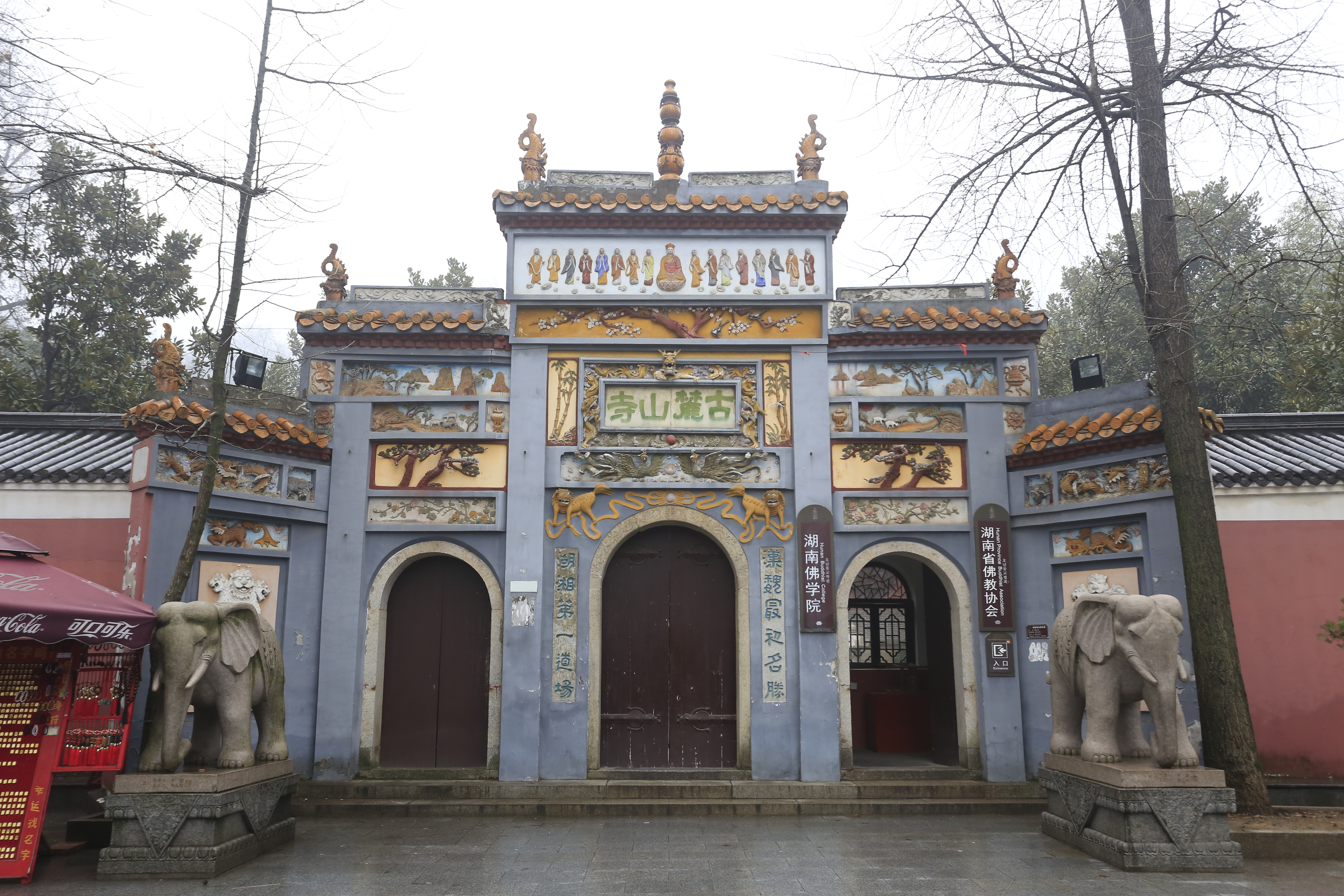
The shanmen at the Lushan Temple, in the Yuelu District, of Changsha City, Hunan province.

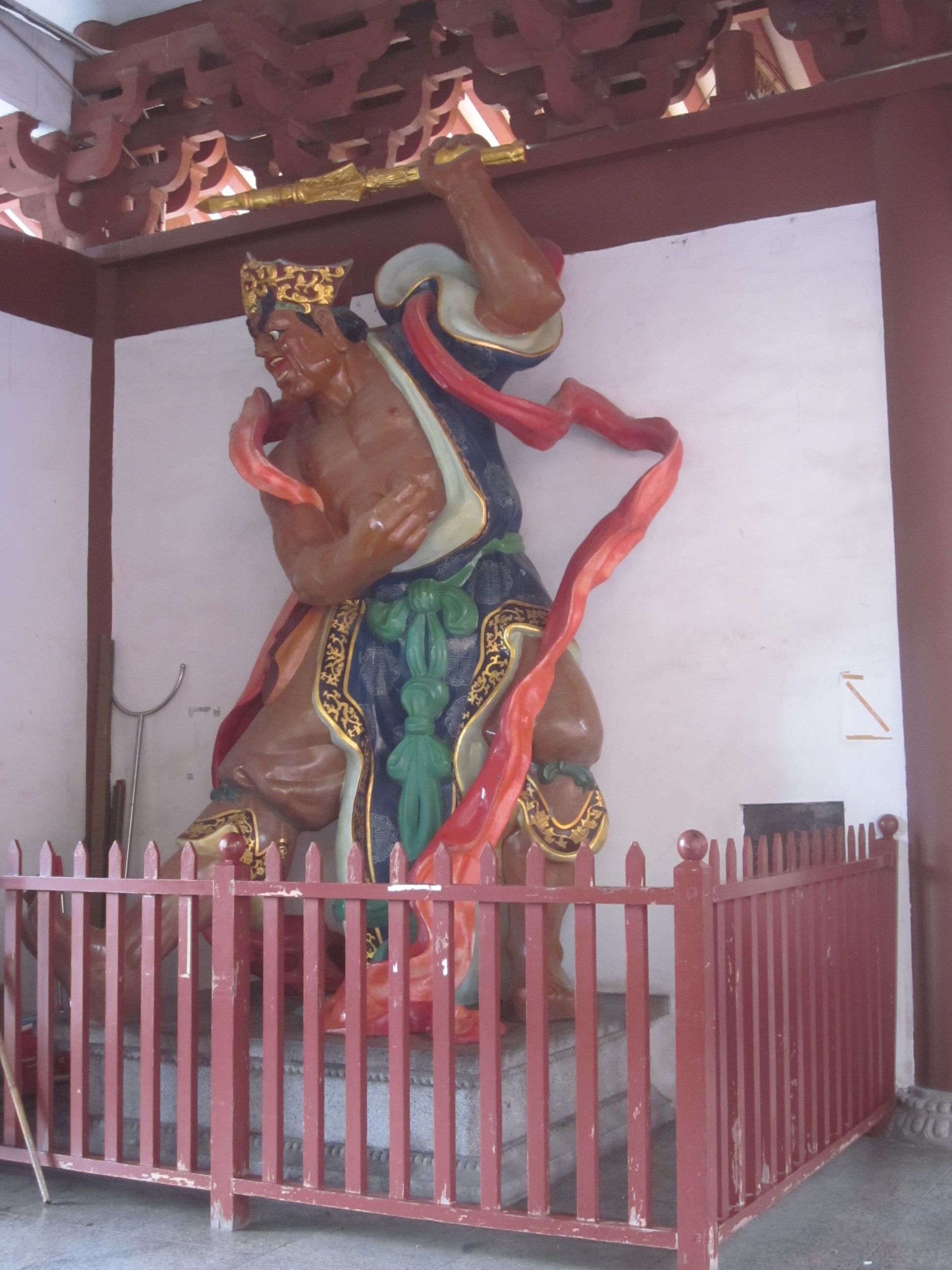
General Ha guarding the Shanmen Hall inside the Hongfa Temple, Shenzhen, Guangdong, China

== See also ==
- Sanmon
- In Korean Buddhist temples, iljumun, sacheonwangmun, and burimun are sometimes referred to as sanmun.
