= Protect the Country Temple =

Chinese name
- Traditional Chinese: 護國寺
- Simplified Chinese: 护国寺
Transcriptions
Standard Mandarin
- Hanyu Pinyin: Hùguó Sì
- Wade–Giles: Hu-kuo ssu

Japanese name
- Shinjitai: 護国寺
Transcriptions
- Romanization: Gokoku ji

Protect the Country Temple may refer to these Buddhist temples:

- Huguo Temple (Beijing), in Beijing, China
- Huguo Temple (Panzhou), in Panzhou, Guizhou, China
- Huguo Temple (Wenzhou), in Wenzhou, Zhejiang, China
- Linji Huguo Chan Temple, in Taipei, Taiwan
- Gokoku-ji, in Tokyo, Japan
- Gokoku-ji (Okinawa), in Naha, Okinawa, Japan

== See also ==
- Huguo (disambiguation)
- Gokoku Shrine
