= Hongguo =

Hongguo may refer to:

- Hongguo (brand), a Chinese microdrama streaming platform
- Hongguo Subdistrict, Panzhou, Guizhou, China
- Hongguo (Chinese: 红果), a name for Crataegus pinnatifida
