= Huguo Temple (Panzhou) =

Buddhist temple in Guizhou, China

- 护国寺
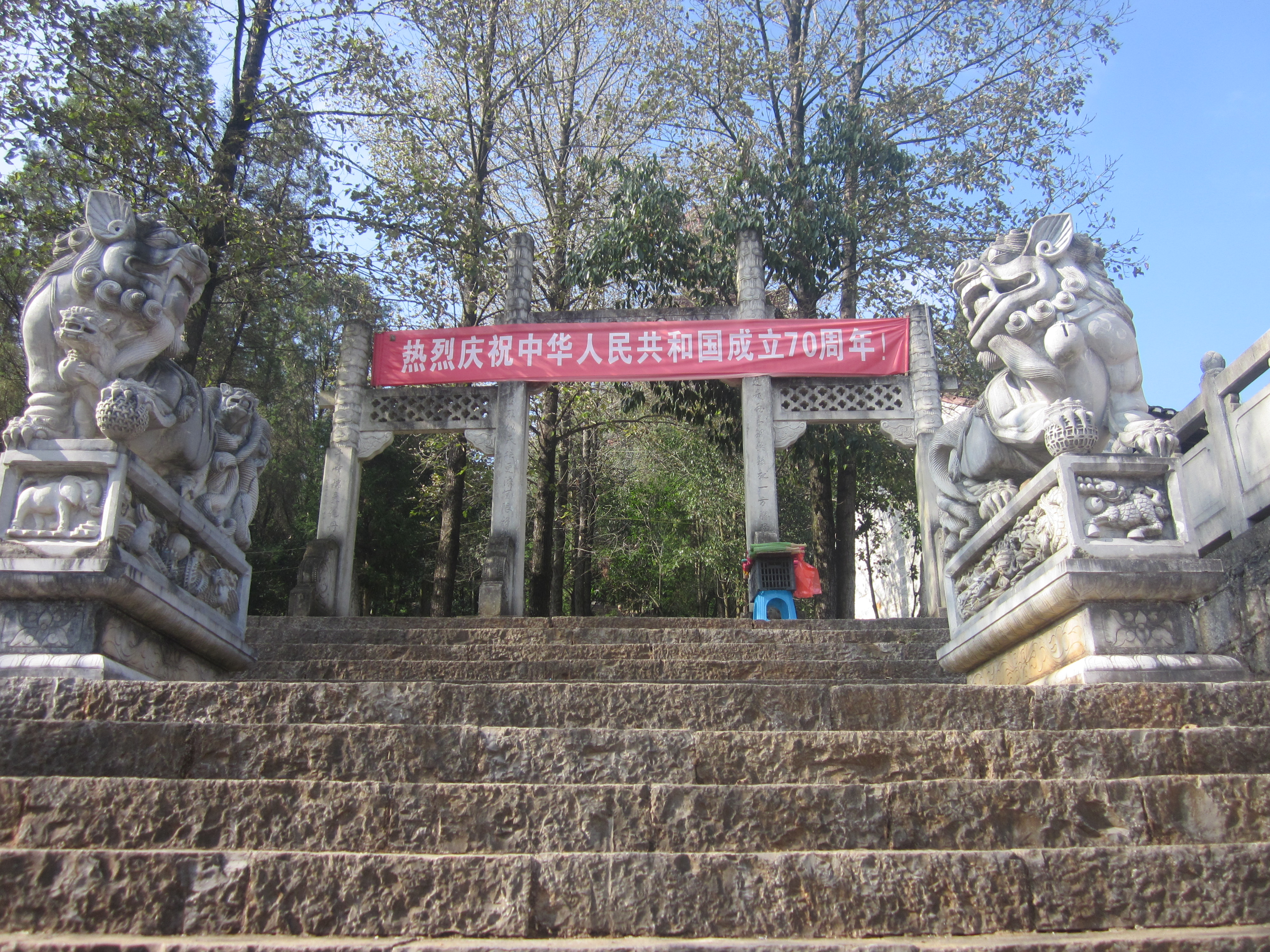
- A paifang and Chinese guardian lions in front of Huguo Temple.

- Location within Guizhou Location within China

Religion
- Affiliation: Buddhism
- Sect: Chan Buddhism

Location
- Location: Danxia, Panzhou, Guizhou, China
- Interactive map of Huguo Temple
- Coordinates: 25°40′35″N 104°38′02″E

Architecture
- Style: Chinese architecture

Huguo Temple (simplified Chinese: 护国寺; traditional Chinese: 護國寺; pinyin: Hùguó Sì; lit. 'Protect the Country Temple') is a Buddhist temple located on the top of Mount Danxia, in the town of Danxia, Panzhou, Guizhou, China.

== History ==
It is said that the temple was originally built in 1451, in the 2nd year of Jingtai period of the Ming dynasty (1368–1644). And another saying that the temple was first built in the ruling of Wanli Emperor of the Ming dynasty, between 1573 and 1620. The oldest temple was a Taoist temple known as "Xuandi Palace" (玄帝宫) and was completely destroyed by war in 1620. Four years later, monk Shi Bumei (释不昧), a former general, came to the Mount Danxia to build two temples, namely Yuanzhen Palace (元真观) and Danxia Temple (丹霞寺). One was a Taoist temple, the other was a Buddhist temple. In 1638, travel writer and geographer Xu Xiake explored the region. In his travelogue book Xu Xiake's Travels, Mount Danxia was described as pillar of heaven (形如天柱).

In 1781, during the reign of Qianlong Emperor of the Qing dynasty (1644–1911), Chan master Shi Changyi (释常怡) settled at the temple and promulgated Buddhist doctrines. In 1904, Shi Guangyi (释光一) resided in the temple and disseminated Buddhism. Two years later, Shi Shengrong (释圣融) went to Beijing to celebrate Empress Dowager Cixi's birthday, and was granted the sutra, kasaya, jade seal and golden bowl. He renamed the temple "Huguo Temple" (Protect the Country Temple) after returning.

In 1926, Shi Liaofan (释了凡) began to build a tower named "Sun Watching" (观日楼) on the pool of the central hall, which was five stories high and hung with a plaque of Chinese characters "Beautiful Scenery in Southern Sky" (南天胜景). It was completed in the following year. In 1940, Shi Xiuyuan (释修园) invited sixty-five eminent monks, including Xu Yun and Shi Yinguang, to hold a Buddhist ritual to surpass the soldiers who died in the Second Sino-Japanese War.

In 1964, many text documents were burned to ashes in the fire after the temple caught fire.

== Architecture ==
Huguo Temple is built along the up and down of Mount Danxia, now the existing main buildings include Shanmen, Hall of Maitreya, Mahavira Hall, Great Compassion Pavilion (大悲阁), Jade Buddha Hall, Guanyin Hall, Sun Watching Tower, and dining room. Plaques of Chinese characters "Mount Danxia", "Huguo Temple" and "Mahavira Hall" was written by former Venerable Master of the Buddhist Association of China Zhao Puchu.

== National treasure ==
- Two volumes of palm-leaf manuscript

== Gallery ==
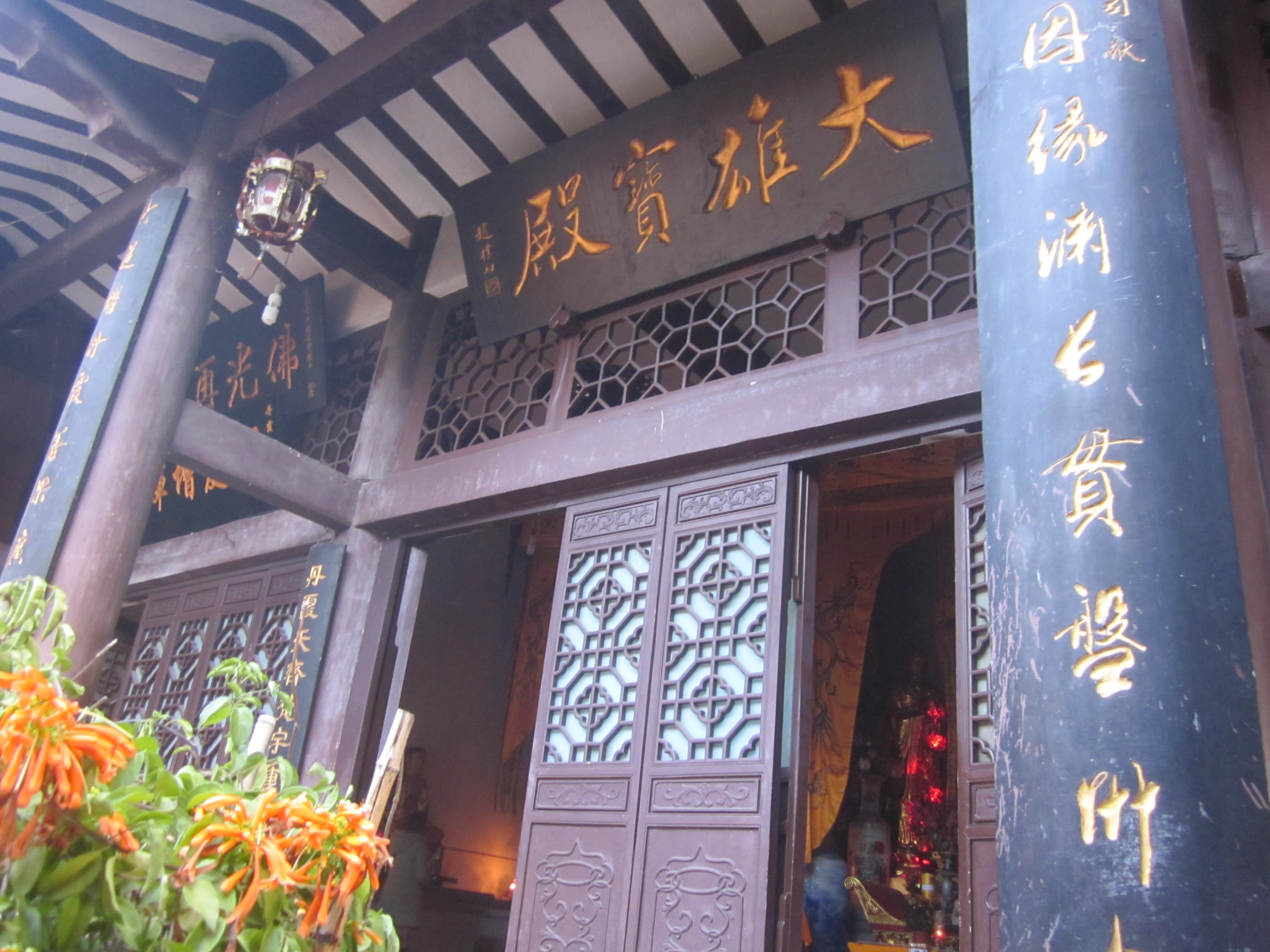
Mahavira Hall

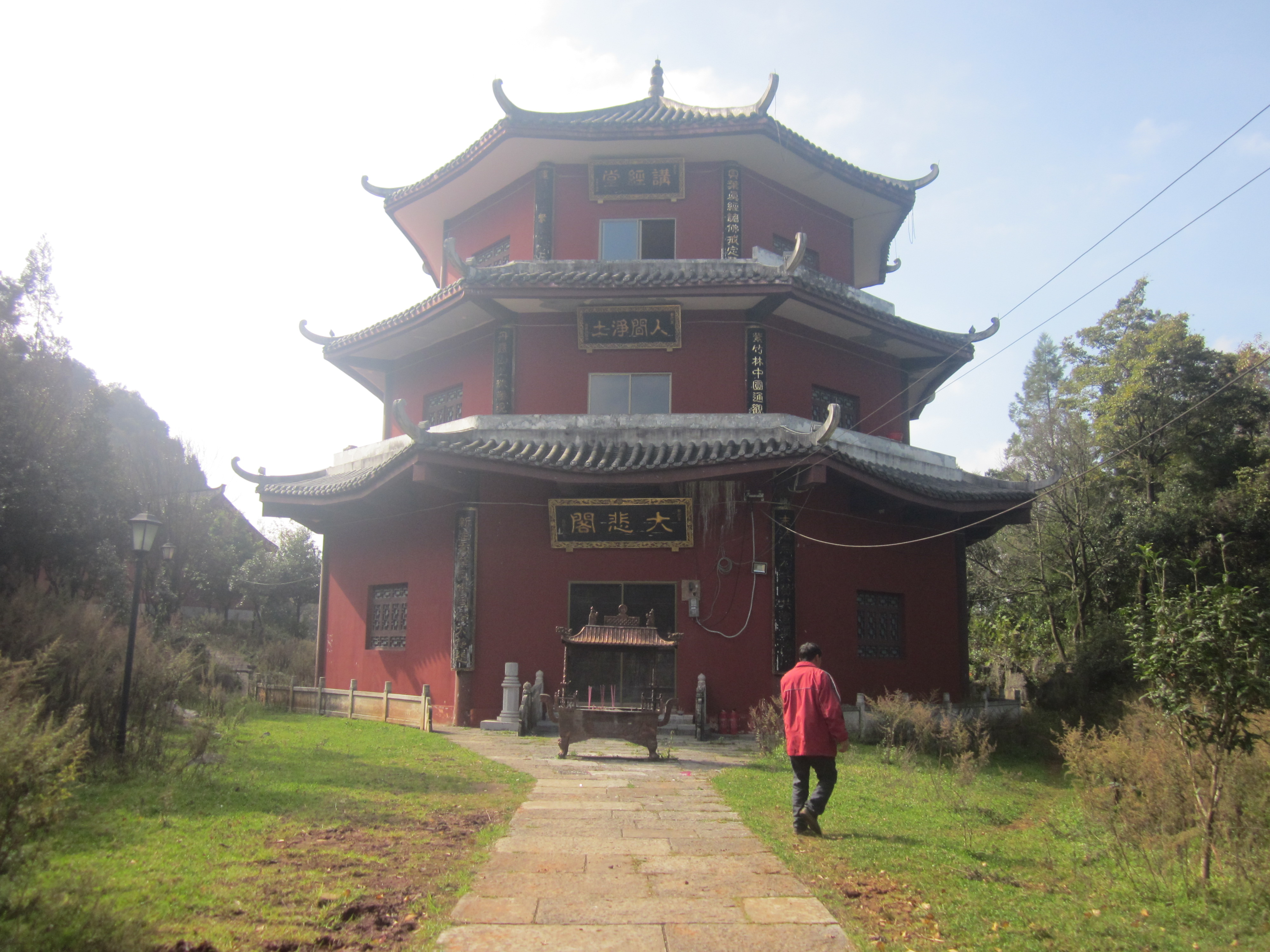
Great Compassion Pavilion

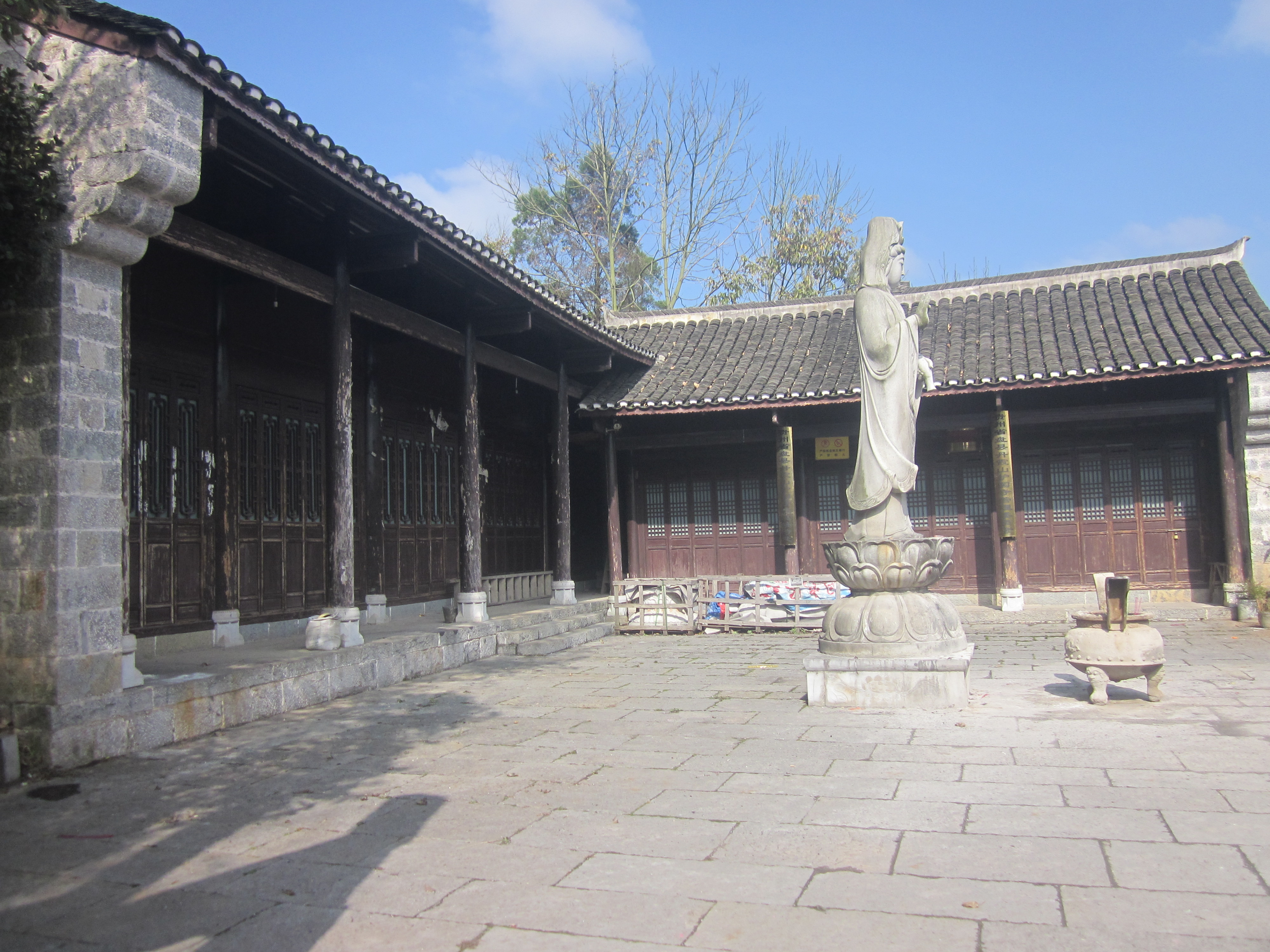
Statue of Guanyin

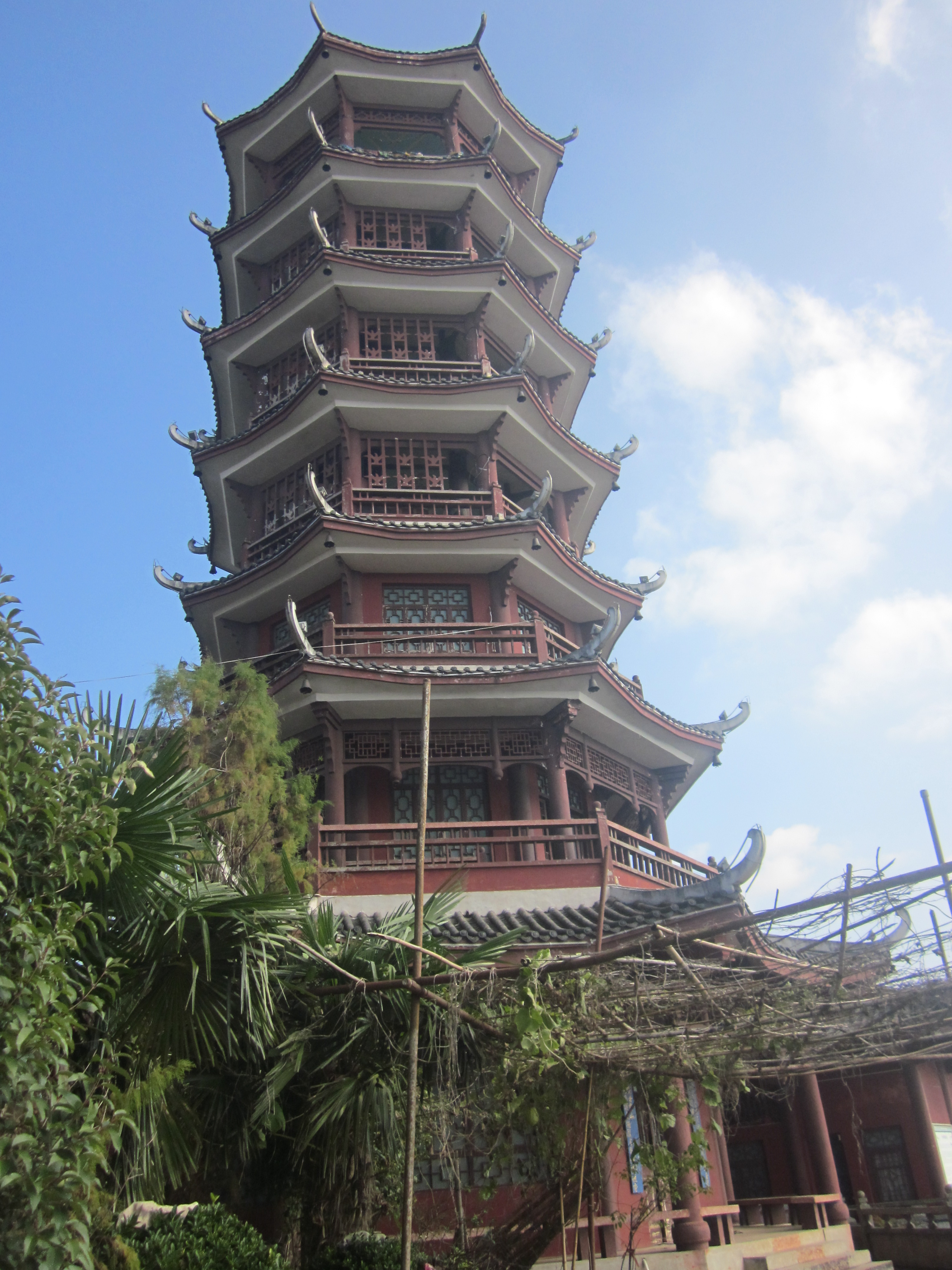
Sun Watching Tower

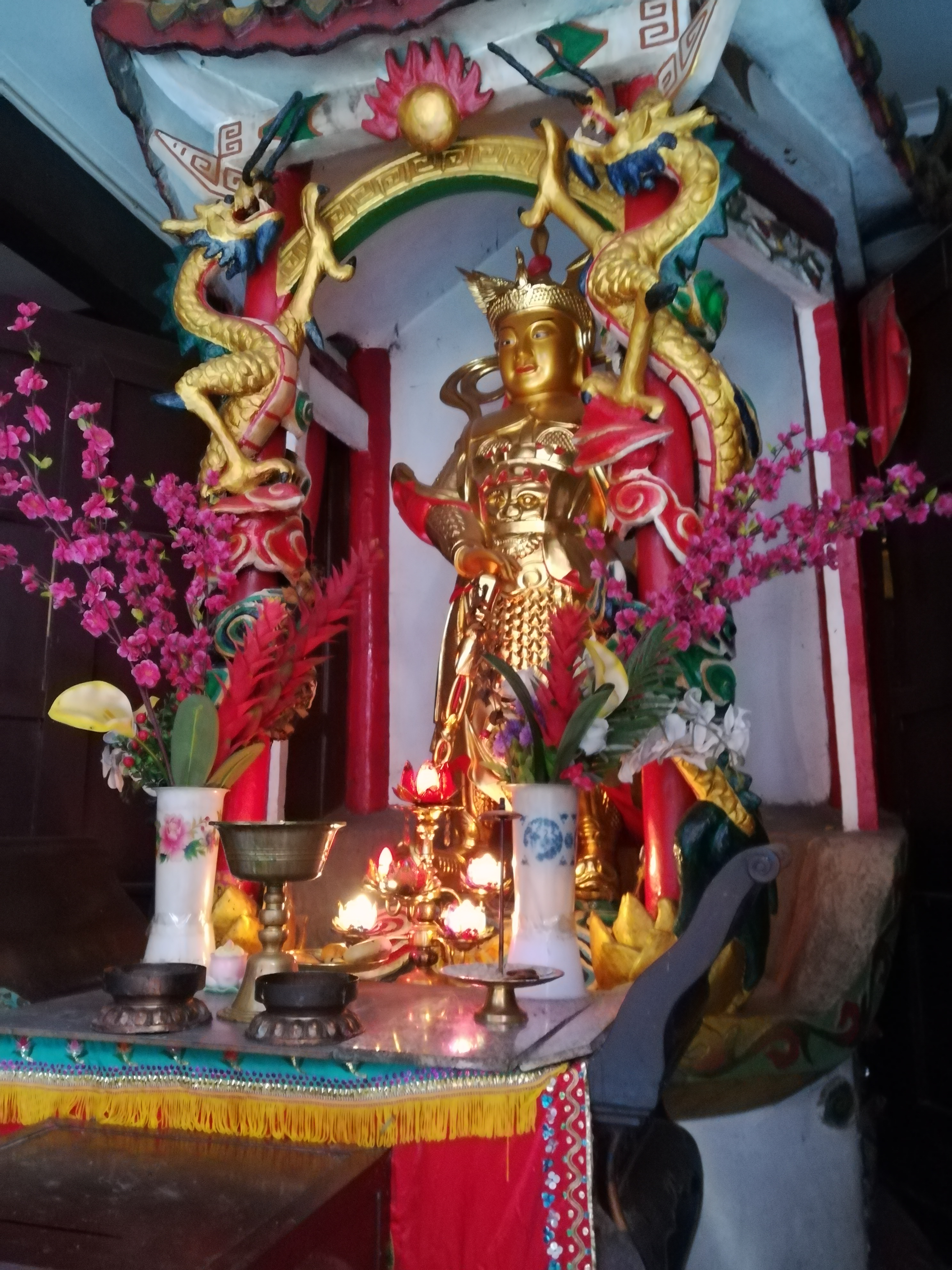
Statue of Skanda.

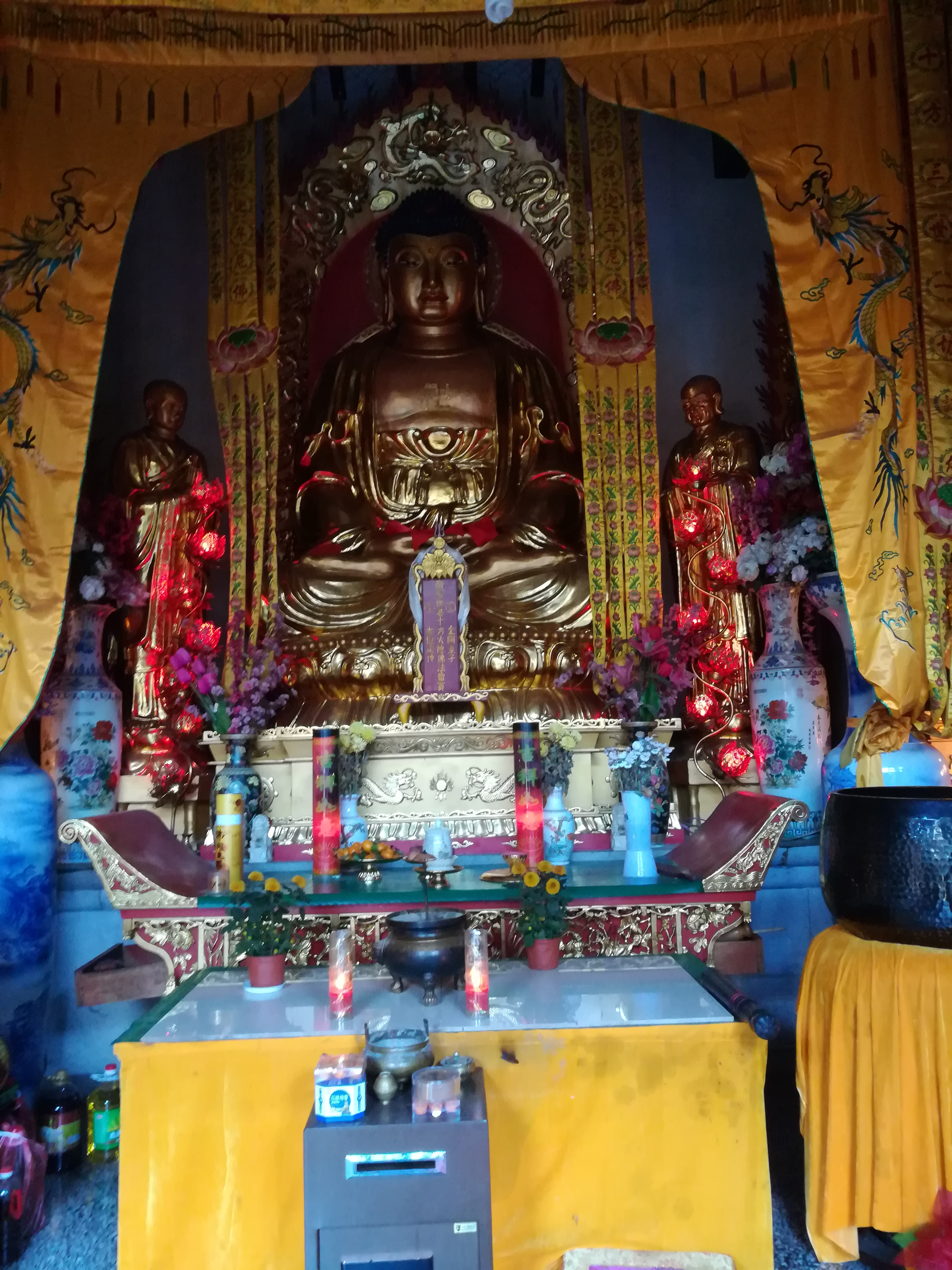
Statue of Buddha in Mahavira Hall.
