= Yizi Subdistrict =

Yizi Subdistrict 亦资街道
- Subdistrict
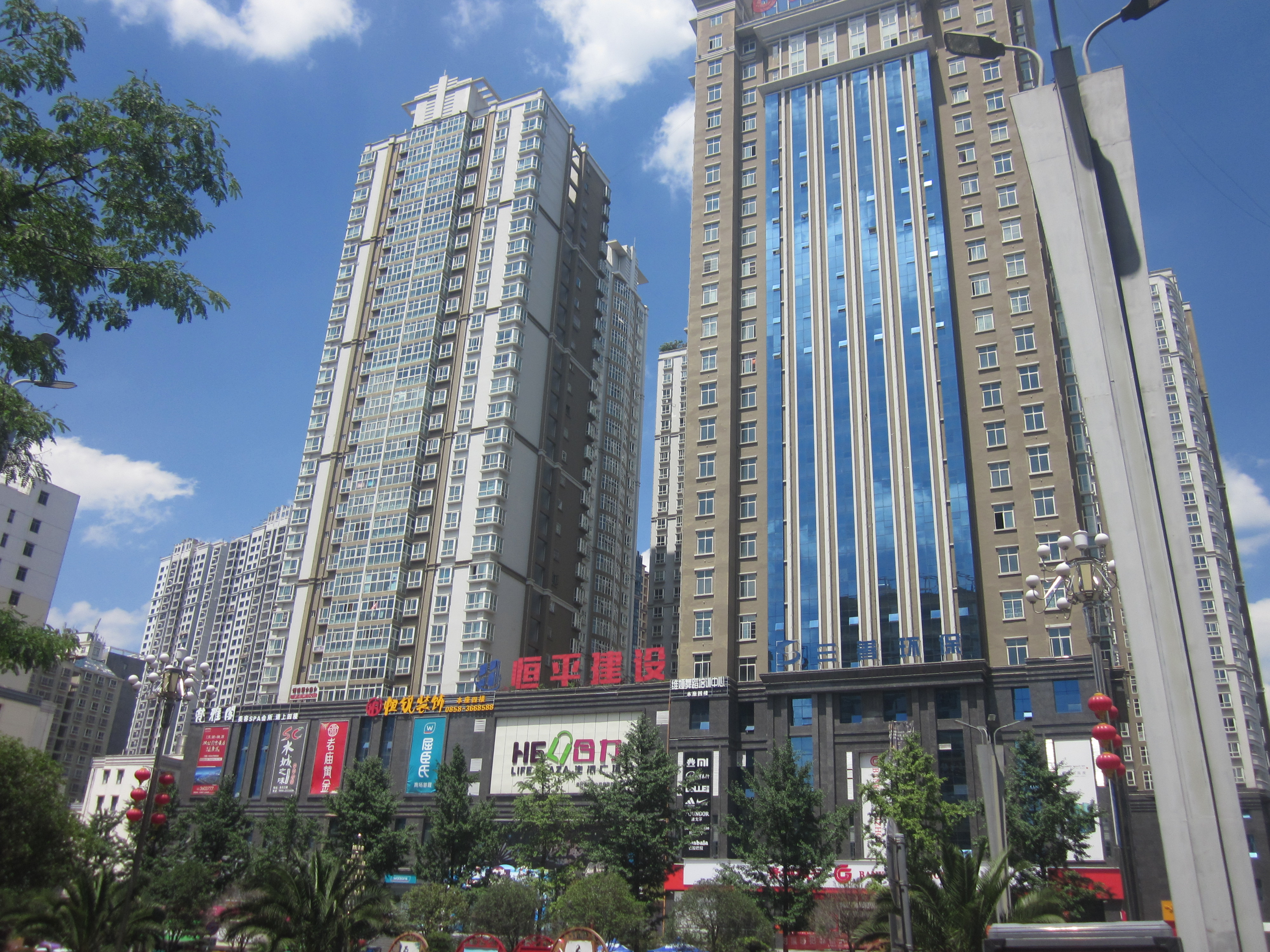
- Guizhou Bank Building and Heli Supermarket in Yizi Subdistrict.
- Interactive map of Yizi Subdistrict
- Coordinates: 25°40′48″N 104°27′22″E
- Country: People's Republic of China
- Province: Guizhou
- Prefecture-level city: Liupanshui
- County-level city: Panzhou

Area
  - Total: 68 km^{2} (26 sq mi)

Population (2015)
  - Total: 16,000
  - Density: 240/km^{2} (610/sq mi)
- Time zone: UTC+08:00 (China Standard)
- Postal code: 561601
- Area code: 0858

Chinese name
- Traditional Chinese: 亦資街道
- Simplified Chinese: 亦资街道
Transcriptions
Standard Mandarin
- Hanyu Pinyin: Yìzī Jiēdào

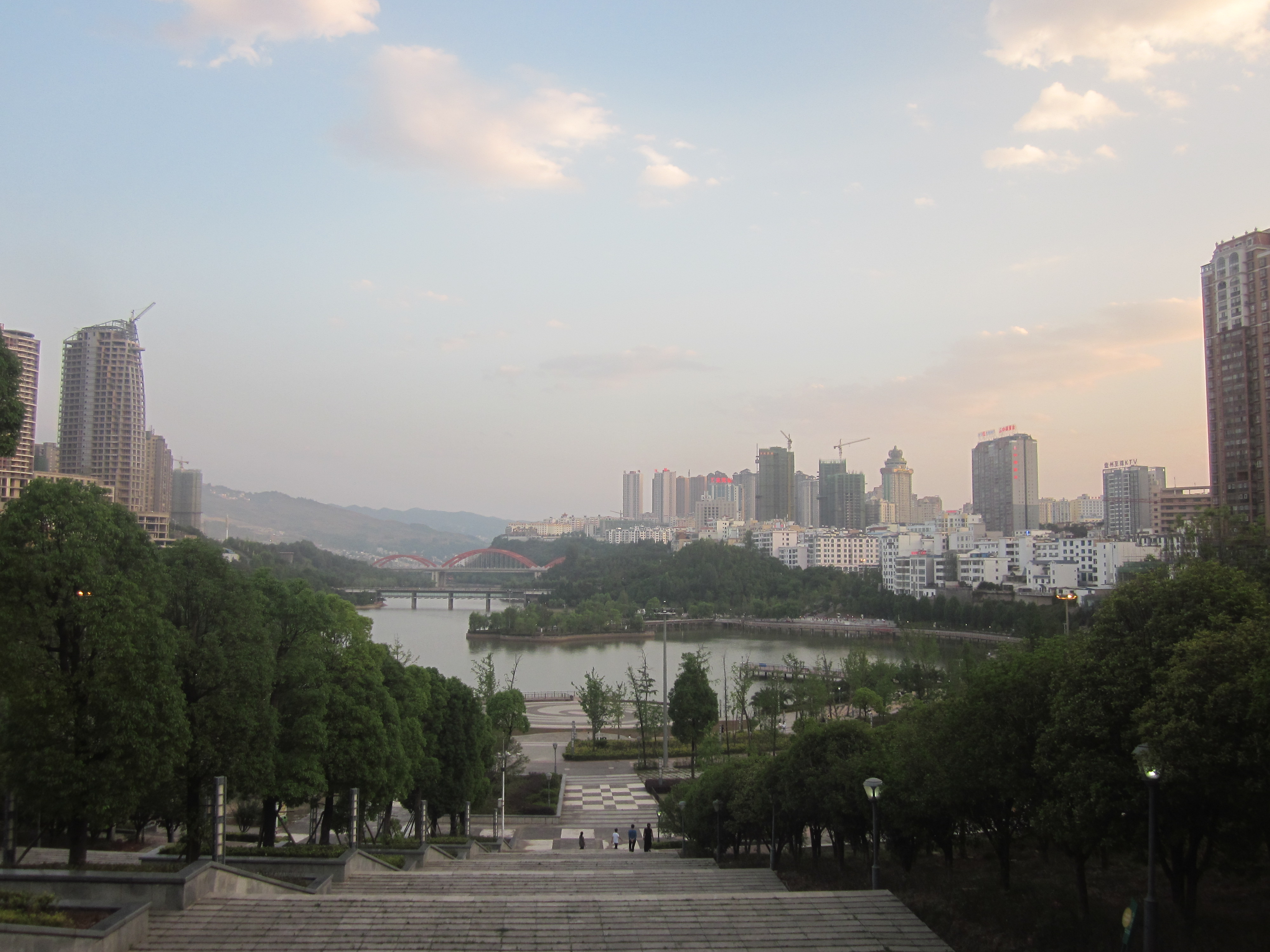
A commanding view of the East Lake Park.

Yizi Subdistrict (Chinese: 亦资街道) is a subdistrict in Panzhou, Guizhou, China. As of the 2015 census it had a population of 16,000 and an area of 68-square-kilometre (26 sq mi).

== History ==
On July 2, 2013, Hongguo Town was divided into two subdistricts: Hongguo Subdistrict and Yizi Subdistrict.

== Administrative division ==
As of December 2015, the subdistrict is divided into 4 villages and 4 subdistricts:

- Yizi Community (亦资社区)
- Hongguo Community (红果社区)
- Donghe Community (东河社区)
- Baiyan Community (白岩社区)
- Shijiazhuang (石家庄村)
- Dahai (大海村)
- Xipu (西铺村)
- Shangjie (上街村)

== Economy ==
The main industries in and around the subdistrict is commerce.

== Transportation ==
The subdistrict has several roads and avenues, such as Dujuan Road (杜鹃路), Shengjing Avenue (胜境大道) and Fengming Road (凤鸣路).

== Attractions ==
The East Lake Park (东湖公园) is a public park in the subdistrict. The park is used for recreational activities, such as boating, walking, and fishing.

== See also ==
- List of township-level divisions of Guizhou
