= Huguo =

Huguo (Chinese: 护国) may refer to the following places in China:

- Huguo, Sichuan, a town in Luzhou, Sichuan
- Huguo Township, in Longchuan County, Yunnan
- Huguo Subdistrict, in Wuhua District, Kunming, Yunnan

== See also ==
- Huguo Temple (disambiguation)
