= Jiuying Bai, Yi and Miao Ethnic Township =

Coordinates: 25°50′12″N 104°45′43″E

Jiuying Bai, Yi and Miao Ethnic Township is an ethnic township in Panzhou, Liupanshui, Guizhou, China. It has an area of 101 sq km and a total population of 26000, 27% of which were Bai, Yi, or Miao. Jiuying is divided into Shangfang Village, Chating Village, Yangsong Village, Haimazhu Village, Jiuying Village, Honghua Village, Pingtian Village, Luojiatian Village, Badaohe Village, Xinzhai Village and Shuikou Village.

== See also ==
- List of township-level divisions of Guizhou
