= Pingdi Yi Ethnic Township =

Pingdi Yi Ethnic Township 坪地彝族乡
- Ethnic township
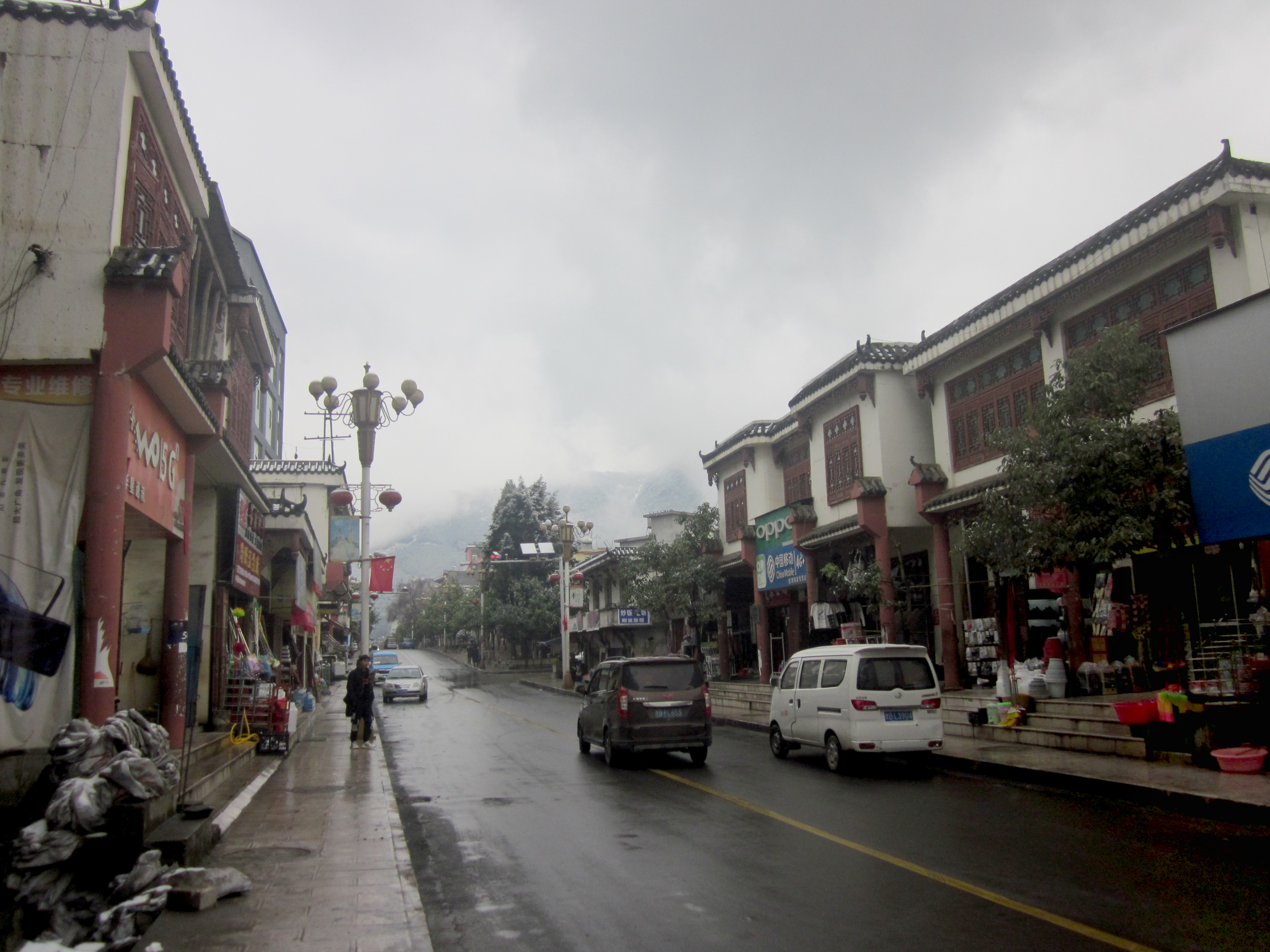
- Residential buildings in Pingdi Yi Ethnic Township, Panzhou, Guizhou, China, on December 5, 2019.
- Interactive map of Pingdi Yi Ethnic Township
- Coordinates: 26°06′30″N 104°35′50″E
- Country: People's Republic of China
- Province: Guizhou
- Prefecture-level city: Liupanshui
- County-level city: Panzhou

Area
  - Total: 152 km^{2} (59 sq mi)

Population (2015)
  - Total: 30,425
  - Density: 200/km^{2} (518/sq mi)
- Time zone: UTC+08:00 (China Standard)
- Postal code: 553528
- Area code: 0858

Chinese name
- Simplified Chinese: 坪地彝族乡
- Traditional Chinese: 坪地彝族鄉
Transcriptions
Standard Mandarin
- Hanyu Pinyin: Píngdì Yízú Xiāng

Pingdi Yi Ethnic Township (Chinese: 坪地彝族乡) is an ethnic township in Panzhou, Guizhou, China. As of the 2015 census it had a population of 30,425 and an area of 152-square-kilometre (59 sq mi).

== Administrative division ==
As of December 2015, the ethnic township is divided into 15 villages:

- Wangjiajing (王家箐村)
- Yingshang (营上村)
- Yuge (雨格村)
- Fachong (发冲村)
- Jingkou (箐口村)
- Moxili (莫西里村)
- Xiaoshulin (小树林村)
- Jiangdi (蒋底村)
- Baobaozhai (包包寨村)
- Geqingdi (格青底村)
- Chahe (岔河村)
- Baimuga (柏木嘎村)
- Qiguanyun (七官云村)
- Shakemei (沙克梅村)
- Shangshuge (上述格村)

== Geography ==
The ethnic township is in the subtropical plateau monsoon climate zone, with an average annual temperature of 11.7 °C (53.1 °F), total annual rainfall of 1,200-millimetre (47 in), and a frost-free period of 260 days.

== Economy ==
The ethnic township's main industries are agriculture, mining and tourism. Maize, potato and buckwheat are the main cash crops. Iron, copper and limestone are the main minerals.

== Transport ==
The Provincial Highway S212 passes across the town north to south.

== Attractions ==
The Wumeng Prairie Scenic Area (乌蒙大草原景区) is a national geological park and provincial scenic area in the ethnic township.

== See also ==
- List of township-level divisions of Guizhou
