= Danxia Town =

Danxia 丹霞镇
- Town
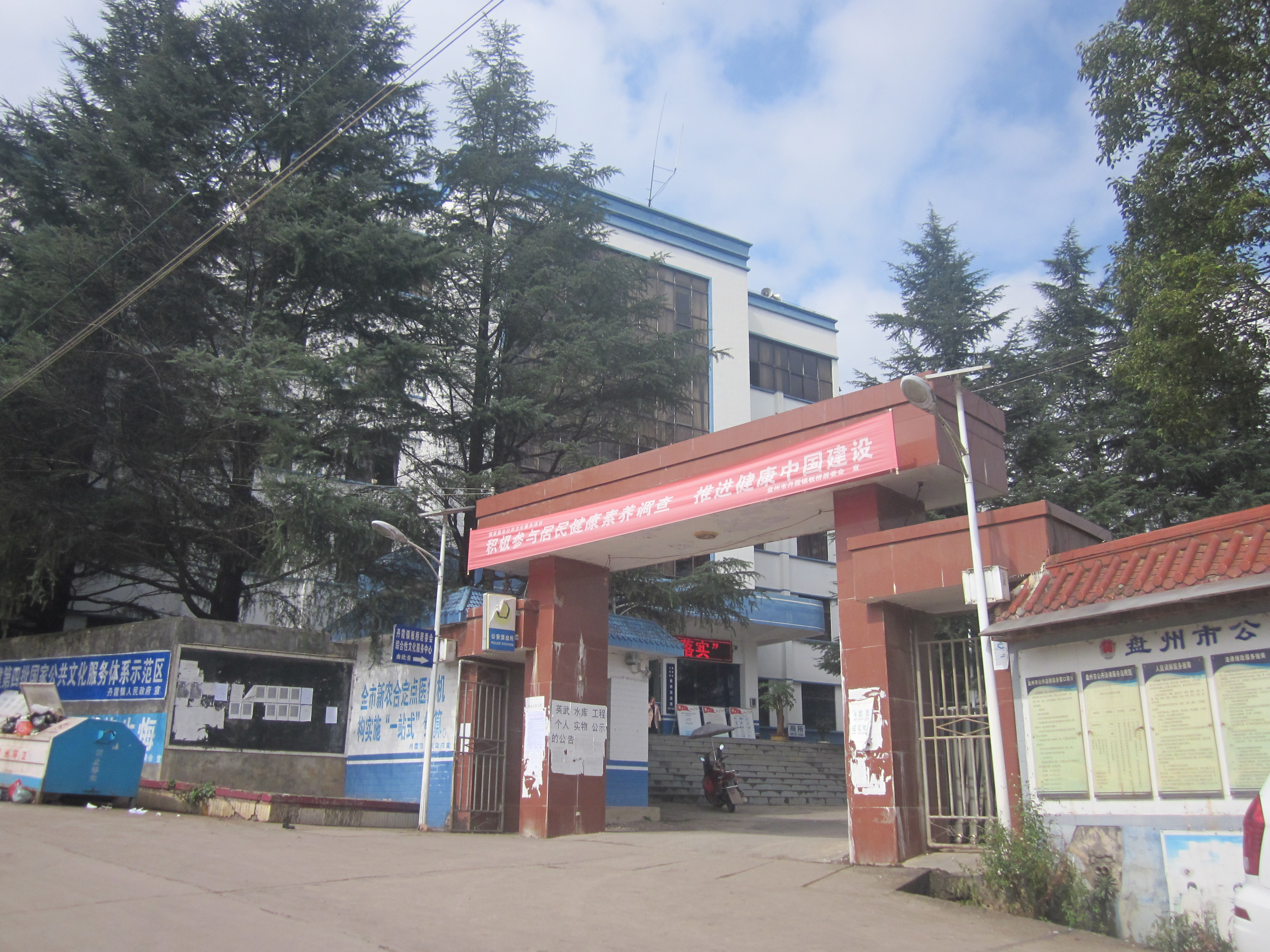
- The government building of Danxia Town.
- Interactive map of Danxia
- Coordinates: 25°41′10″N 104°36′49″E
- Country: People's Republic of China
- Province: Guizhou
- Prefecture-level city: Liupanshui
- County-level city: Panzhou

Area
  - Total: 175.35 km^{2} (67.70 sq mi)

Population (2017)
  - Total: 48,962
  - Density: 279.22/km^{2} (723.19/sq mi)
- Time zone: UTC+08:00 (China Standard)
- Postal code: 561601
- Area code: 0858

Chinese name
- Simplified Chinese: 丹霞镇
- Traditional Chinese: 丹霞鎮
Transcriptions
Standard Mandarin
- Hanyu Pinyin: Dānxiá Zhèn

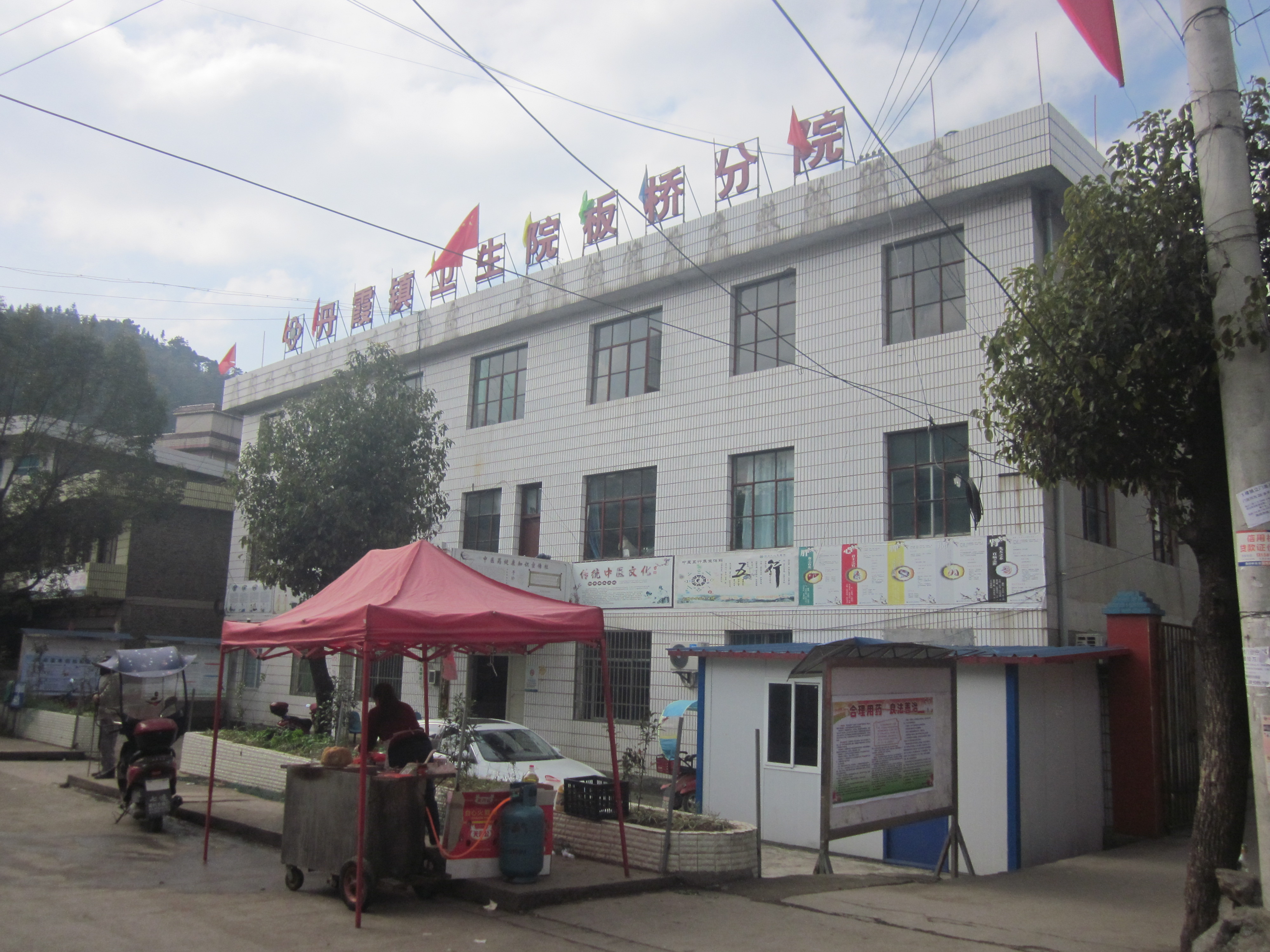
A hospital in Banqiao Community.

Danxia (Chinese: 丹霞镇) is a town in Panzhou, Guizhou, China. As of the 2017 census it had a population of 48,962 and an area of 175.35-square-kilometre (67.70 sq mi).

== History ==
On June 4, 2015, Shuitang Town (水塘镇) and some parts of Banqiao Town (板桥镇) were merged to form a new town named "Danxia".

== Administrative division ==
As of December 2015, the town is divided into 14 villages and 1 community:

- Banqiao Community (板桥社区)
- Sanzhai (三寨村)
- Lijiawan (李家湾村)
- Meizichong (梅子冲村)
- Beiyinjing (背阴箐村)
- Zhaoguantun (赵官屯村)
- Shunjutun (顺居屯村)
- Shuitang (水塘村)
- Guoguan (郭官村)
- Huangnitian (黄泥田村)
- Qiansuo (前所村)
- Mulong (木龙村)
- Taoyuan (桃园村)
- Huangba (荒坝村)
- Waishanlan (外山岚村)
- Lishanlan (里山岚村)
- Tiechang (铁厂村)
- Hetaoshu (核桃树村)
- Shadipo (沙地坡村)
- Cangpukeng (苍蒲坑村)
- Pingchuan (坪川村)

== Economy ==
The town's economy is based on nearby coal reserves and agricultural resources. Potatoes are the main crop.

== Transportation ==
The S77 Expressway and Provincial Highway S212 pass across the town north to south.

== Attractions ==
The Huguo Temple is a Buddhist temple in the town.

== See also ==
- List of township-level divisions of Guizhou
