= Panzhou =

Panzhou 盘州市
- County-level city
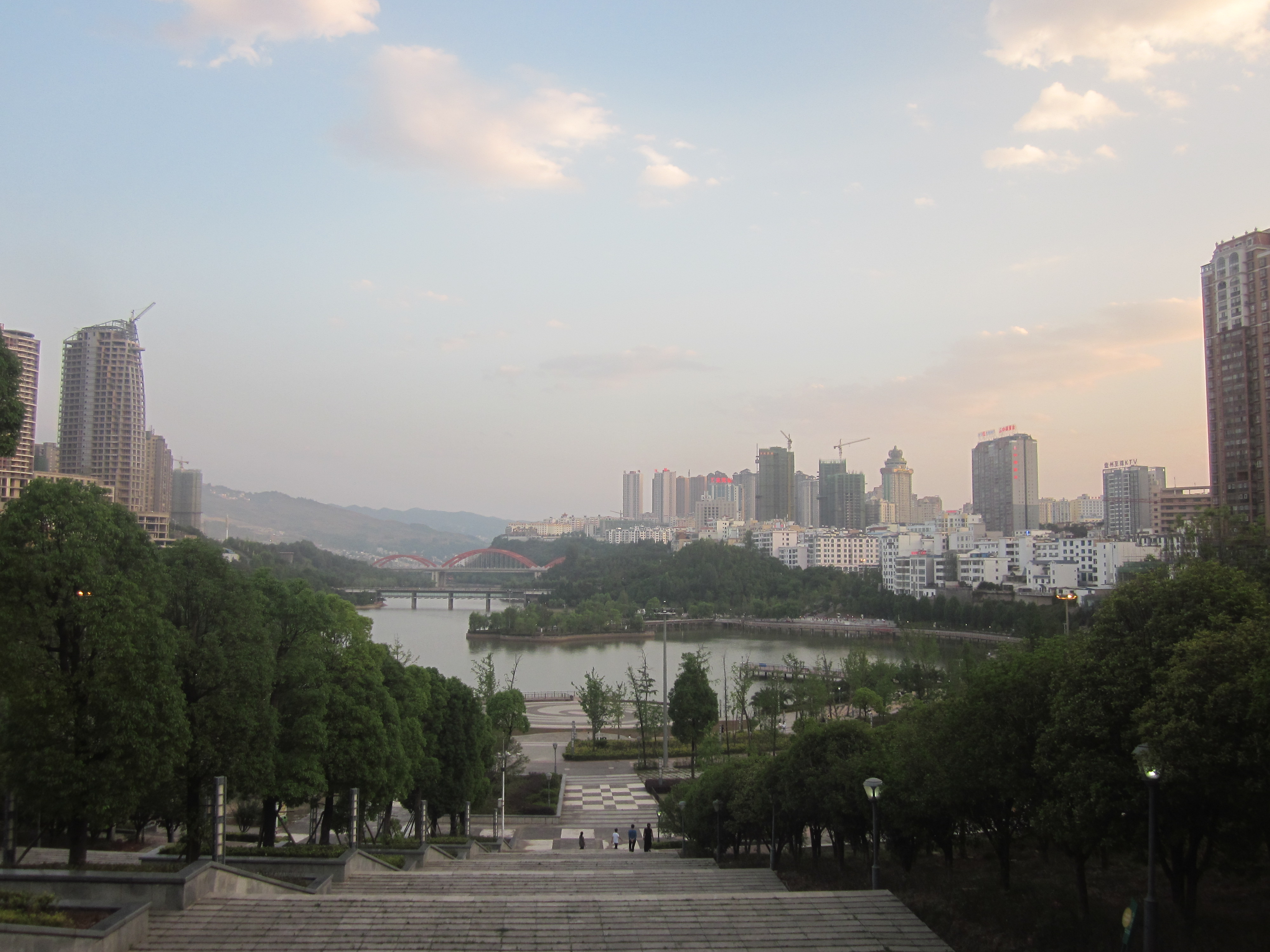

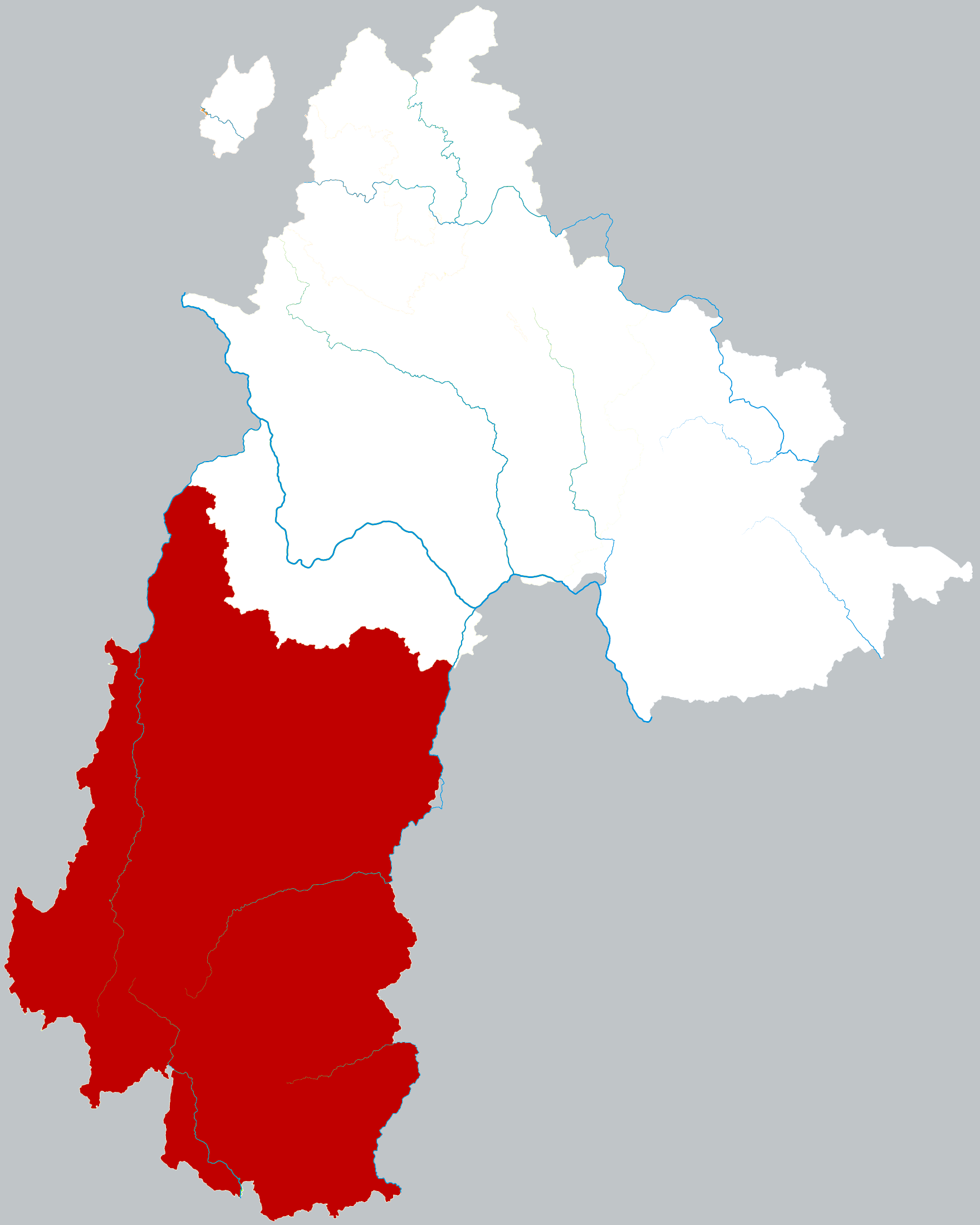
- Panzhou is the southernmost division in this map of Liupanshui

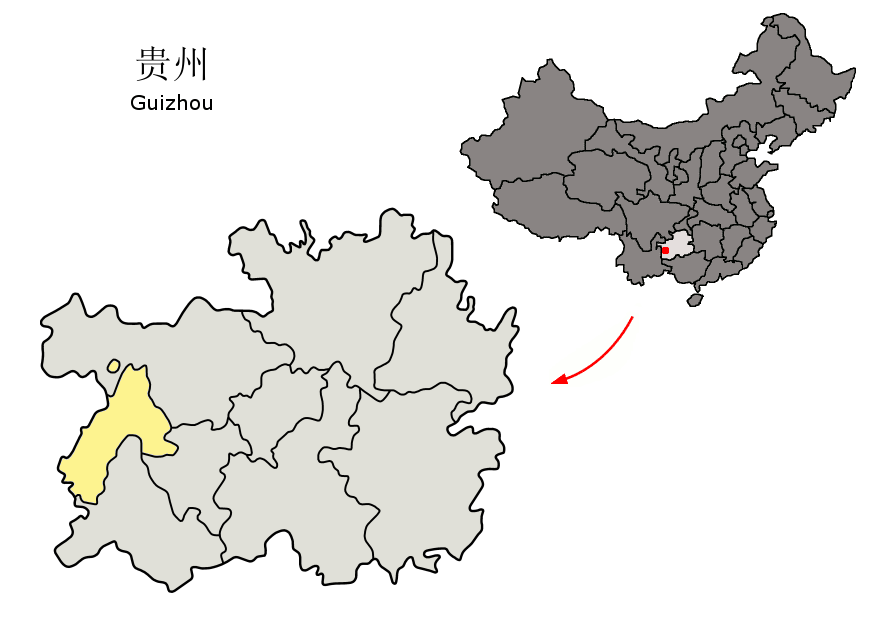
- Liupanshui in Guizhou
- Coordinates (Panzhou municipal government): 25°42′36″N 104°28′18″E
- Country: China
- Province: Guizhou
- Prefecture-level city: Liupanshui
- Municipal seat: Yizi Subdistrict

Area
  - Total: 4,056.7 km^{2} (1,566.3 sq mi)
- Highest elevation: 342 m (1,122 ft)

Population
  - Total: 1,034,903
  - Density: 255.11/km^{2} (660.73/sq mi)
- Time zone: UTC+08:00 (China Standard)
- Postal code: 553537
- Website: www.panxian.gov.cn

Panzhou (simplified Chinese: 盘州市; traditional Chinese: 盤州市; pinyin: Pánzhōu Shì) is a county-level city in southwestern Guizhou province, China, on the border with Yunnan province to the west. It is under the administration of the prefecture-level city of Liupanshui.

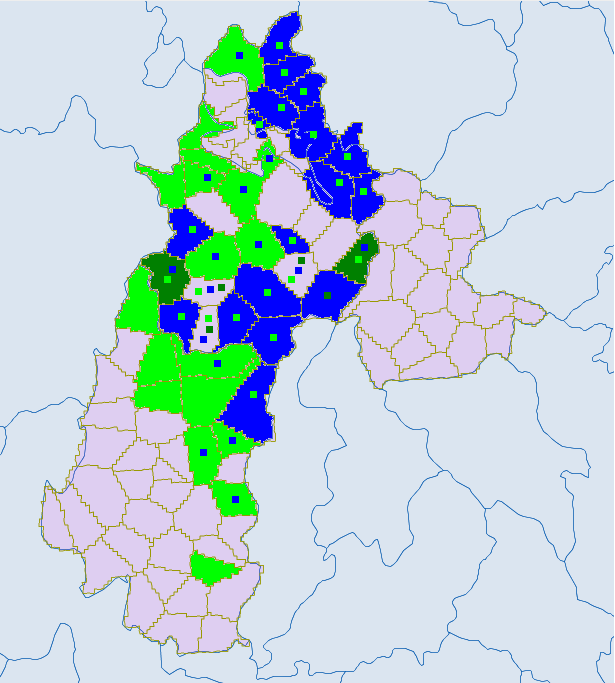
Ethnic townships in Liupanshui except Liuzhi. Light green -Yi. Blue - miao. Dark green- Bouyei

== Administrative divisions ==
Panzhou is divided into 6 subdistricts, 14 towns and 7 ethnic townships:

=== Subdistricts ===
- Yizi Subdistrict (亦资街道)
- Hanlin Subdistrict (翰林街道)
- Lianghe Subdistrict (两河街道)
- Hongguo Subdistrict (红果街道)
- Shengjing Subdistrict (胜境街道)
- Liuguan Subdistrict (刘官街道)

=== Towns ===
- Minzhu Town (民主镇)
- Dashan Town (大山镇)
- Baotian Town (保田镇)
- Shiqiao Town (石桥镇)
- Xiangshui Town (响水镇)
- Baiguo Town (柏果镇)
- Xinmin Town (新民镇)
- Panguan Town (盘关镇)
- Zhuhai Town (竹海镇)
- Yingwu Town (英武镇)
- Jichangping Town (鸡场坪镇)
- Shuangfeng Town (双凤镇)
- Danxia Town (丹霞镇)
- Wumeng Town (乌蒙镇)

=== Ethnic townships ===
- Putian Hui Ethnic Township (普田回族乡)
- Pingdi Yi Ethnic Township (坪地彝族乡)
- Yuni Yi Ethnic Township (淤泥彝族乡)
- Pugu Yi and Miao Ethnic Township (普古彝族苗族乡)
- Jiuying Bai, Yi and Miao Ethnic Township (旧营白族彝族苗族乡)
- Yangchang Bouyei, Bai and Miao Ethnic Township (羊场布依族白族苗族乡)
- Baoji Miao and Yi Ethnic Township (保基苗族彝族乡)

== Geography ==
Panzhou is located in western Guizhou province and southwestern Liupanshui. Panzhou shares a border with Fuyuan County and Xuanwei to the west, Pu'an County to the east, Shuicheng District to the north, and Xingyi to the south. Panzhou has a total area of 4,056 km^{2} (1,566 sq mi).

=== Geology ===
Panzhou is located in the South China Karst, with mostly on a mountain plateau. The terrain elevation is high in the northwest, low in the southeast, and uplifted in the center and south.

=== Climate ===
Panzhou has a humid subtropical climate with monsoon influence. It has an average annual temperature of 15.2 °C (59.4 °F), total annual rainfall of 1,390 millimetres (55 in), a frost-free period of 271 days and an average of 1593 annual sunshine hours. Winters are mild and summers are cool.

Climate data for Panzhou, elevation 1,800 m (5,900 ft), (1991–2020 normals, extremes 1991–present)
Month	Jan	Feb	Mar	Apr	May	Jun	Jul	Aug	Sep	Oct	Nov	Dec	Year
Record high °C (°F)	26.6 (79.9)	30.6 (87.1)	31.4 (88.5)	33.4 (92.1)	35.1 (95.2)	33.7 (92.7)	31.7 (89.1)	32.5 (90.5)	31.9 (89.4)	28.9 (84.0)	27.8 (82.0)	28.9 (84.0)	35.1 (95.2)
Mean daily maximum °C (°F)	11.8 (53.2)	15.4 (59.7)	19.2 (66.6)	22.7 (72.9)	24.6 (76.3)	24.4 (75.9)	25.1 (77.2)	25.1 (77.2)	22.8 (73.0)	19.2 (66.6)	17.2 (63.0)	12.0 (53.6)	20.0 (67.9)
Daily mean °C (°F)	6.8 (44.2)	8.5 (47.3)	12.7 (54.9)	17.0 (62.6)	19.4 (66.9)	21.2 (70.2)	21.8 (71.2)	21.3 (70.3)	19.1 (66.4)	15.7 (60.3)	12.1 (53.8)	8.0 (46.4)	15.3 (59.5)
Mean daily minimum °C (°F)	2.9 (37.2)	5.3 (41.5)	8.3 (46.9)	12.1 (53.8)	14.8 (58.6)	16.7 (62.1)	17.5 (63.5)	16.8 (62.2)	15.2 (59.4)	12.1 (53.8)	8.0 (46.4)	4.0 (39.2)	11.1 (52.0)
Record low °C (°F)	−6.0 (21.2)	−4.7 (23.5)	−1.8 (28.8)	1.8 (35.2)	5.9 (42.6)	10.1 (50.2)	12.3 (54.1)	11.2 (52.2)	5.0 (41.0)	2.8 (37.0)	−2.5 (27.5)	−4.9 (23.2)	−6.0 (21.2)
Average precipitation mm (inches)	20.0 (0.79)	13.3 (0.52)	32.9 (1.30)	51.7 (2.04)	127.9 (5.04)	296.2 (11.66)	222.5 (8.76)	168.9 (6.65)	160.8 (6.33)	83.1 (3.27)	26.4 (1.04)	24.3 (0.96)	1,228 (48.36)
Average precipitation days (≥ 0.1 mm)	12.6	8.9	10.2	11.4	13.9	20.6	19.1	19.0	15.7	16.6	9.6	12.6	170.2
Average snowy days	3.1	2.5	0.2	0	0	0	0	0	0	0	0.1	1.4	7.3
Average relative humidity (%)	77	66	65	64	69	80	80	80	81	83	77	80	75
Mean monthly sunshine hours	124.3	155.9	168.2	177.7	170.3	104.6	129.4	146.6	113.3	104.6	145.4	107.3	1,647.6
Percentage possible sunshine	37	49	45	46	41	26	31	37	31	29	45	33	38
Source: China Meteorological Administration

Climate data for Shuangfeng Town, Panzhou, elevation 1,527 m (5,010 ft), (1981–2010 normals, extremes 1971–2010)
Month	Jan	Feb	Mar	Apr	May	Jun	Jul	Aug	Sep	Oct	Nov	Dec	Year
Record high °C (°F)	26.3 (79.3)	30.6 (87.1)	32.3 (90.1)	34.1 (93.4)	35.1 (95.2)	33.8 (92.8)	32.9 (91.2)	32.5 (90.5)	32.3 (90.1)	29.5 (85.1)	28.9 (84.0)	28.9 (84.0)	35.1 (95.2)
Mean daily maximum °C (°F)	12.2 (54.0)	13.9 (57.0)	19.1 (66.4)	23.3 (73.9)	25.1 (77.2)	26.1 (79.0)	26.7 (80.1)	26.6 (79.9)	24.1 (75.4)	20.4 (68.7)	17.6 (63.7)	13.6 (56.5)	20.7 (69.3)
Daily mean °C (°F)	6.8 (44.2)	8.5 (47.3)	12.7 (54.9)	17.0 (62.6)	19.4 (66.9)	21.2 (70.2)	21.8 (71.2)	21.3 (70.3)	19.1 (66.4)	15.7 (60.3)	12.1 (53.8)	8.0 (46.4)	15.3 (59.5)
Mean daily minimum °C (°F)	3.4 (38.1)	4.9 (40.8)	8.3 (46.9)	12.5 (54.5)	15.3 (59.5)	17.8 (64.0)	18.5 (65.3)	17.8 (64.0)	15.8 (60.4)	12.7 (54.9)	8.7 (47.7)	4.3 (39.7)	11.7 (53.0)
Record low °C (°F)	−5.8 (21.6)	−7.9 (17.8)	−2.6 (27.3)	1.7 (35.1)	6.7 (44.1)	10.3 (50.5)	11.0 (51.8)	11.0 (51.8)	6.5 (43.7)	1.9 (35.4)	−1.9 (28.6)	−5.6 (21.9)	−7.9 (17.8)
Average precipitation mm (inches)	22.5 (0.89)	23.6 (0.93)	30.3 (1.19)	48.1 (1.89)	153.7 (6.05)	306.8 (12.08)	264.8 (10.43)	211.0 (8.31)	135.9 (5.35)	96.3 (3.79)	37.3 (1.47)	17.6 (0.69)	1,347.9 (53.07)
Average precipitation days (≥ 0.1 mm)	14.4	13.7	12.0	13.1	18.2	20.3	21.1	18.9	17.7	16.8	12.6	11.0	189.8
Average relative humidity (%)	79	75	69	68	73	79	81	81	81	83	80	79	77
Mean monthly sunshine hours	101.8	107.9	167.4	176.3	158.1	120.7	161.0	168.0	125.3	102.3	105.8	107.0	1,601.6
Source 1: China Meteorological Administration
Source 2: Weather China Renrendoc (sun)

== Economy ==
Panzhou is one of the most developed counties in Guizhou; it ranked the 84th in the Top100 of counties and county-level citities of China by comprehensive strength in 2020.

== Demographics ==
=== Population ===
As of the 2019 census, there were 1,305,666 people and 446,784 households residing in Panzhou. There are 1,070,700 permanent residents in the city. There are 29 ethnic groups living in Panzhou. Among the 28 ethnic minorities, 6 are local minorities, including 126,000 Yi, 38,000 Bai, 33,000 Miao, 22,000 Bouyei, 9,500 Hui and 6,500 Sui, accounting for 20.83% of the total population. There are 15,000 people in the other 22 minorities, including Mongolians, Manchu, Tujia, Dong, Gelao and Zhuang.

=== Language ===
Mandarin is the official language. The local people speak both Southwestern Mandarin and minority languages (Bouyei, Miao, Yi and other languages).

=== Religion ===
The county government supports all religions. The local people mainly believe in Chinese folk religion, Buddhism, Taoism and Catholicism. There are twenty Buddhist temples, one Taoist temple, three Islamic mosques, one Catholic church and seven Protestant churches in Panzhou.

== Culture and tourism ==
There are two national 4A scenic areas in Panzhou: the Tuole Ancient Ginkgo Scenic Area (妥乐古银杏景区) and the Dala Fairy Valley Scenic Area (哒啦仙谷旅游景区). There are also three provincial tourist resorts and three provincial tourist scenic spots. The Pan County Dadong Ancient Cultural Site is the only national relic protection unit in Panzhou. There are five provincial culture and relics sites, including the Pan'anzhou Confucius Temple (普安州文庙), the City God Temple (城隍庙), and the former residence of Zhang Daofan (Chang Tao-fan; 张道藩故居). The Wumeng Prairie Scenic Area (乌蒙大草原景区) is a famous scenic area in all of Guizhou.

Major Buddhist Temples in Panzhou include Guanyin Temple (观音寺) and Huguo Temple (or Protect the Country Temple).

=== Parks ===
Panzhou has two major public parks: the East Lake Park and the South Lake Park.

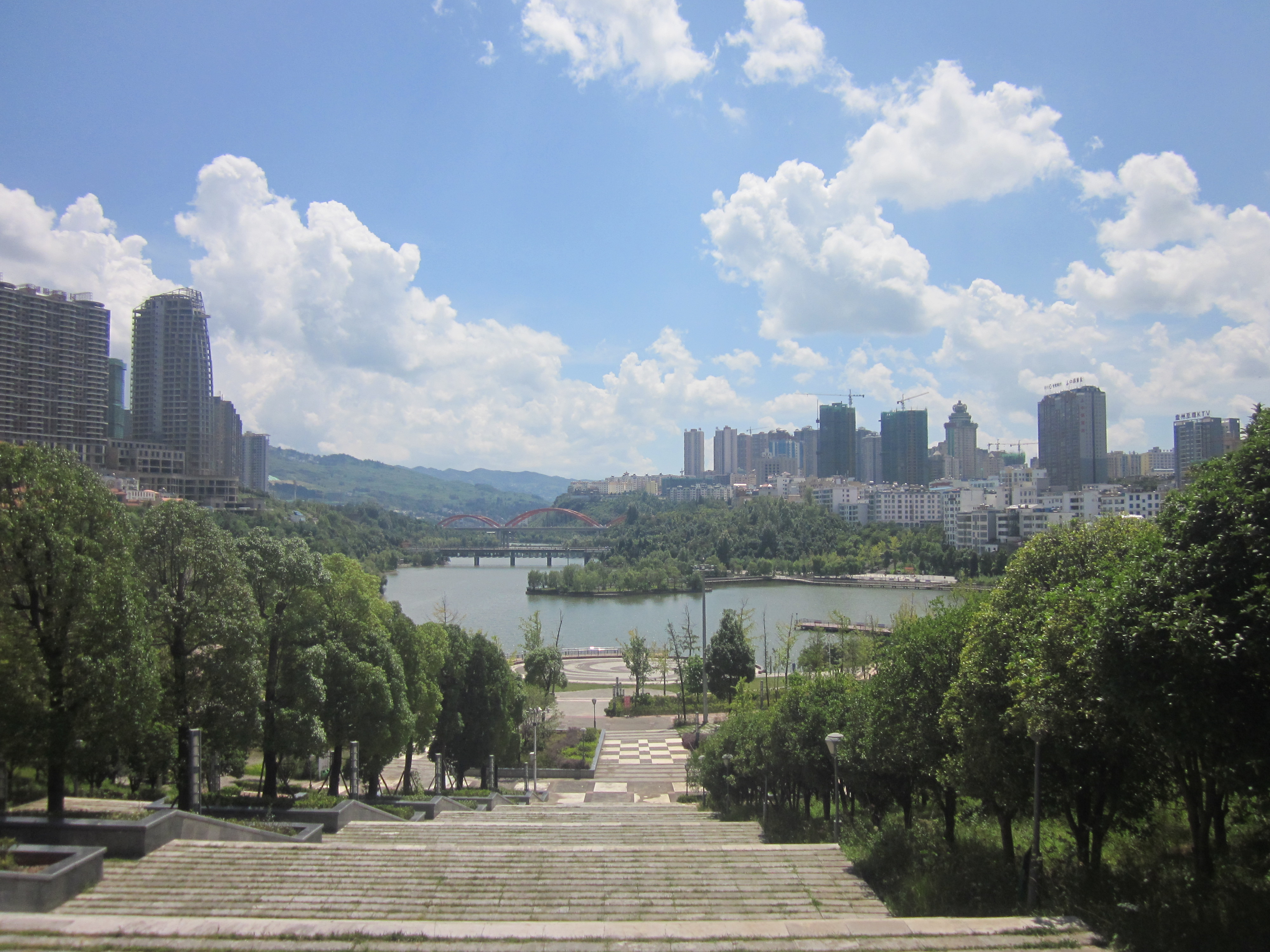
A commanding view of the East Lake Park

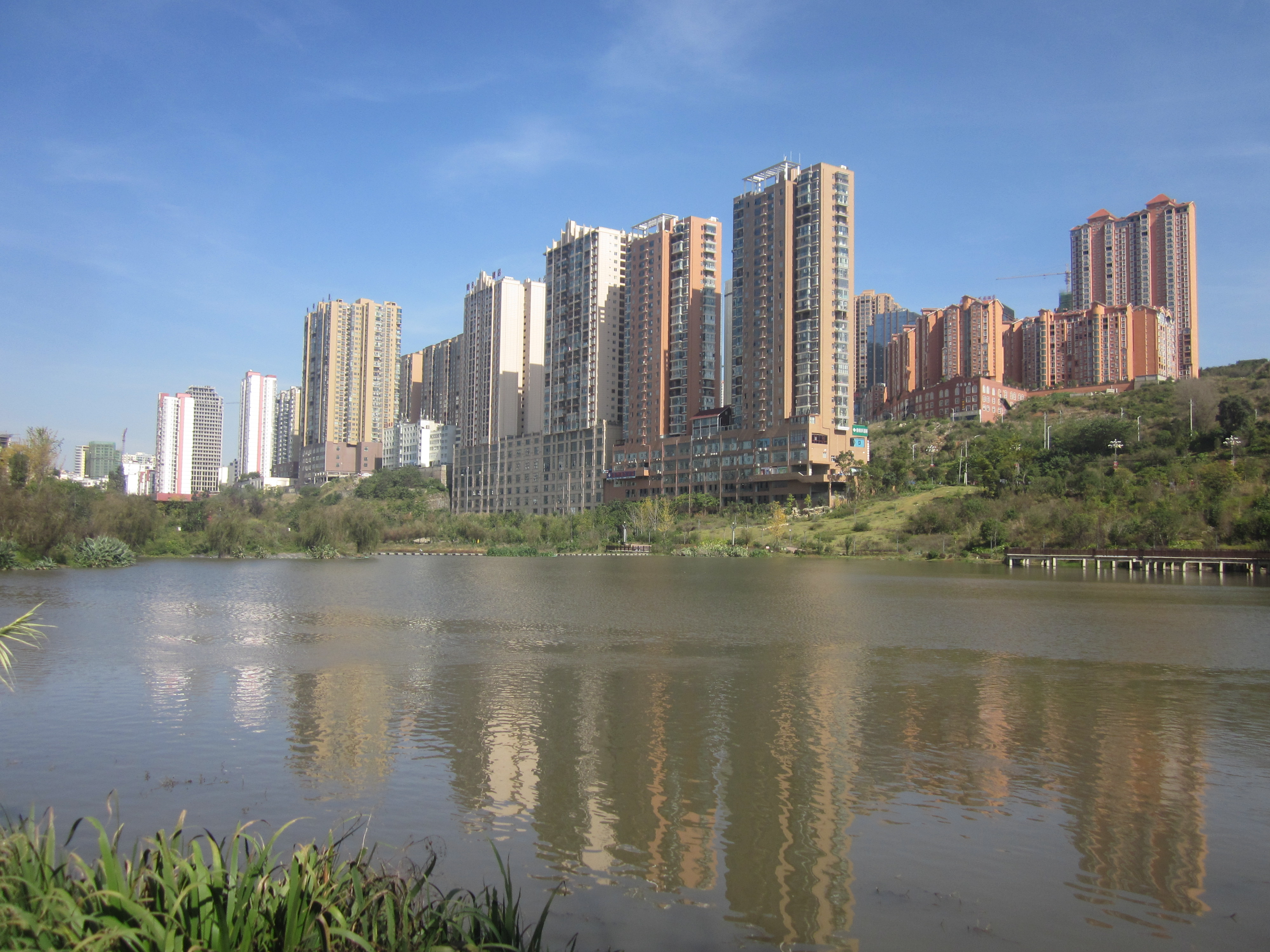
Residential buildings near the South Lake Park

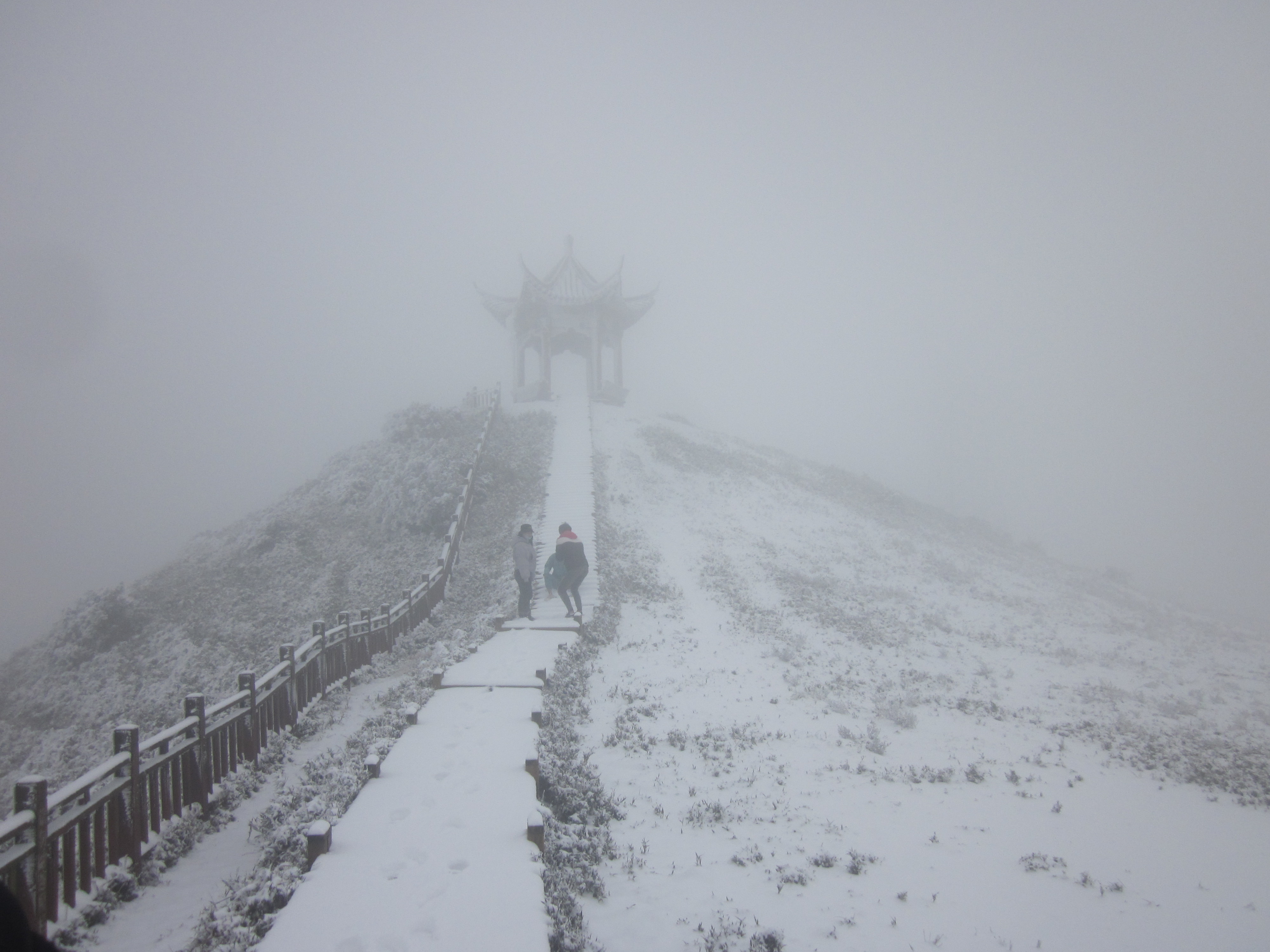
All the mountains and plains of the Wumeng Prairie Scenic Area are snowed under

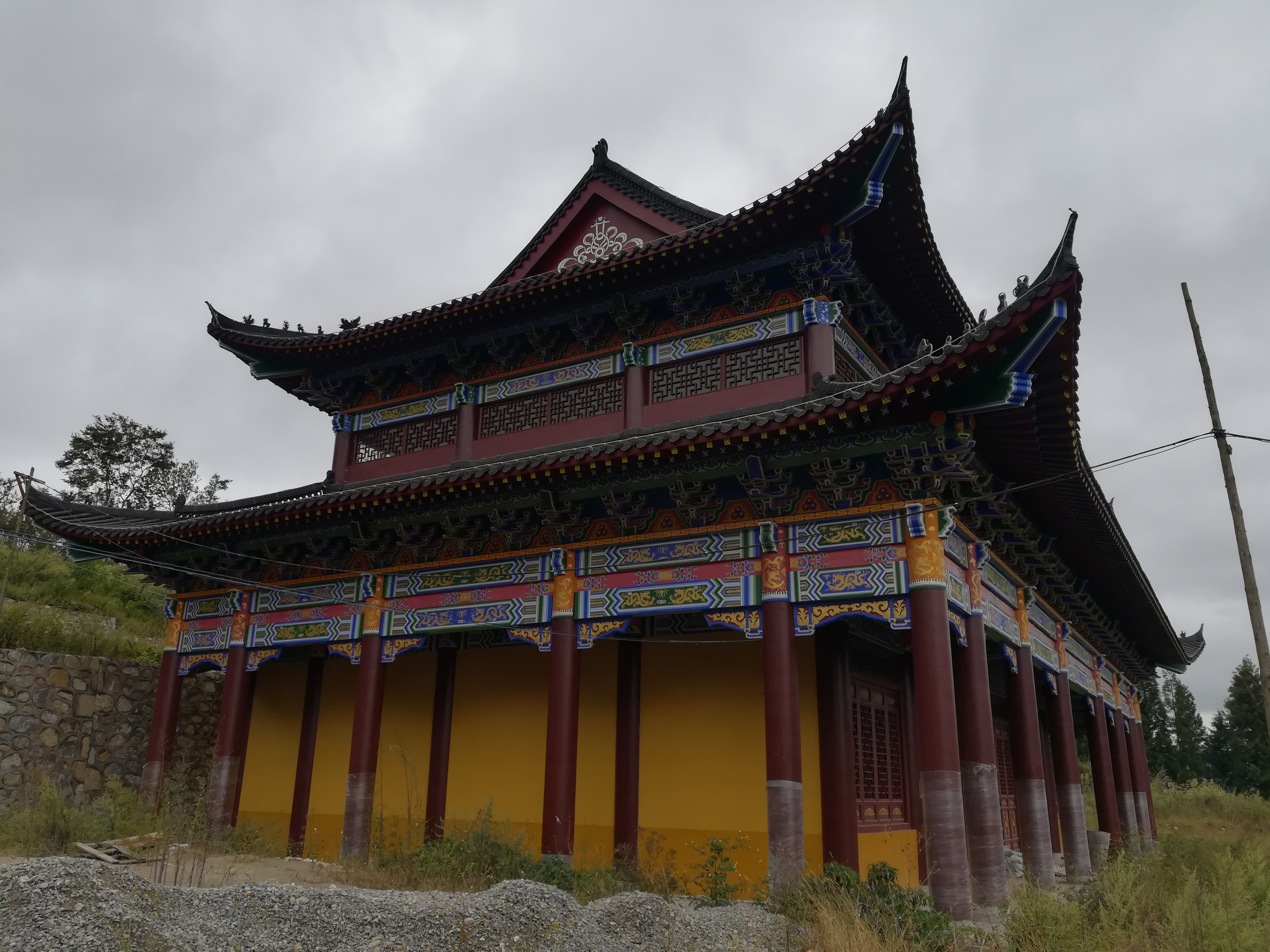
Mahavira Hall, Guanyin Temple

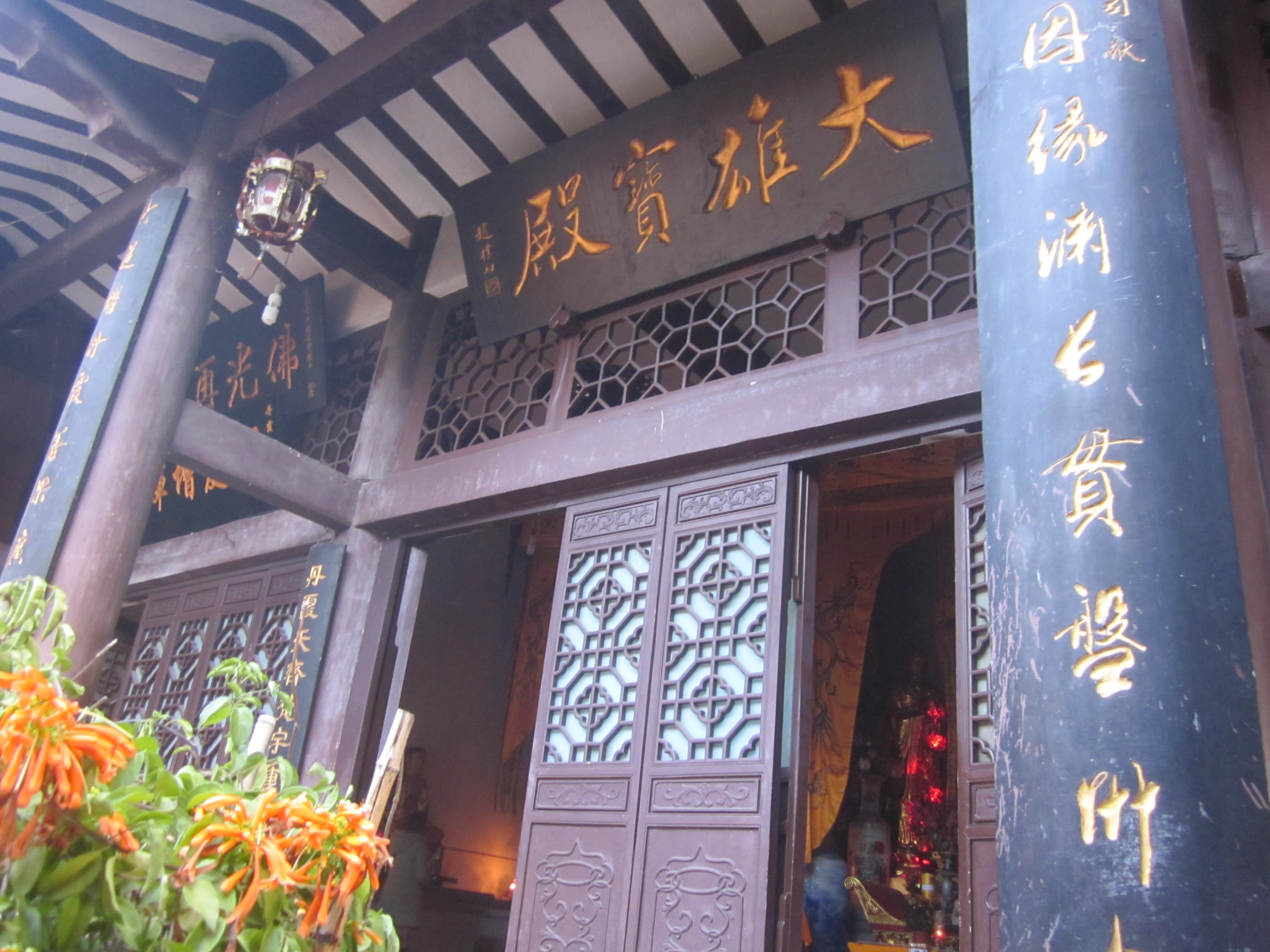
Mahavira Hall, Huguo Temple

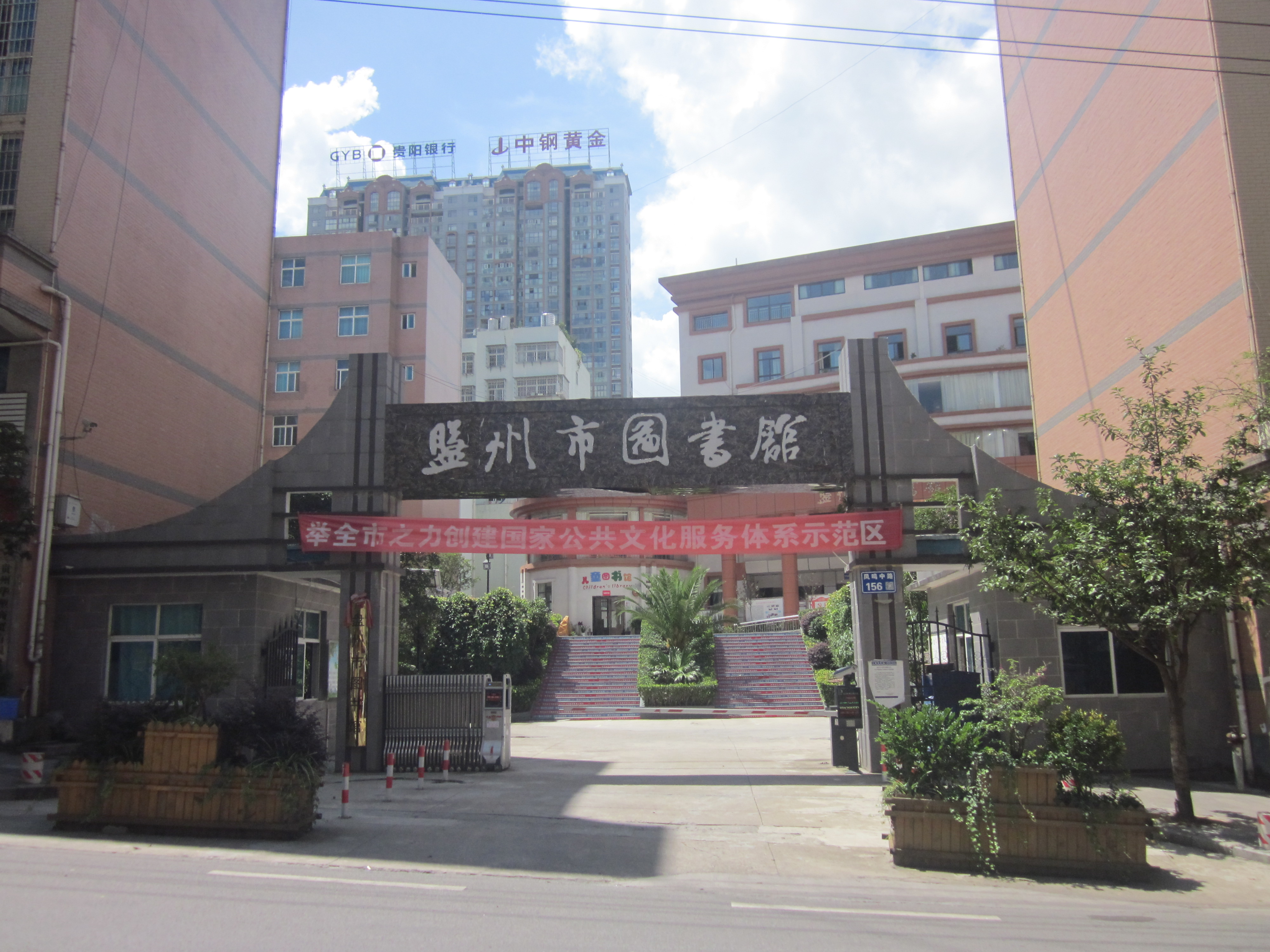
Panzhou Library

== Transportation ==
The city has one high-speed railway station, Panzhou, on the Shanghai–Kunming line. There are several conventional railway stations in the City on three lines: the Panxi railway, Liupanshui–Hongguo railway, and the Weishe–Hongguo railway. These three lines meet at Hongguo railway station in Hongguo Subdistrict.

== Notable people ==
- Long Zhaoxi (陇朝喜), a Tusi in the Yuan dynasty.
- Shao Yuanshan (邵元善), Ming dynasty politician.
- Jiang Zonglu (蒋宗鲁), Ming dynasty politician.
- Wang Zuoyuan (王祚远), Ming dynasty politician.
- Meng Benchun (孟本淳), Ming dynasty military officer.
- Zhang Lingxiang (张凌翔), Muslim uprising leader.
- Ma Hetu (马河图), Muslim uprising leader.
- Chang Tao-fan, politician in the Republic of China who served as President of the Legislative Yuan between 1952 and 1961.
