= Huguo Temple (Wenzhou) =

Buddhist temple in Zhejiang, China

- 护国寺
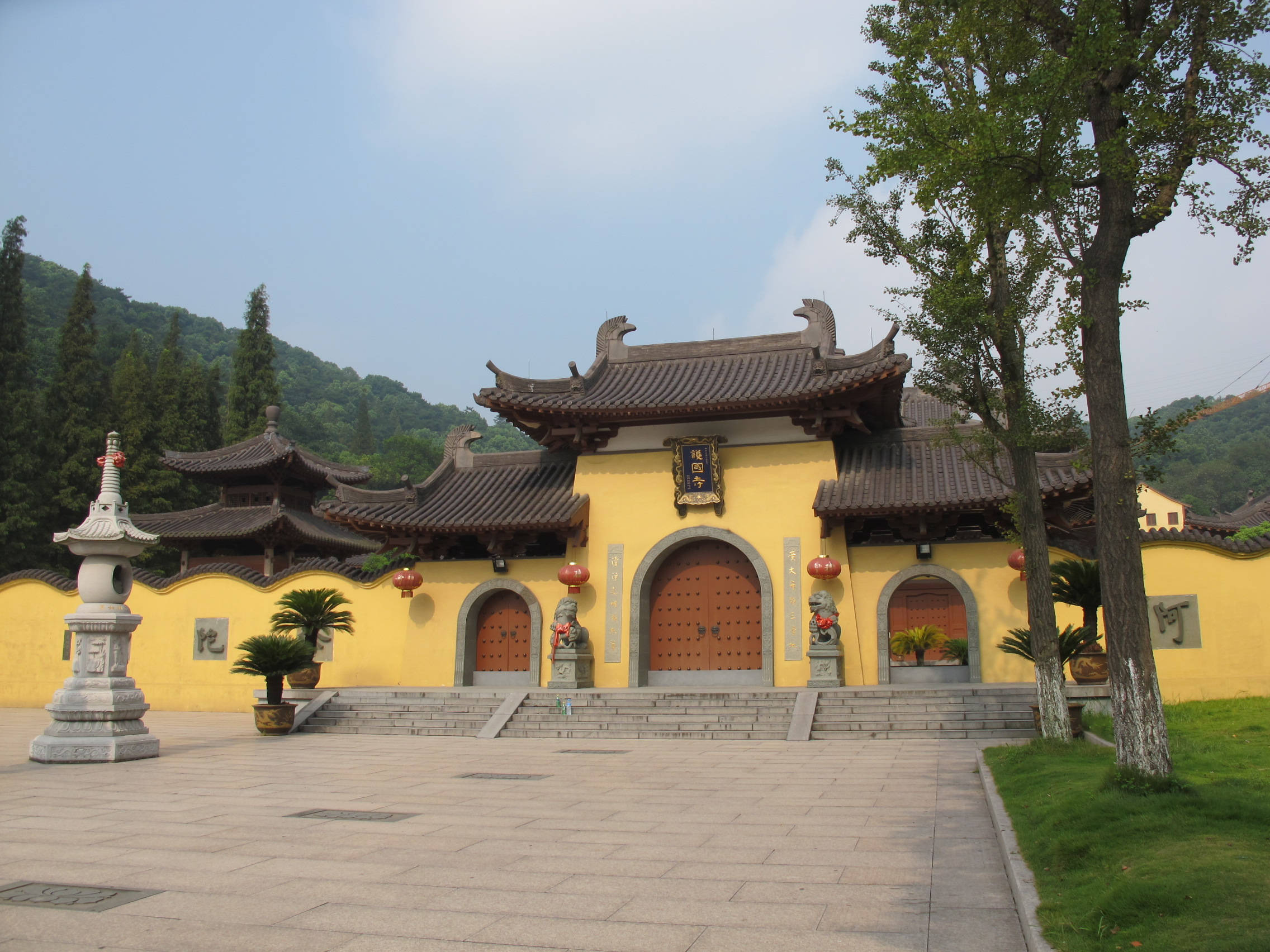
- The Shanmen at Huguo Temple.

- Location within Zhejiang

Religion
- Affiliation: Buddhism
- Deity: Linji school
- Leadership: Shi Liaozheng (释了证)

Location
- Location: Jingshan Park, Ouhai District, Wenzhou, Zhejiang
- Country: China
- Interactive map of Huguo Temple
- Coordinates: 28°00′10.32″N 120°37′35.8″E

Architecture
- Style: Chinese architecture
- Established: 785
- Completed: 2003–2009

Huguo Temple (simplified Chinese: 护国寺; traditional Chinese: 護國寺; pinyin: Hùguó Sì) is a Buddhist temple located in Jingshan Park (景山公园), Wenzhou, Zhejiang.

== History ==
The temple was first built in 785, under the Tang dynasty (618–907), and went through many changes and repairs through the following dynasties. Most of the present structures in the temple were rebuilt or renovated between 2003 and 2009.

== Architecture ==
The complex modeled the architectural style of the Tang dynasty (618–907). The complex include the following halls: Shanmen, Mahavira Hall, Hall of Four Heavenly Kings, Hall of Guanyin, Bell tower, Drum tower, Hall of Jade Buddha, Hall of Guru, Dharma Hall, Dharma Hall, Meditation Hall, Reception Hall, Dining Room, etc.

== Gallery ==
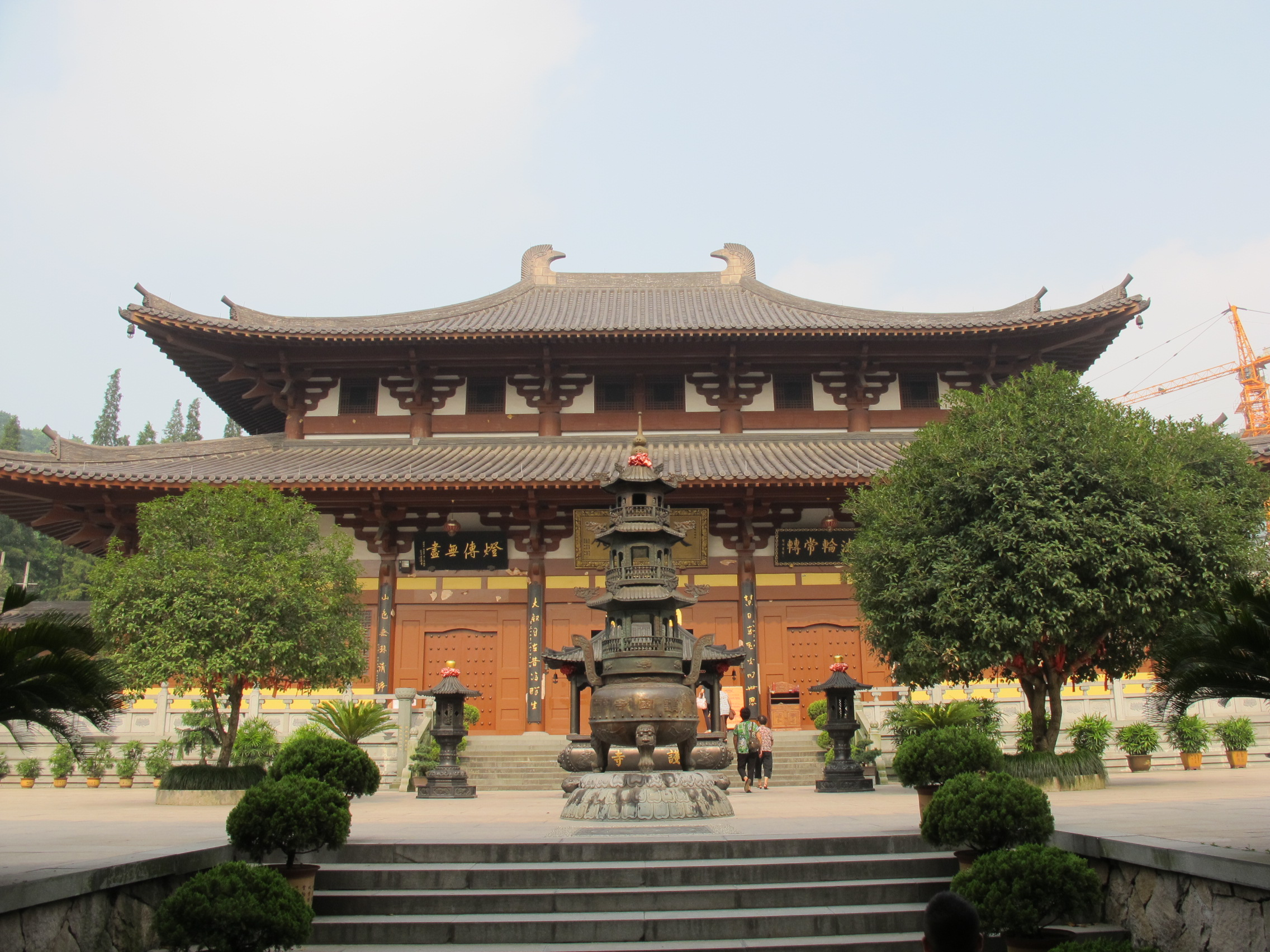
Mahavira Hall.

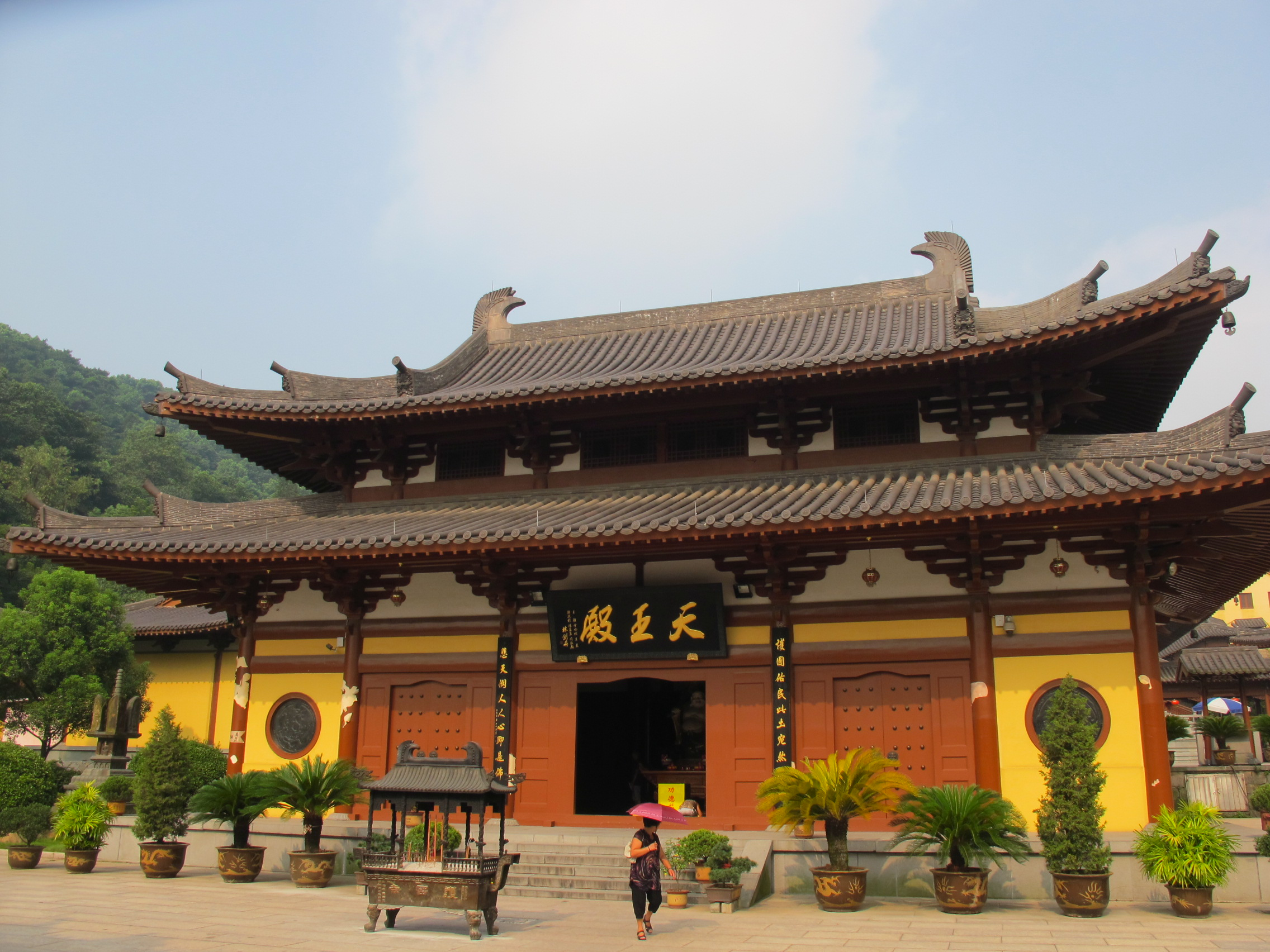
Hall of Four Heavenly Kings.

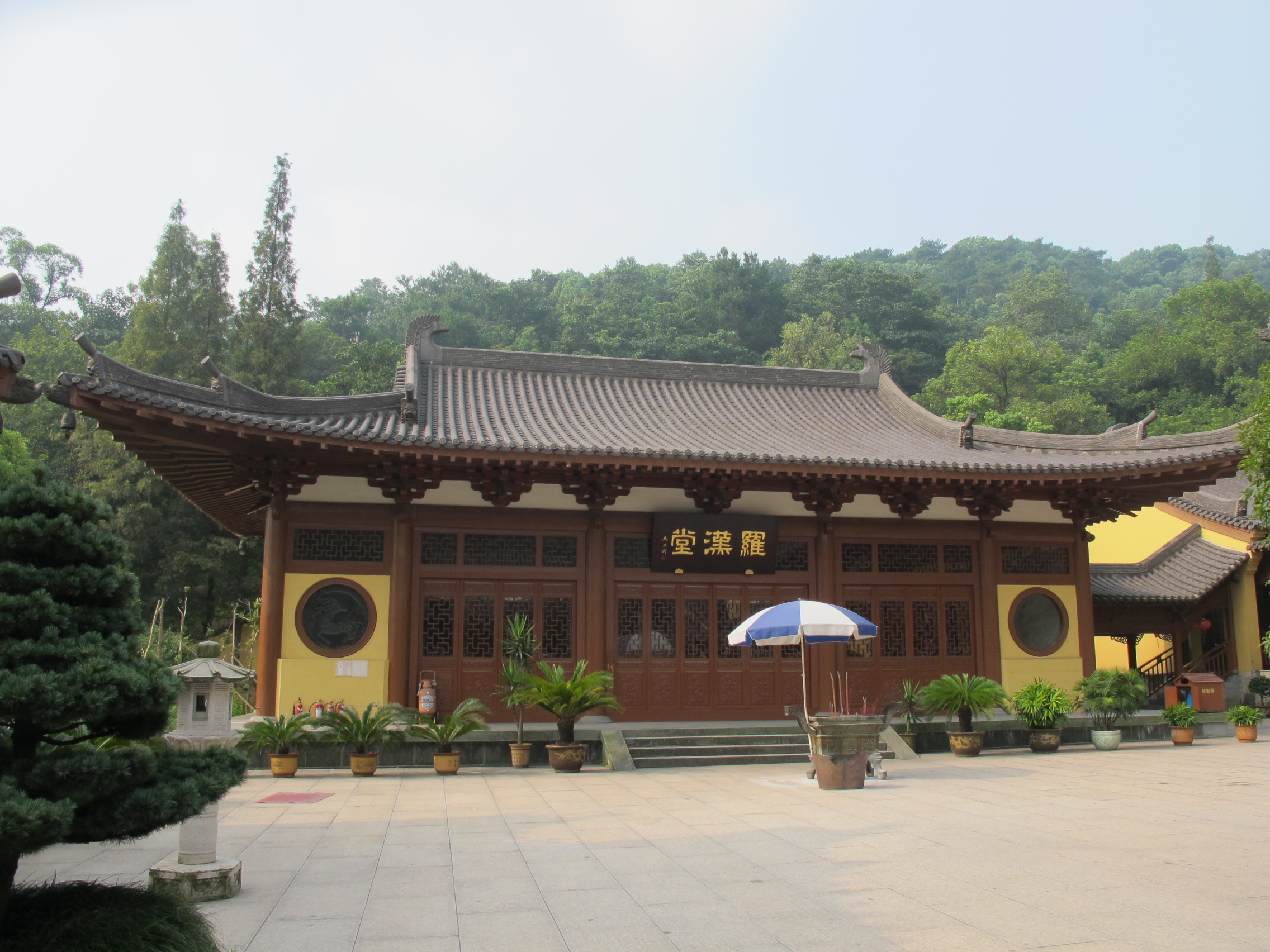
Hall of Arhats.

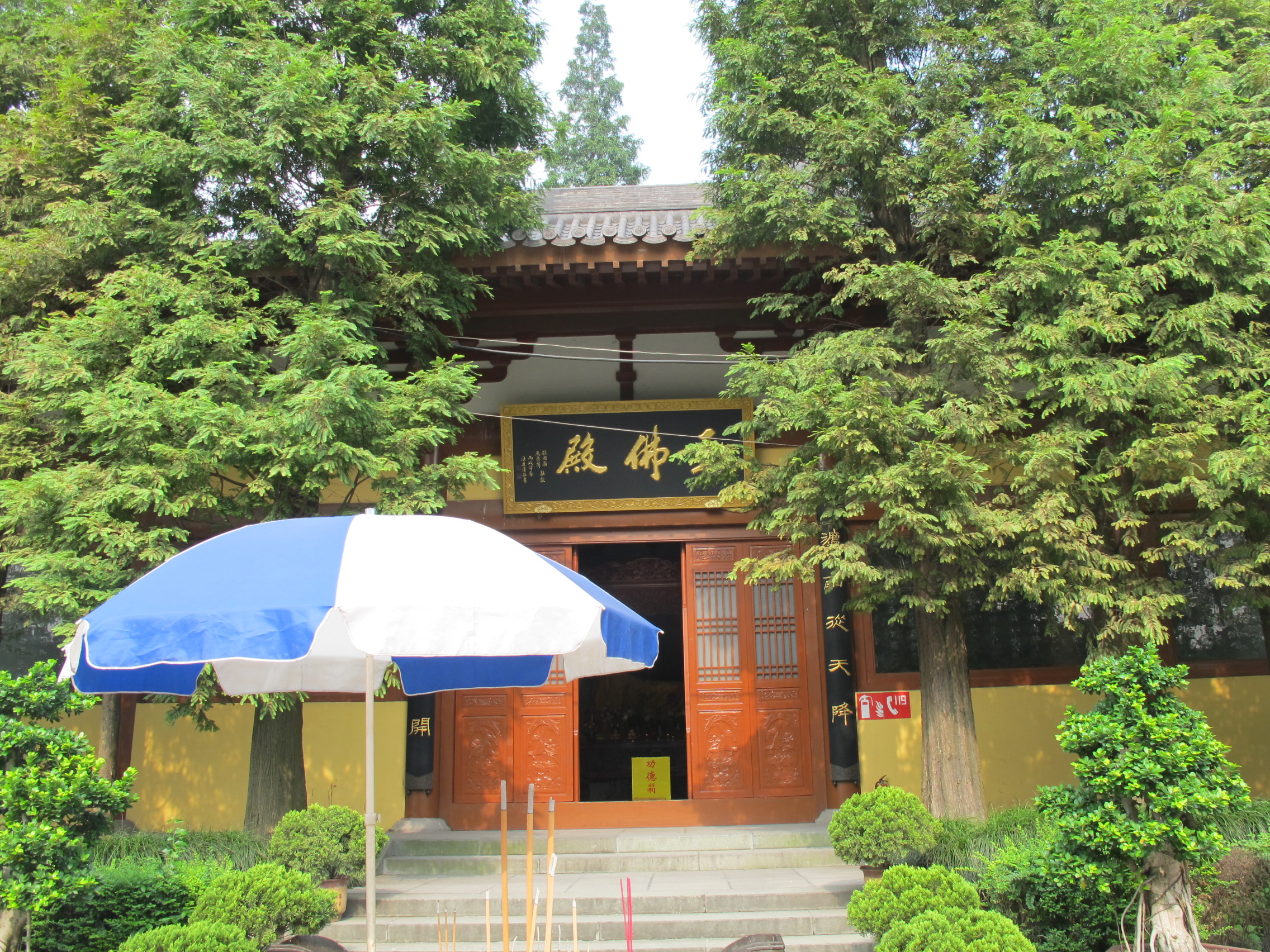
Hall of Jade Buddha.

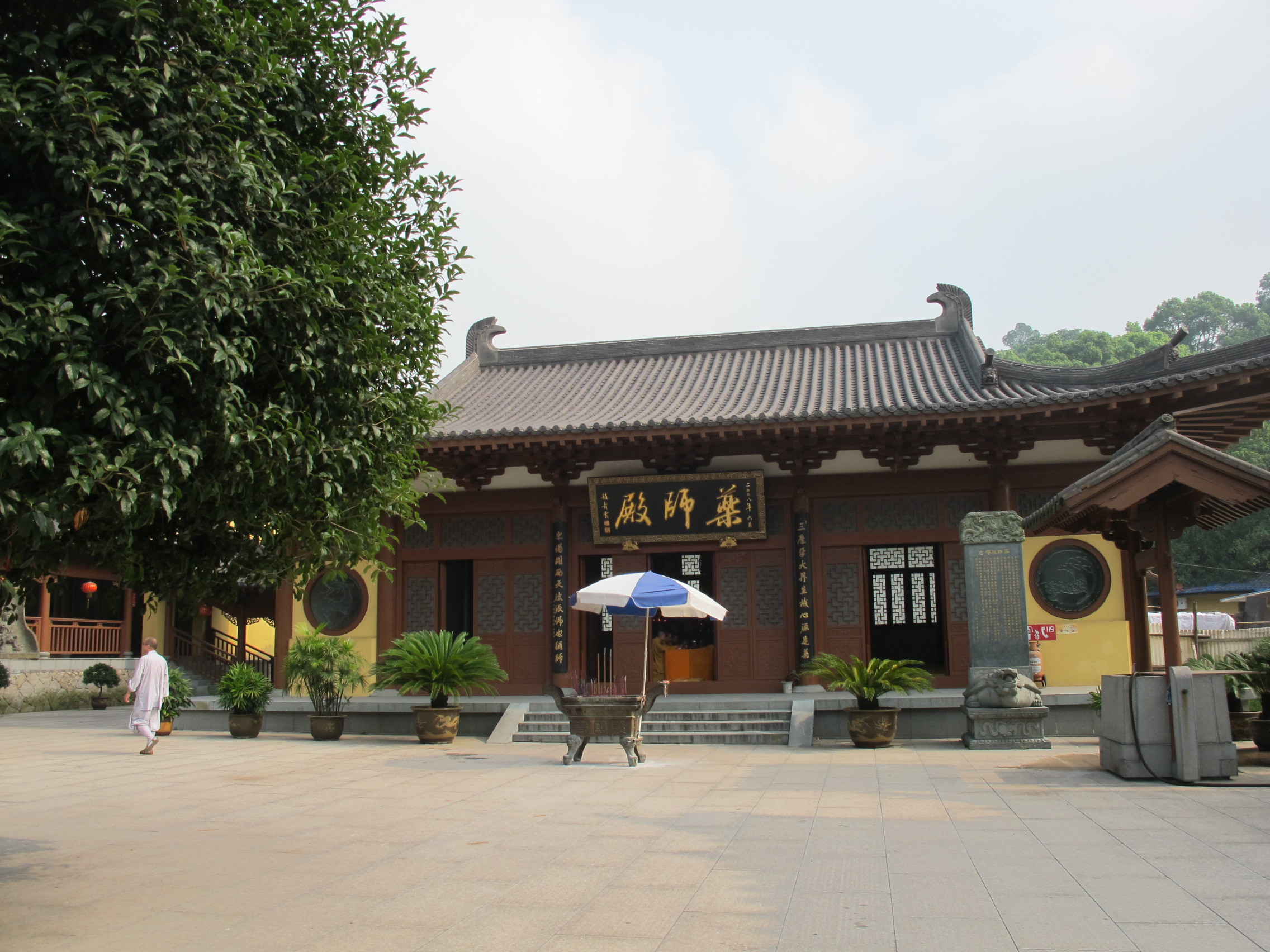
Hall of Bhaisajyaguru

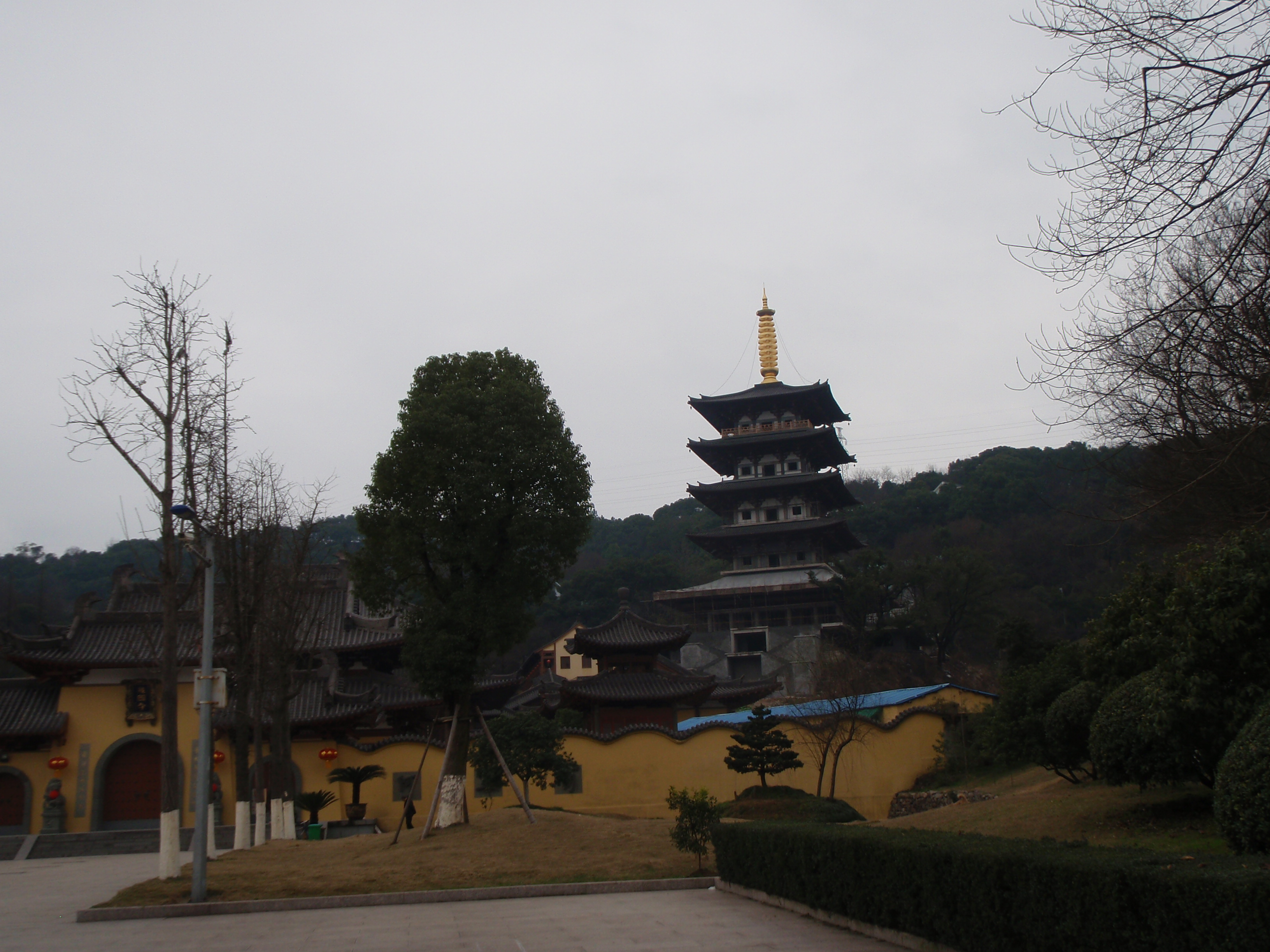
Pagoda.
