= Hongguo Subdistrict =

Hongguo Subdistrict 红果街道
- Subdistrict
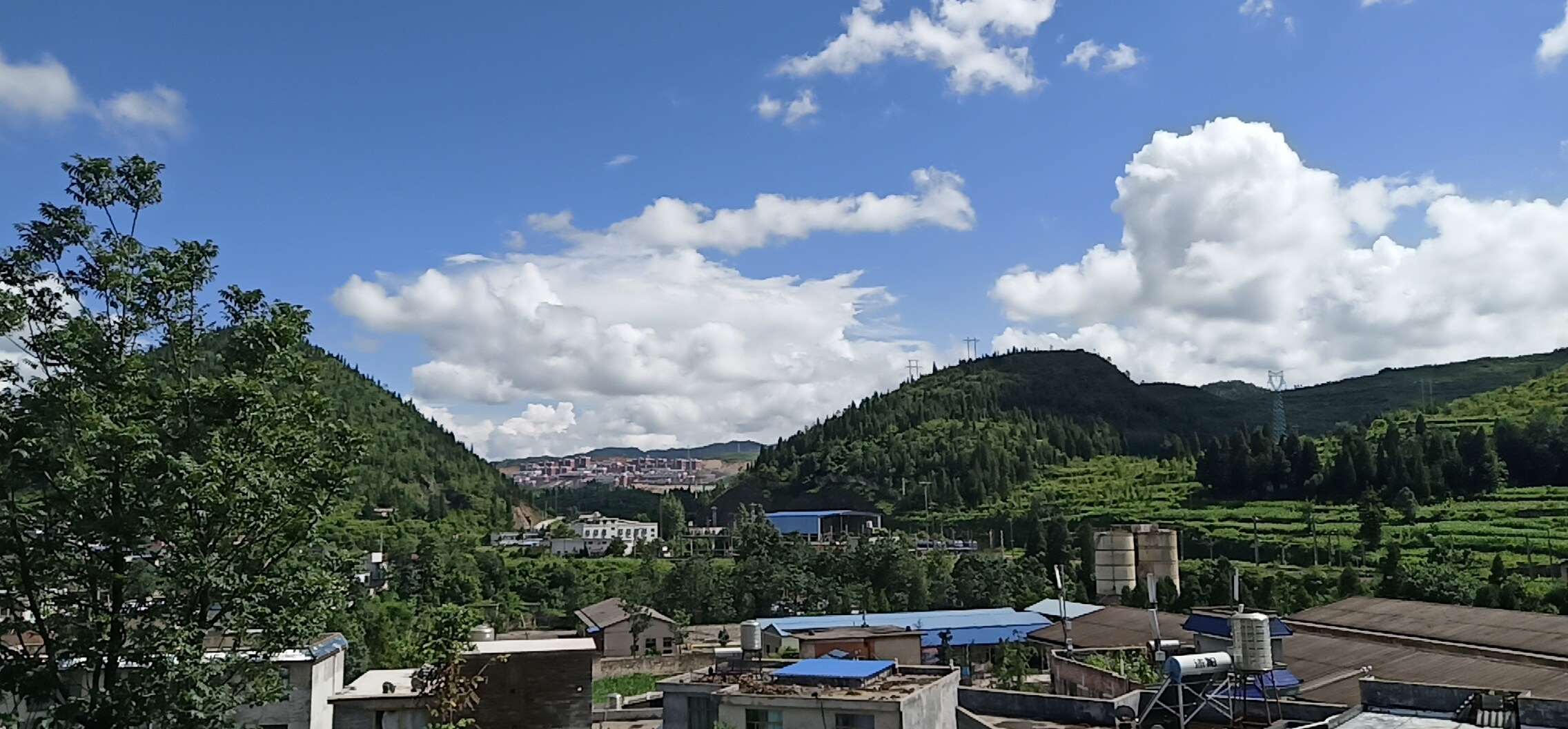
- Mountains in Pingchuan Community, Hongguo Subdistrict.
- Interactive map of Hongguo Subdistrict
- Coordinates: 25°42′52″N 104°27′56″E
- Country: People's Republic of China
- Province: Guizhou
- Prefecture-level city: Liupanshui
- County-level city: Panzhou

Area
  - Total: 271.88 km^{2} (104.97 sq mi)

Population (2015)
  - Total: 130,000
  - Density: 480/km^{2} (1,200/sq mi)
- Time zone: UTC+08:00 (China Standard)
- Postal code: 561601
- Area code: 0858

Chinese name
- Simplified Chinese: 红果街道
- Traditional Chinese: 紅果街道
Transcriptions
Standard Mandarin
- Hanyu Pinyin: Hóngguǒ Jiēdào

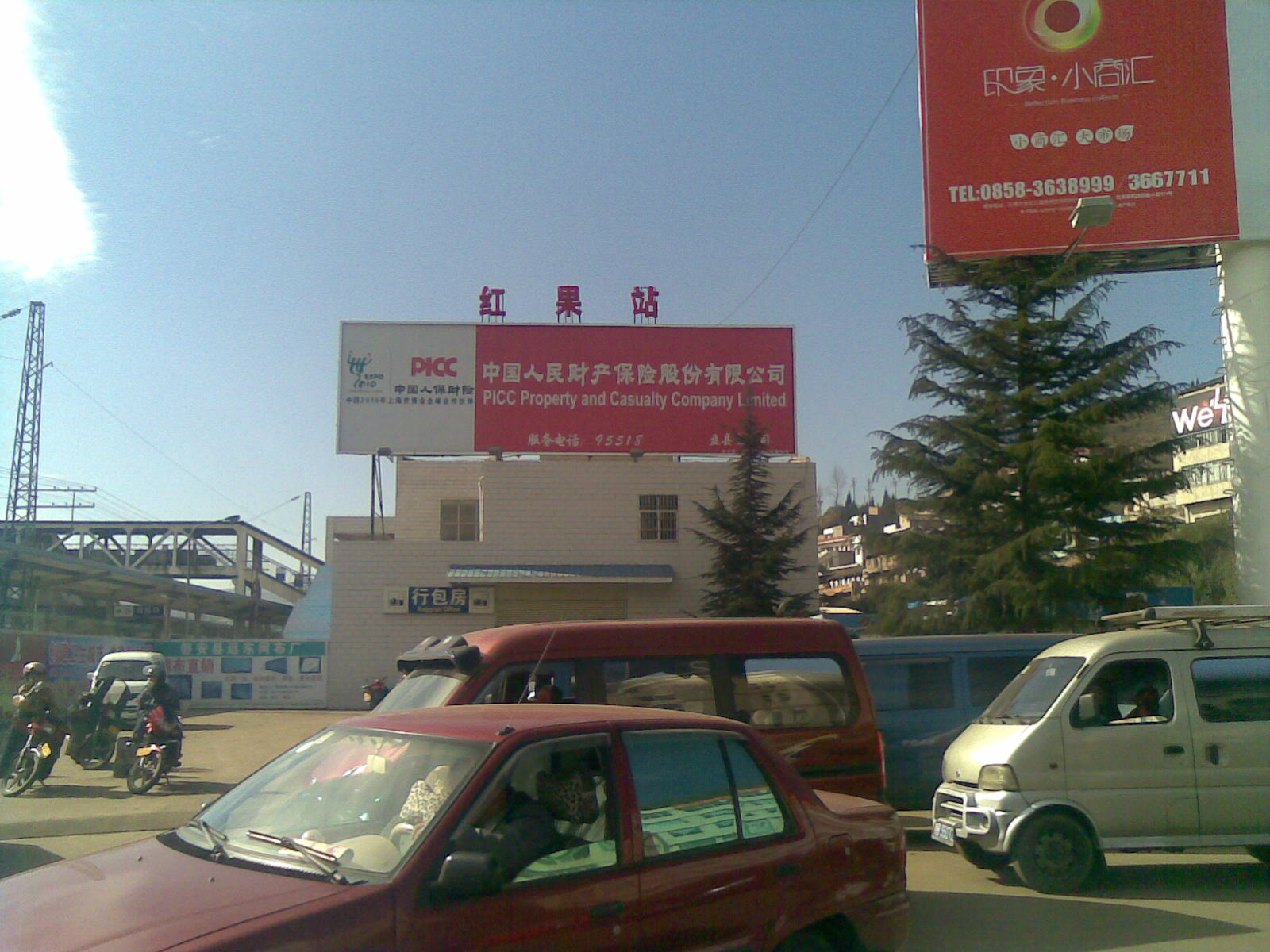
Hongguo railway station.

Hongguo Subdistrict (Chinese: 红果街道) is a subdistrict in Panzhou, Guizhou, China. As of the 2015 census it had a population of 130,000 and an area of 271.88-square-kilometre (104.97 sq mi).

== History ==
On June 4, 2015, former Hongguo Town was upgraded to a subdistrict.

== Administrative division ==
As of December 2015, the subdistrict is divided into 6 villages and 2 communities:

- Yueliangshan Community (月亮山社区)
- Pingchuan Community (平川社区)
- Nuowan (挪湾村)
- Zhichang (纸厂村)
- Huajiazhuang (花家庄村)
- Zhongsha (中沙村)
- Shele (舍勒村)
- Xiasha (下沙村)

== Economy ==
Hongguo Subdistrict's economy is based on nearby coal reserves and commerce.

== Transport ==
The town is connected to 4 highways and roads: Zhen-Sheng Expressway (镇胜高速公路), G320 National Highway (320国道), Wei-Hong Road (威红高等级公路) and Bai-Huo Road (柏火高等级公路).

The Hongguo railway station serves the town.

== See also ==
- List of township-level divisions of Guizhou
