= Vajrapani =

Deity in Buddhism

Vajrapāṇi
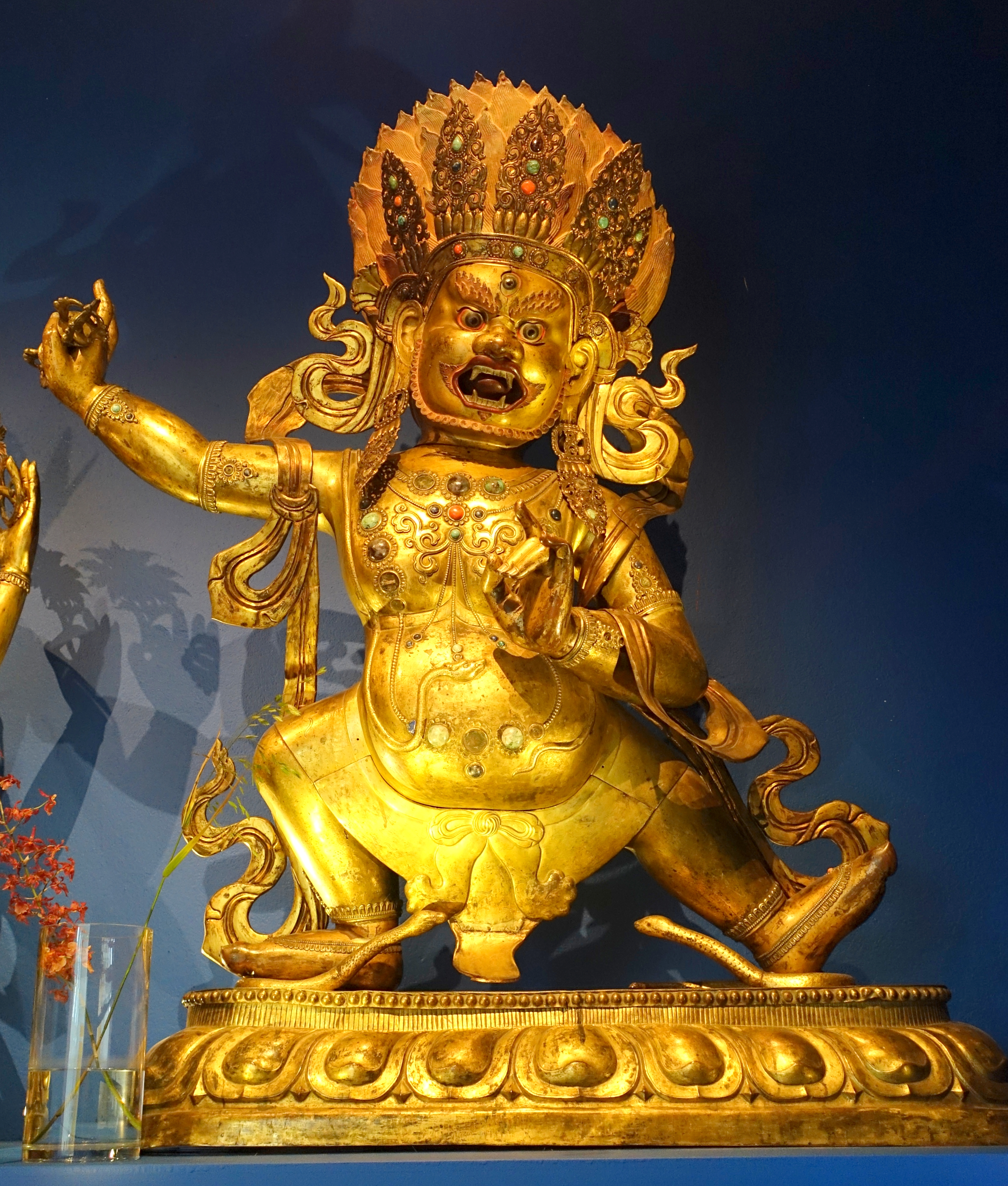
- Vajrapāṇi from Rig Sum Gonpo (Lords of the Three Families), collected by Sven Hedin in 1930, Efi Khalkha Temple, Chahar, Inner Mongolia. Housed in the Museum of Far Eastern Antiquities, Stockholm.
- Sanskrit: वज्रपाणि Vajrapāṇi
- Pāli: वजिरपाणि Vajirapāṇi
- Chinese: 金剛手菩薩 (Pinyin: Jīngāngshǒu Púsà)
- Japanese: 金剛手菩薩(こんごうしゅぼさつ) (romaji: Kongōshu Bosatsu)
- Khmer: វជ្របាណិ (vach-cheak-baa)
- Korean: 금강수보살 (RR: Geumgangsu Bosal)
- Mongolian: ᠸᠴᠢᠷᠸᠠᠨᠢ; Очирваань; SASM/GNC: Wčirwani
- Sinhala: වජ්‍රපාණි (Vajrapani)
- Tagalog: Baklapani
- Thai: พระวัชรปาณีโพธิสัตว์ (Phra Watcharapani Phothisat)
- Tibetan: ཕྱག་ན་རྡོ་རྗེ་ Wylie: phyag na rdo rje THL: chak na dorje
- Vietnamese: Kim Cương Thủ Bồ Tát

Information
- Venerated by: Theravada, Mahayana, Vajrayana

Vajrapāṇi (Sanskrit; Pali: Vajirapāṇi, 'holder of the thunderbolt', lit. meaning, "Vajra in [his] hand") is one of the earliest-appearing bodhisattvas in Mahayana Buddhism. He is the protector and guide of Gautama Buddha and rose to symbolize the Buddha's power.

Vajrapāni is also called Chana Dorje and Chador and extensively represented in Buddhist iconography as one of the earliest three protective deities or bodhisattvas surrounding the Buddha. Each of them symbolizes one of the Buddha's virtues: Manjushri manifests all the Buddhas' wisdom, Avalokiteśvara manifests all the Buddhas' immense compassion, and Vajrapāni protects Buddha and manifests all the Buddhas' power as well as the power of all five tathāgatas (Buddhahood of the rank of Buddha).

Vajrapāni is one of the earliest Dharmapalas of Mahayana Buddhism and also appears as a deity in the Pali Canon of the Theravada school. He is worshiped in the Shaolin Monastery, in Tibetan Buddhism and in Pure Land Buddhism (where he is known as Mahasthamaprapta and forms a triad with Amitābha and Avalokiteśvara). Manifestations of Vajrapāni can also be found in many Buddhist temples in China, Taiwan and Japan as Dharma protectors guarding monastery and temple gates. Vajrapāni is also associated with Acala, where he is serenaded as the holder of the vajra.

== Etymology ==
Vajrapāni, "holder of the thunderbolt", is a compound word in Sanskrit in which 'Vajra' means "Diamond or Thunderbolt", and 'pāni' literally means "in hand".

== Forms ==
In human form Vajrapāni is depicted holding the vajra in his right hand. He is sometimes referred to as a Dhyani-Bodhisattva, equivalent to Akshobhya, the second Dhyani Buddha. Acharya-Vajrapani is Vajrapani's manifestation as Dharmapala, often seen sporting a third eye, ghanta (bell) and pāśa (lasso). He is sometimes represented as a yidam with one head and four hands in a form known as Nilambara-Vajrapani, carrying a vajra, and treading on personage lying on snakes. Mahacakra-Vajrapani, also a yidam, is depicted with three heads and six arms, carrying a vajra and snakes whilst treading on Brahmā and Indra. He is often in union with his consort in yab-yum. Acala-Vajrapani is depicted with four heads, four arms and four legs carrying a sword, a lasso and vajra, treading on demons. Another depiction is in the form with the head, wings, and claws of Garuda.

Vajrapāni's expression is wrathful, and is often symbolised as a yaksha, to generate "fear in the individual to loosen up his dogmatism." His outstretched right hand brandishes a vajra, "symbolising analytical knowledge (jñanavajra) that disintegrates the grasping of consciousness. Although he sometimes wears a skull crown, in most depictions he wears a five-pointed bodhisattva crown to depict the power of the five Dhyani Buddhas (the fully awakened state of the Buddha).

== Mantras ==
The mantra Oṃ Vajrapāṇi Hūṃ Phaṭ is associated with Vajrapāni. His Seed Syllable is hūṃ.

- Tibetan: ༄༅།། ཨོཾ་བཛྲ་པཱ་ཎི་ཧཱུྃ་ཕཊ།།
- ཨོཾ་བཛྲ་ཙཎྜ་སརྦ་དུཥྚཱཾ་ཏ་ཀ་ཧ་ན་ད་ཧ་པ་ཙ་ཧཱུྃ་ཕཊ། Oṃ vajracaṇḍa sarvaduṣṭāntaka hana daha paca hūṃ phaṭ

== Legends ==
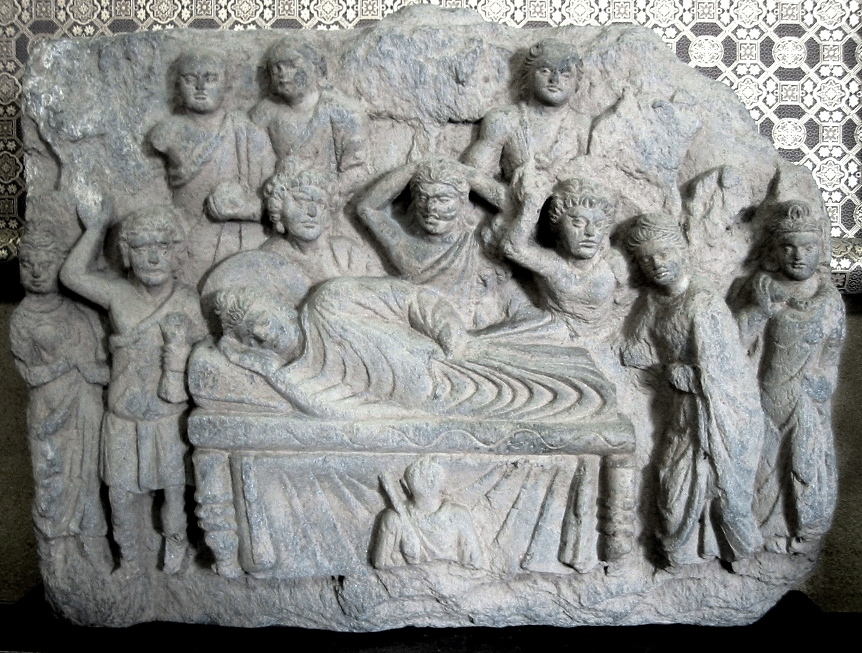
Parinirvana of Buddha

In early Buddhist legends, Vajrapāni is a minor deity who accompanied Gautama Buddha during his career as a wandering mendicant. In some texts, he is stated to be manifestation of Śakra, king of the Trāyastriṃśa heaven of Buddhist and Hindu cosmology. As Śakra, it is said that he was present during the birth of Tathagata. As Vajrapāni he was the god who helped Gautama escape from the palace at the time of his renunciation. When Sakyamuni returned from Kapilavastu he is stated to have assumed eight forms of devas who escorted him.

According to Xuanzang, the Chinese monk and traveler, Vajrapāni vanquished a large serpent at Udyana. In another version it is stated that while the Nāgas came to worship the Buddha and hear his sermons, Vajrapāni assumed the form of a bird to deceive them so that they were not attacked by their deadly enemies, the Garudas.

At the parinirvana of the Buddha, Vajrapāni dropped his vajra in despair and rolled himself in the dust.

== Meaning ==
Vajrapāni is seen as a manifestation of Vajradhara and the "spiritual reflex", the Dhyani Bodhisattva of Akshobhya. On the popular level, Vajrapāni is the bodhisattva who represents the power of all the buddhas just as Avalokiteśvara represents their great compassion, and Mañjuśrī their wisdom. He is called the Master of Unfathomable Mysteries who upholds truth even in adversities of darkness and ignorance.

According to the Pañcaviṃsatisāhasrikā- and Aṣṭasāhasrikāprajñāpāramitās, any bodhisattva on the path to buddhahood is eligible for Vajrapāni's protection, making them invincible to any attacks "by either men or ghosts".

== Features and identifications ==
=== Identification with Heracles ===
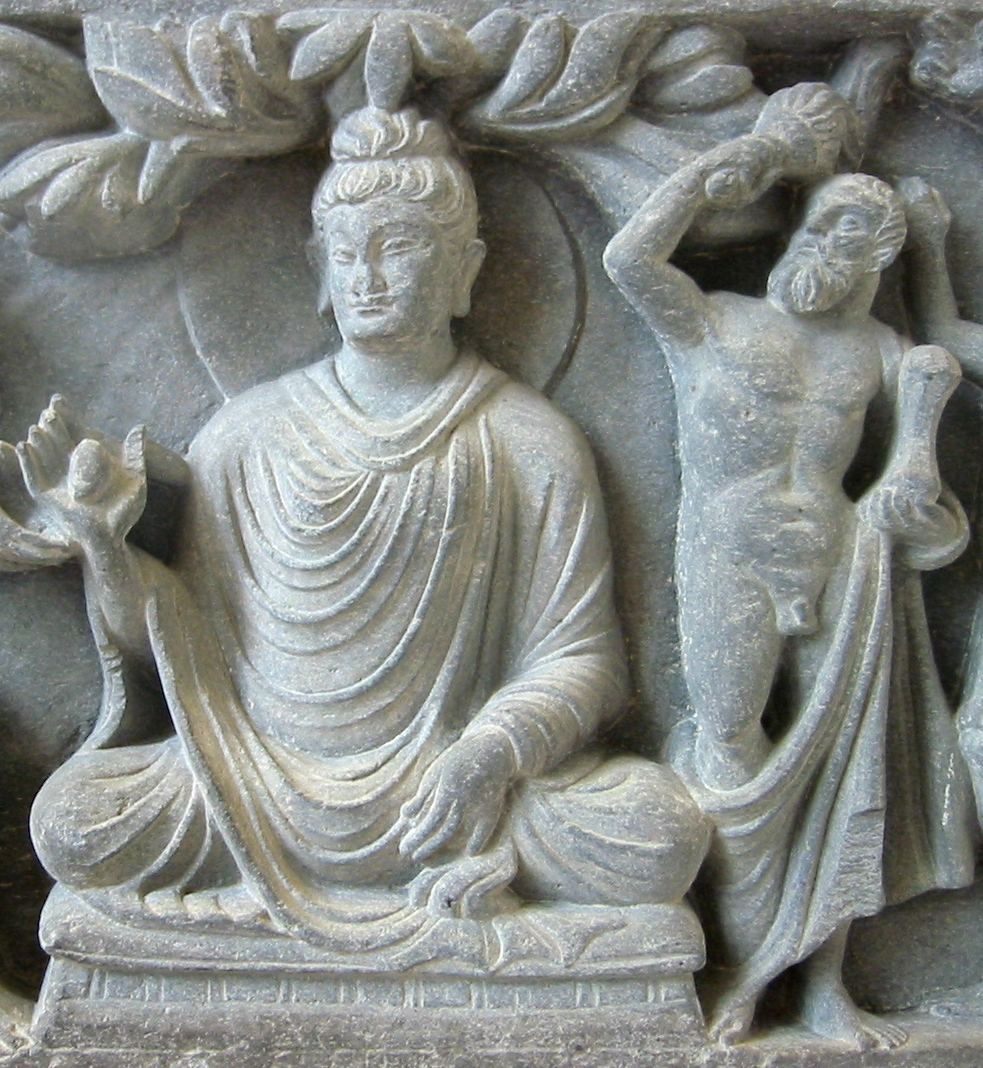
Vajrapāni as Heracles or Zeus, second century

As Buddhism expanded in Central Asia and fused with Hellenistic influences into Greco-Buddhism, the Greek hero Heracles was adopted to represent Vajrapāni. In that era, he was typically depicted as a hairy, muscular athlete, wielding a short "diamond" club. Buddhaghosa associated Vajrapāni with the deva king Indra. Some authors believe that the deity depicted is actually Zeus, whose Classical attribute is the thunderbolt. The image of Vajrapani as a wrestler-like figure would eventually influence the statues of guardian deities in East Asia.

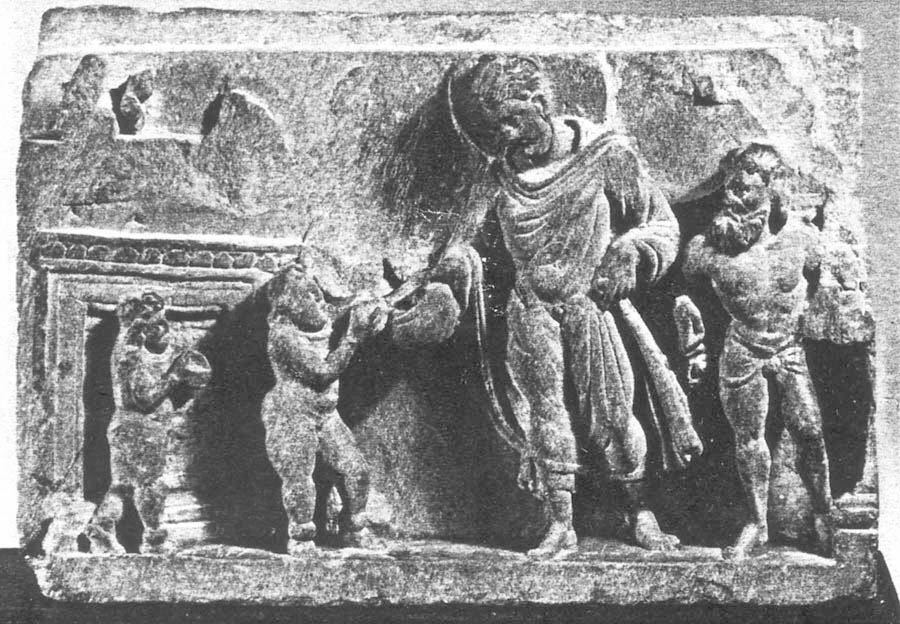
Vajrapani, protector of the Buddha

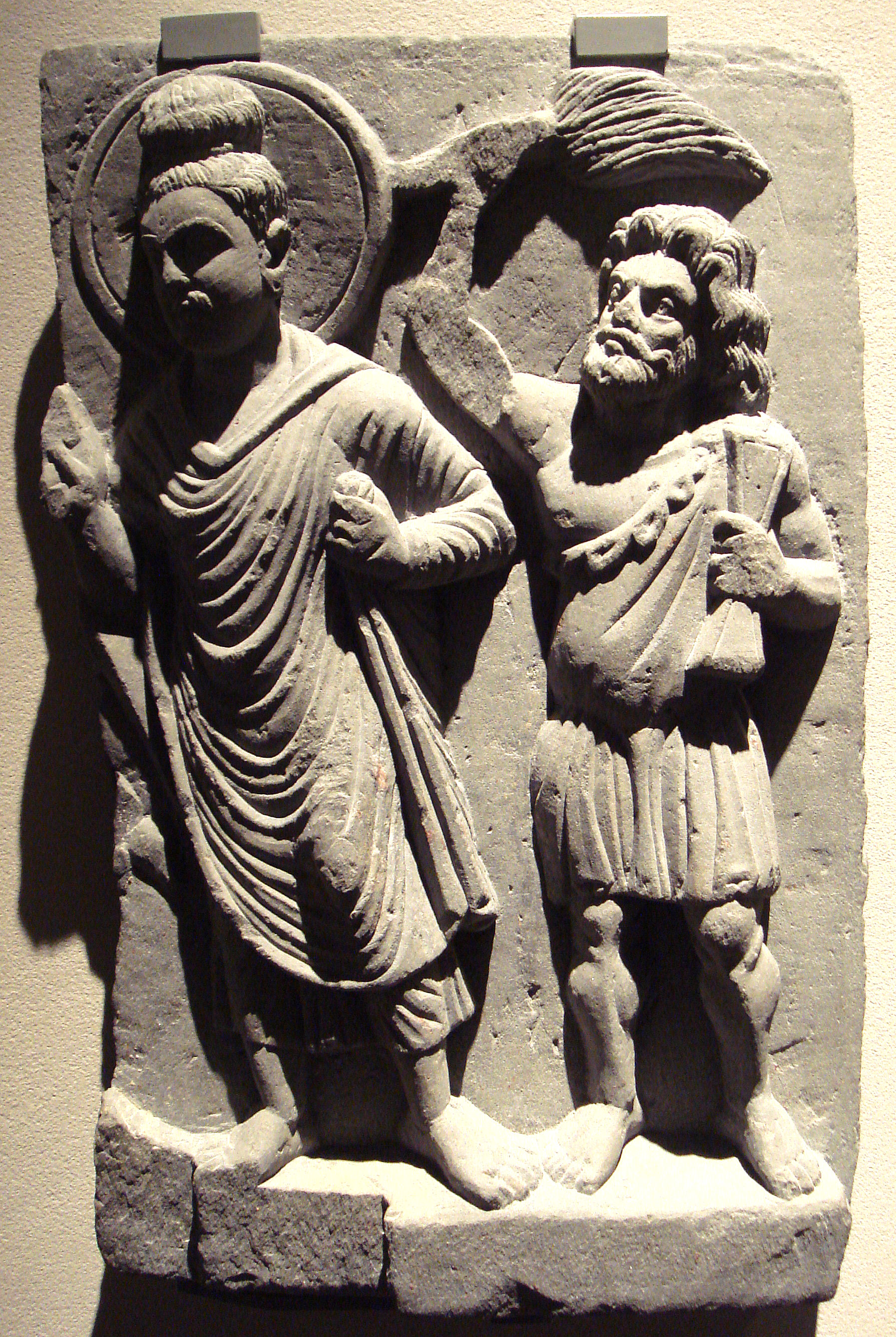
The Buddha with his protector Vajrapāni. Gandhara, 2nd century

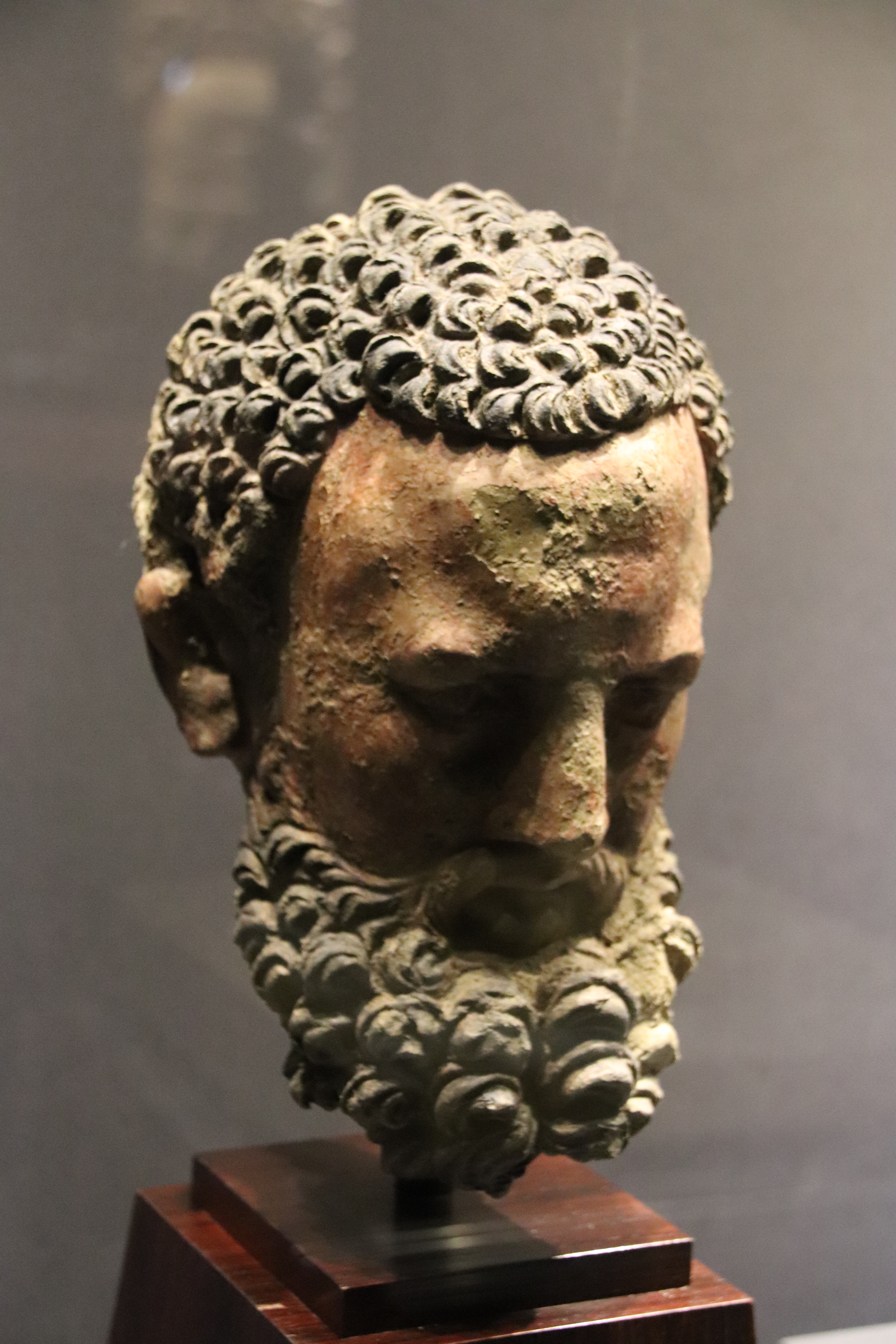
Vajrapani, 3–4th century

=== In India ===
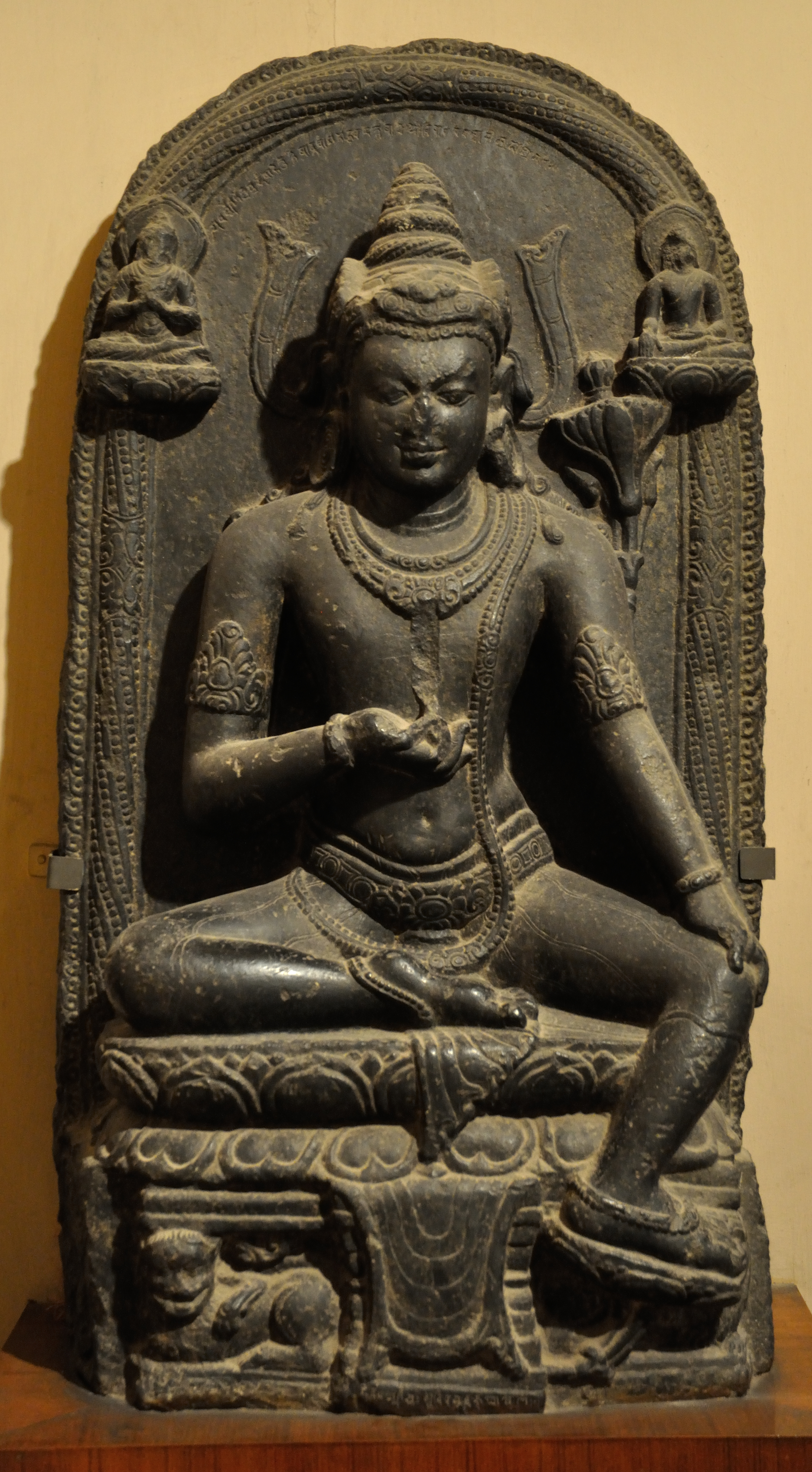
Vajrapani - Circa 9th century AD - Bihar

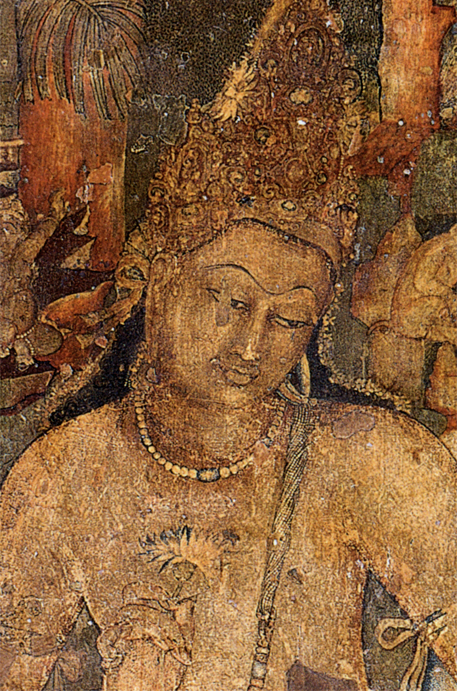
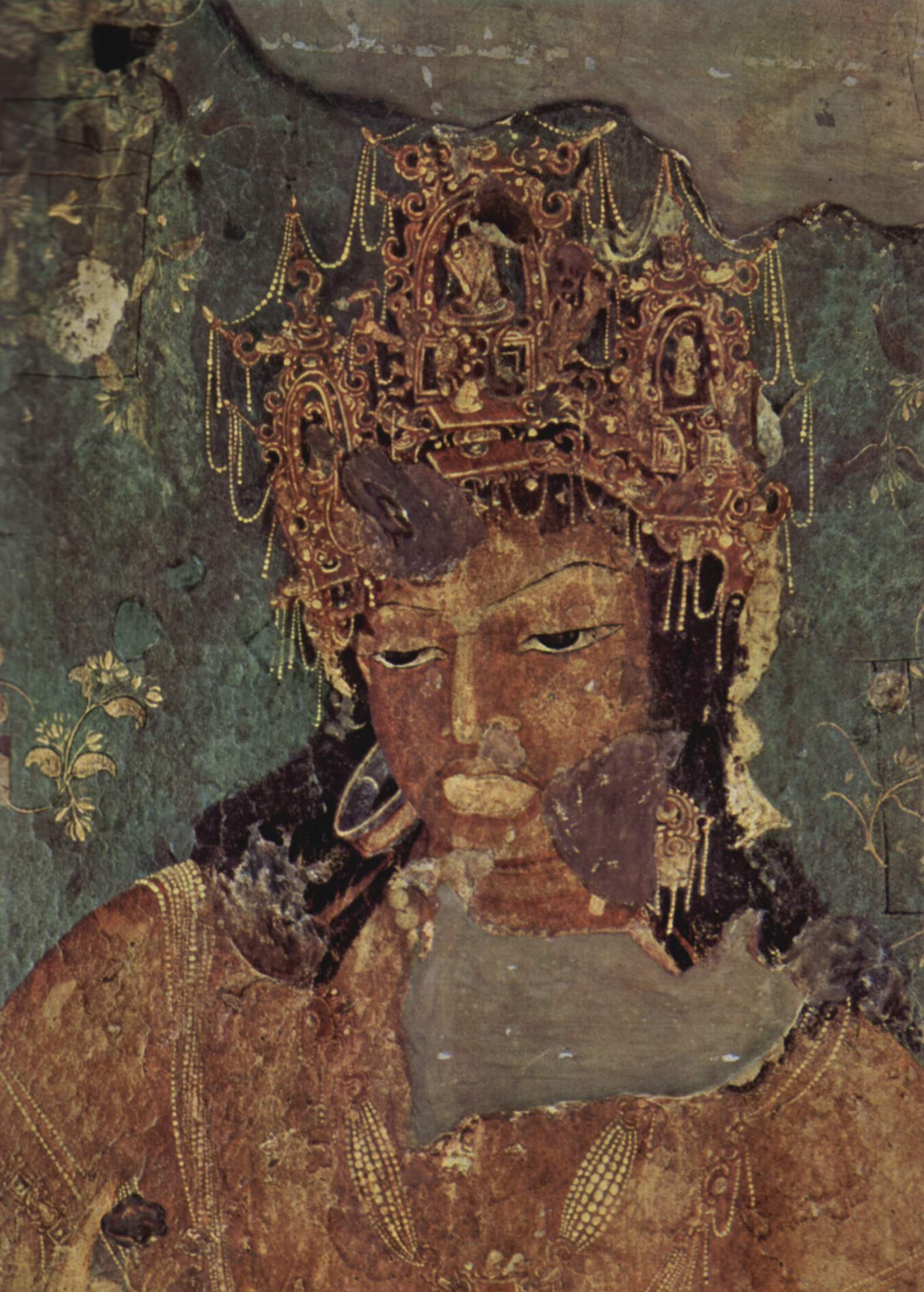
Paintings of Avalokiteshvara or Padmapani and Vajrapani on either side of the Buddha, from cave 1 of the Ajanta Caves

During the Kushan Empire, Gandhara art depicted Vajrapani's images in which he is shown primarily as a protector of Sakyamuni and not in the role of a bodhisattva. In the Indrasalaguha scenes, mountains form a part of his environment where his presence during the conversion of the naga Apalala is shown. In these depictions, he is shown wearing exclusive Western attire and always in the presence of other deities. The reliefs in this art form depict Vajrapani always present in the scenes where Buddha is converting people; his presence is shown when the Buddha confronts the opponents of the dharma like Mara before his enlightenment. Scenes of Sakyamuni competing with the heretics are also part of this art tradition. Scenes of Buddha using the vajra of Vajrapani as the "magic weapon" to perform miracles and propagate "superiority of his doctrine" are also common.

In the western group of caves of the Ajanta Caves in Aurangabad, Vajrapani is depicted as a bodhisattva with his vajra in a tableau, a votive panel of sculptural composition in which he in a standing posture (the only extant figure) over a lotus to the left of a Buddha in a dhyanasana. In this panel he is adorned with a tall crown, two necklaces, a snake armlet and holds the vajra in his left hand, and resting on a scarf tied across his hips. This close iconographic composition is at the entrance to the porch of cave 2 and in the incomplete porch of cave 1. Such votive carved panels with Vajrapani are also seen in the interior of the parikrama passage of cave 2, in which he is paired with other bodhisattvas like Avalokiteśvara. In this panel he has a crown in the form of a stupa with a scarf fastened over his left thigh.

In the eastern group of caves, at the entry to cave 6, Vajrapani is carved as a commanding persona in the form of a huge dvarapala, along with Avalokiteśvara. Here, he is flanked by a small attendant. He carries the *vajra*, a luminous weapon in his left hand, which rests on a scarf tied across his hip. His right arm is bent forward, and possibly once held a lotus, similar to Avalokiteśvara. Both figures at the entrance of cave 6 are depicted wearing crowns (makuṭa).

=== In China ===
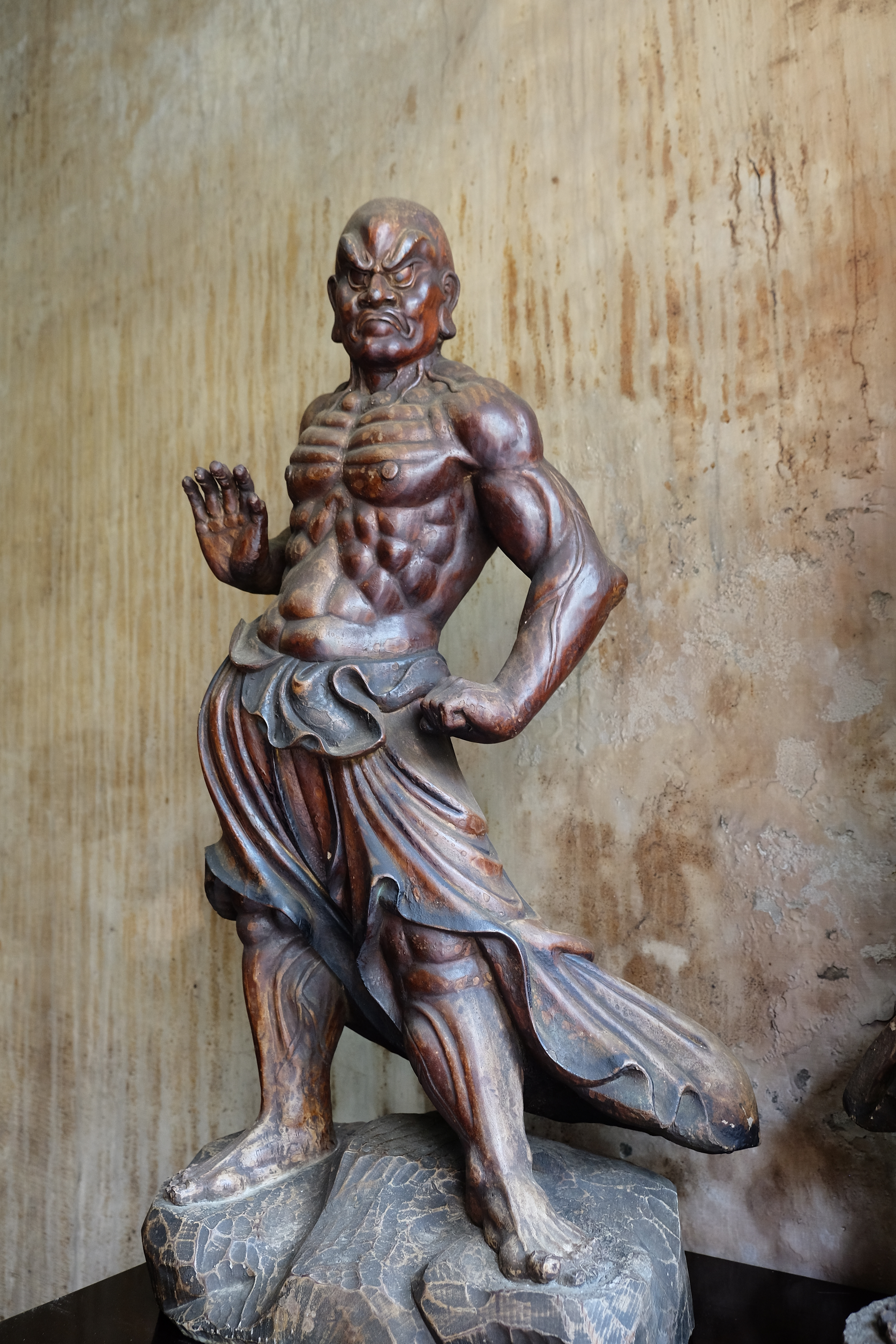
General Heng in Dadaocheng Cisheng Temple, Taiwan

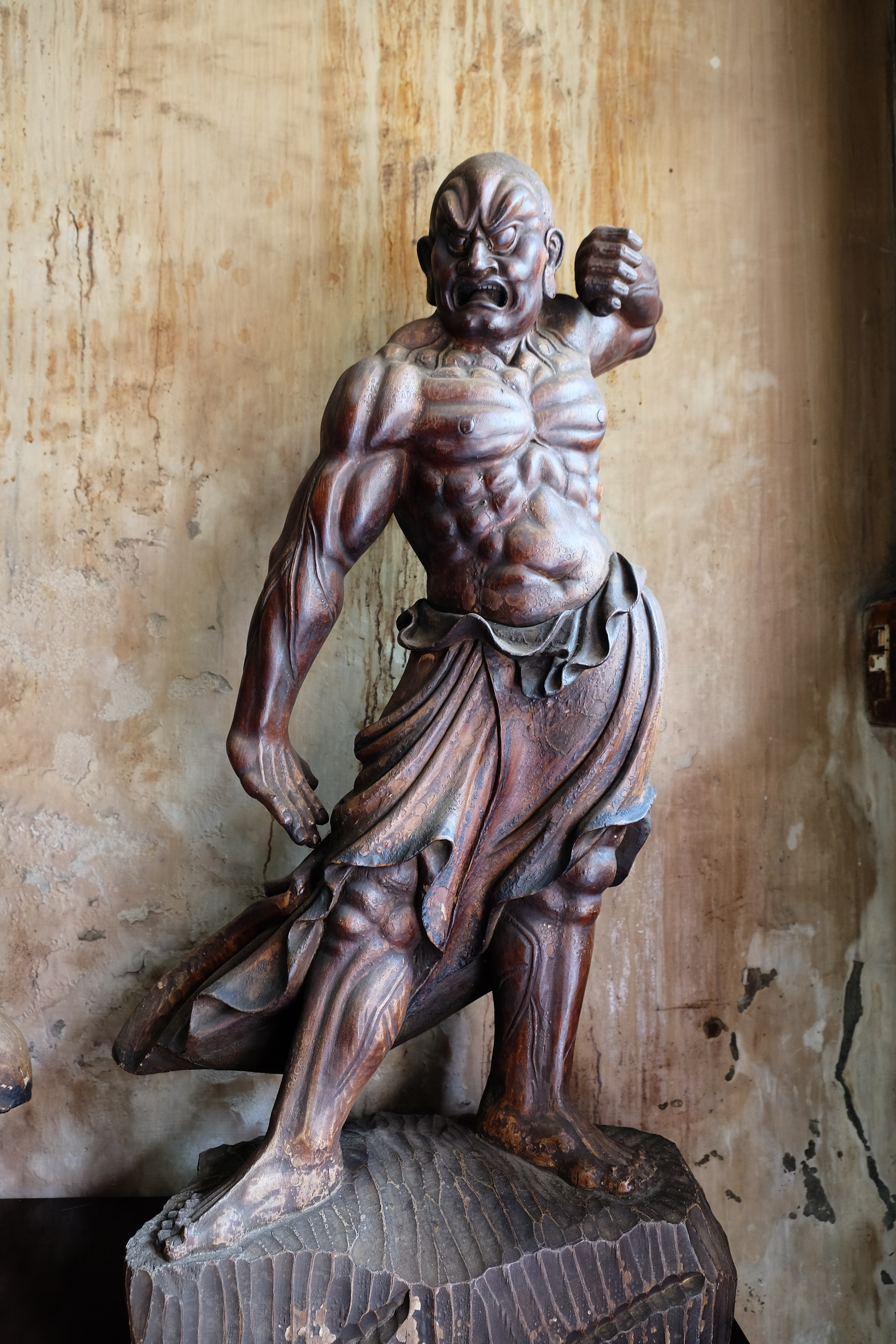
General Ha in Dadaocheng Cisheng Temple, Taiwan

In China, Vajrapāni, known as the "vajra-holding god" (執金剛神 Zhíjīngāng shén), is widely venerated in his dual manifestation as the "vajra warriors" (金剛力士 Jīngāng Lìshì) or "Benevolent Kings" (仁王 Rénwáng), two muscular guardian deities that usually stand at each side of the shanmen in Buddhist temples and monasteries. The statue on the right side is traditionally named "Guhyapāda" (密跡金剛 Mìjī jīngāng), while the one on the left is traditionally named "Nārāyaṇa" (那羅延天 Nàluóyán tiān), both of whom are dharmapalas in the Chinese Buddhist canon. In Chinese folk religion, they are also known as "Generals Heng and Ha" (哼哈二將 Hēnghā èrjiàng), so named because the right statue usually has its mouth open to pronounce the sound "a", while the other usually has it closed to utter the sound "heng". The two sounds are the start and end sounds in Sanskrit, symbolizing the basis of sounds and bearing the profound theory of Dharma. Guhyapāda, in particular, is also considered one of the Twenty Devas or Twenty-Four Devas in the Chinese Buddhist pantheon. In the Shaolin tradition, Vajrapāni is venerated as an avatar of Guanyin (Avalokiteśvara) who manifested to protect the monastery during the Yuan dynasty.

=== In Japan ===
In Japan, Vajrapāni is called Shukongōshin (執金剛神), the on'yomi reading of his Chinese name. As in China, his image was the inspiration for the Niō (仁王; Benevolent Kings), the wrath-filled and muscular guardian of the Buddha, found at the entrance of many Buddhist temples.

Vajrapāni is also associated with Acala (不動明王, Fudō-myōō); the mantra for Fudō-myōō references him as the powerful wielder of the vajra. Though he is not a very popular form of statue worship in Japan, he is frequently depicted in diagrams (mandala). The sixth formation of the Womb Realm Mandala is called the "Vajrapani enclosure", in which he is depicted in 20 different forms, with Vajrasattva as the presiding deity. In Japanese iconography he is depicted in red colour at the death of Buddha.

=== In Indonesia ===
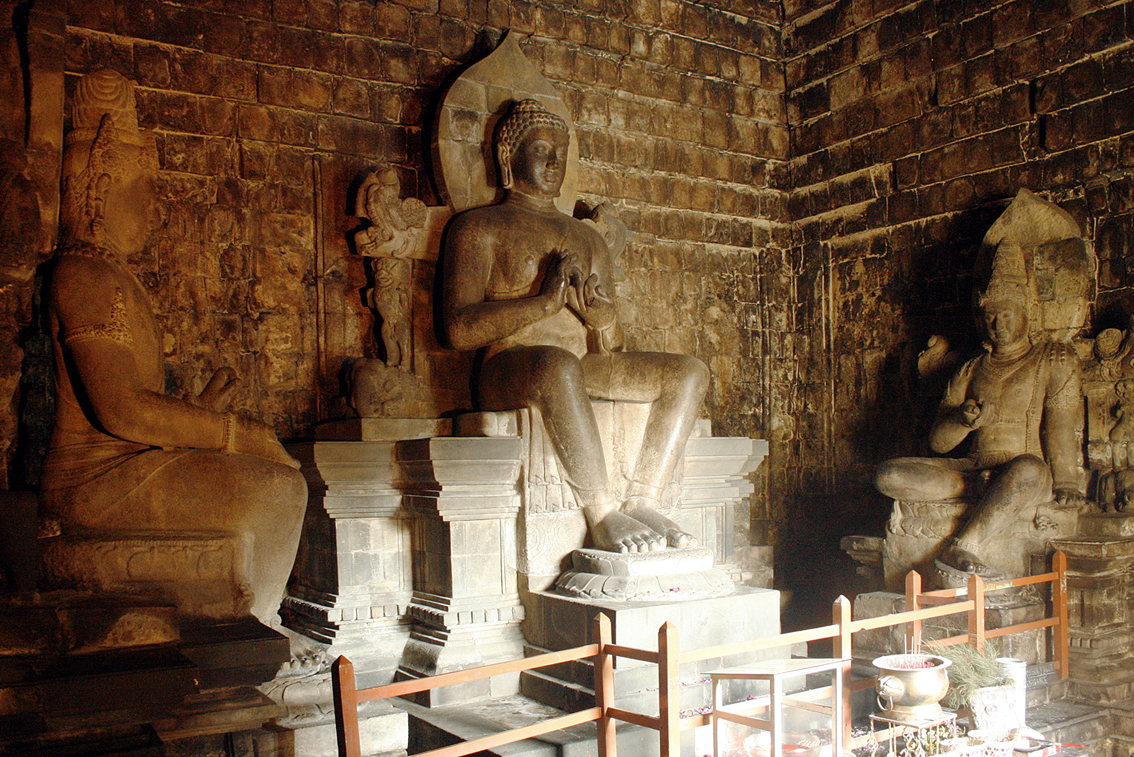
The Buddha Vairocana (center) flanked by Padmapani (left) and Vajrapāni (right). Mendut, 8th century

In Indonesia, Vajrapani is depicted as a part of triad with Vairocana and Padmapani. A famous 3 metres tall stone statues of Vairocana, Padmapani, and Vajrapāni triad can be found in central chamber of Mendut temple, located around 3 kilometres east from Borobudur, Central Java. Both seated Padmapani and Vajrapani, regarded as the guardian of Buddha Vairocana, are depicted as a handsome well-built men with serene expression adorned with exquisite crown and jewelries. The statues are the fine example of the 9th century Central Javanese Sailendran art, which influenced the Buddhist art in Southeast Asia, including Srivijayan art of Sumatra and Malay Peninsula (Southern Thailand).

=== In Cambodia ===
In Cambodia, three monasteries dated to 953 AD are dedicated to the worship of the triad of the Buddha—Prajnaparamita and Vajrapani; image of Vajrapani with four arms is venerated in one of these monasteries. Also, in niches are standing images of Vajrapani carved with four or two arms on each of the four faces of monoliths found in Western Cambodia.

=== In Nepal ===
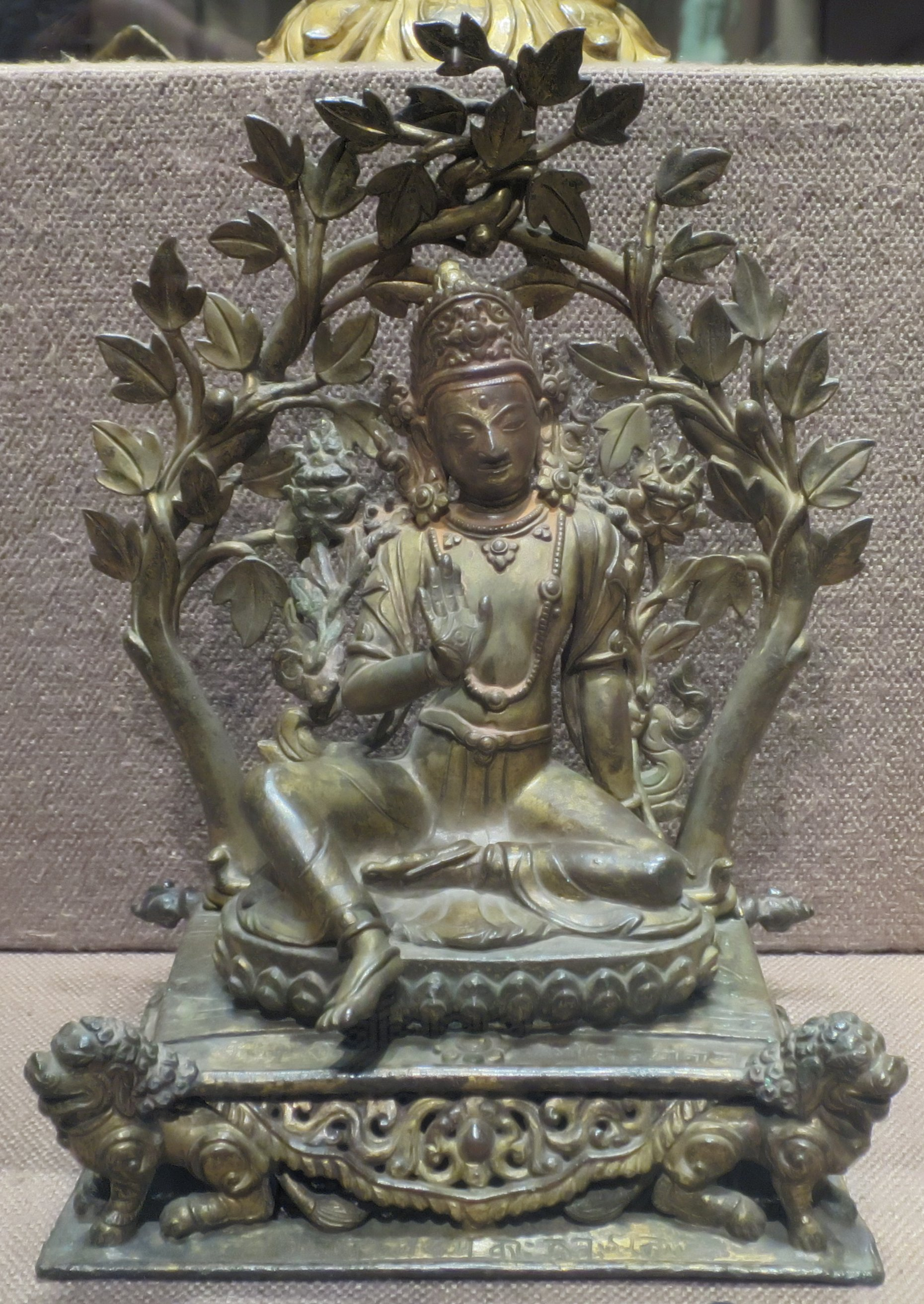
Bronze image Bodhisattva Vajrapani from Nepal, 1731

In Nepal, Vajrapani is depicted holding a vajra supported on a lotus with its stem held in the right hand while the left hand is shown in a posture of "charity and argument". His paintings are in white colour.

=== In Tibet ===
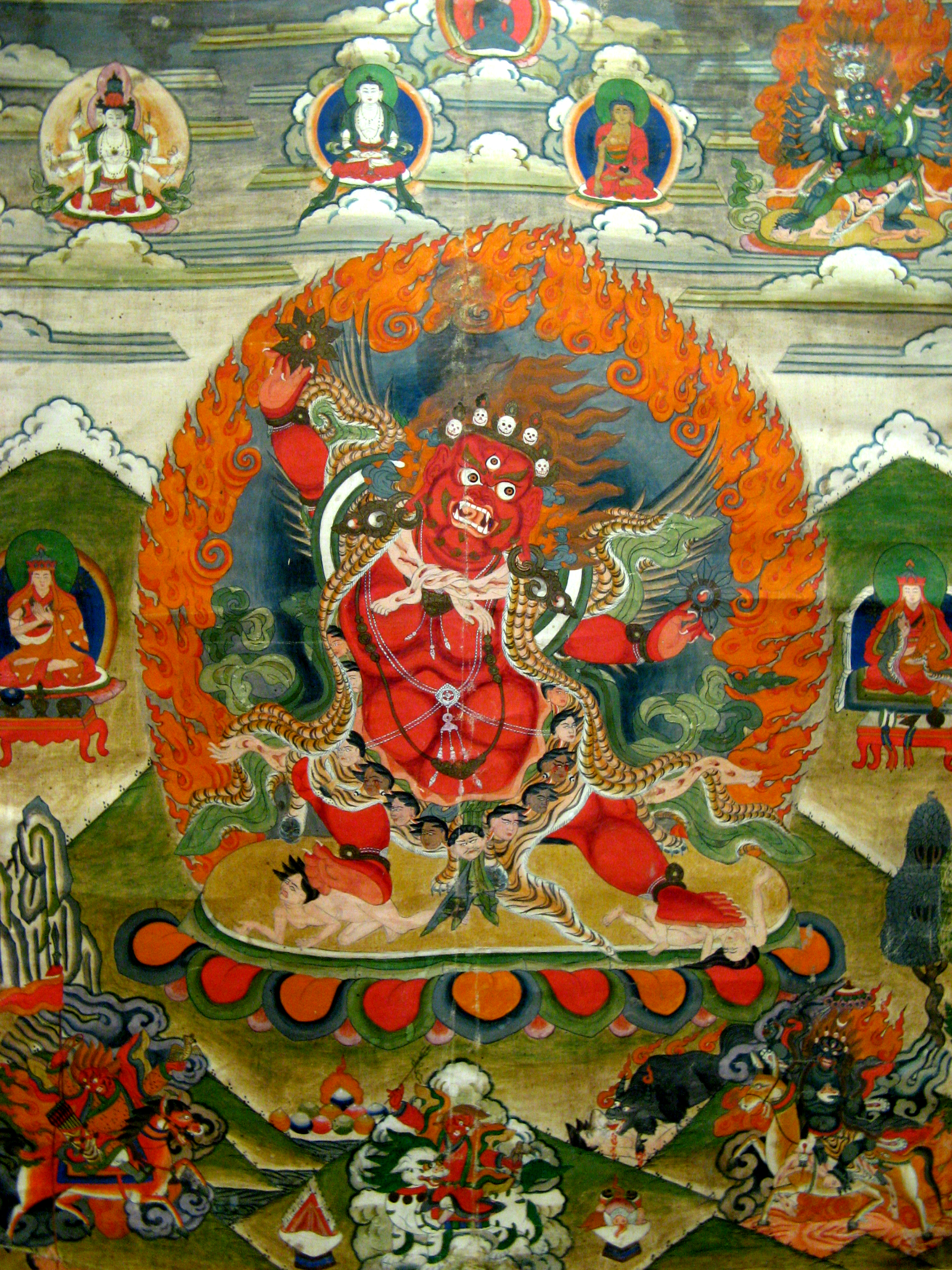
Thangka of a Dharmapala

In Tibet, Vajrapani is represented in many fierce forms. Some of the notable ones are: Vajrapani-Acharya (Dharmapala) in a human form with only one head with a third eye with hair raised and crowned by a skull with fiery expression. His neck is adorned with a necklace of snakes, and with waist band made of tiger skin covered with skulls. Stepping to the right, his lifted hand holds a vajra. When painted in blue colour the image is encircled by flames with images of small Garudas; Nilambara-Vajrapani with one head, with a third eye, a crown made of skull with four or six arms and in some cases with untidy hair bedecked with vajra and snake. Two hands are crossed to the breast in mystic posture (mudra), the second right hand is lifted up and carries a vajra. Stepping to the right, regally crowned and lying over a bed of snakes; in Achala-Vajrapani form he is shown with four heads, four arms and four legs adorned with symbols of vajra, sword, lasso and skull cup (kapala) and trampling over demons; Mahachakra-Vajrapani is a form with three heads and a third eye, and with six arms and two legs. The icon is adorned with symbols of vajra, snake with yum held in its main hands, and as shakti it to his left is shown holding a skull-cup (kapala) and a chopper or hooked knife (kartika). The icon is shown stepping over Brahma on the right and on Indra to the left; in the Thunderbolt-Wielder form known as "snake charm form" to protect from snake bites, he is depicted sitting on a lotus throne carried by peacocks. The right hand posture holds one end of rope noose to capture snake demons while the left hand held over the hips carries the other end of the noose. He is followed by two bodhisattvas—"Sarvanivarana-Vishkambhin, Effacer of Stains, and Samantabhadra, the Entirely Virtuous One". His adornments consist of a tall crown and snakes coiling his arms and ankles. In a painted form, usually in white colour "crossed-vajra" is held to the left raised above the accompanying Bodhisattvas but when painted in blue colour the left hand holds a double vajra; his Garuda form is with wings and claws or with human head with a beak or head with wings fully spread (his painted form is in blue colour). he may be trampling over a demon or dead naga (snake). In some images he is shown carrying a sword, a bottle in the shape of a gourd, a chopper or hands held in a prayer mode.

=== In Vietnam ===
In Vietnamese Buddhism, Vajrapani is considered the Dharma and is said to have eight Vajrapani, called Bát bộ kim cương. Sùng Thiện Diên Linh stele (built 1122) in Long Đọi Temple from the Lý dynasty mentioned eight. These eight Dharma protectors are often arranged in Vietnamese Buddhist temples as to protect the Dharma, followers and Buddhist worship facilities. The eight Dharma protectors have their own names:

- Thanh Trừ Tai
- Tích Độc Thần
- Hoàng Tùy Cầu
- Bạch Tịnh Thủy
- Xích Thanh Hỏa
- Định Trừ Tai
- Tử Hiền Thần
- Đại Thần Lực

Although they are eight, all eight are gathered into a unified group, divided into two rows, four in each row, not separated to worship.

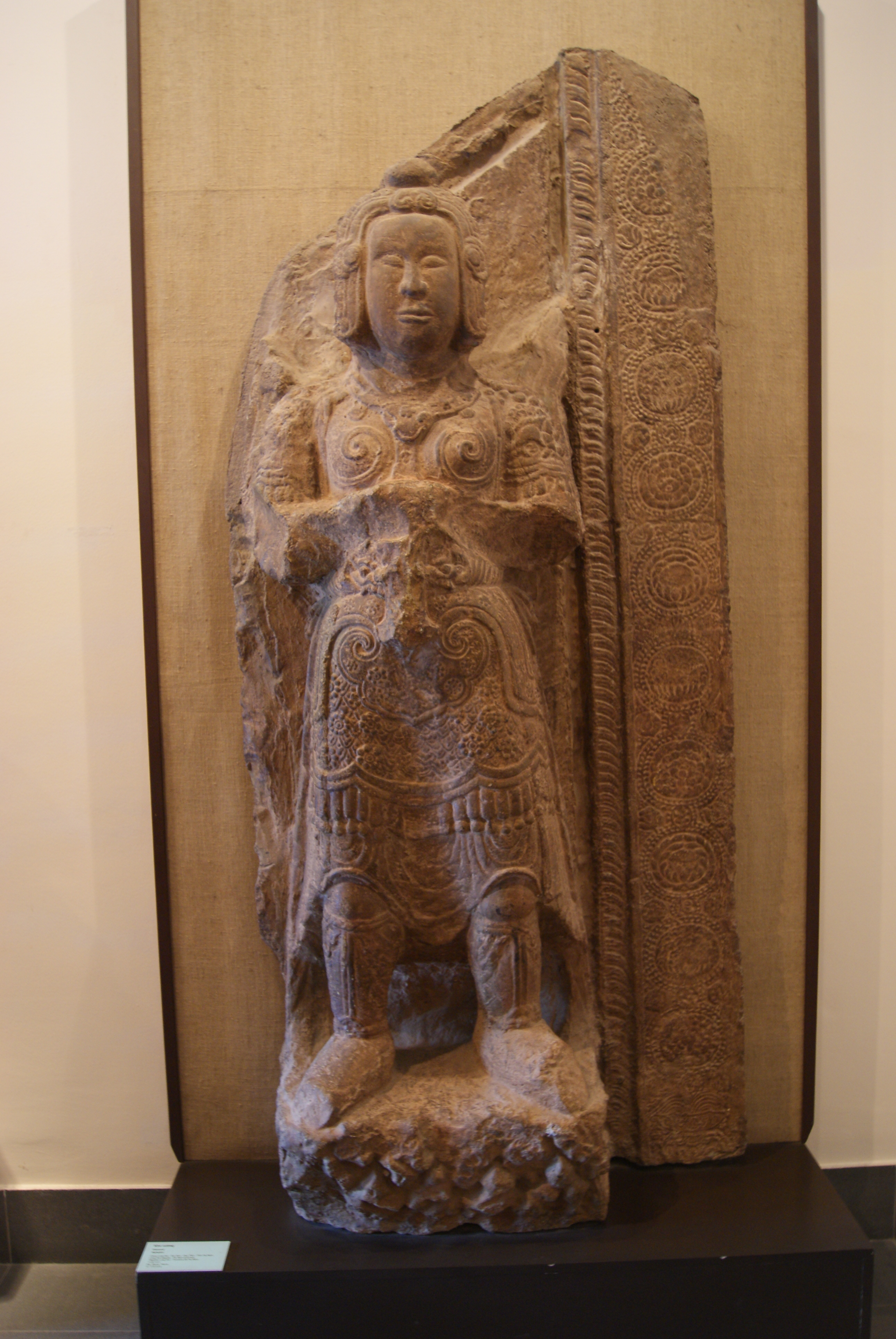
Statue of Vajrapāṇi, Long Đọi Temple, Hà Nam Province (1118–1121, Trần dynasty)

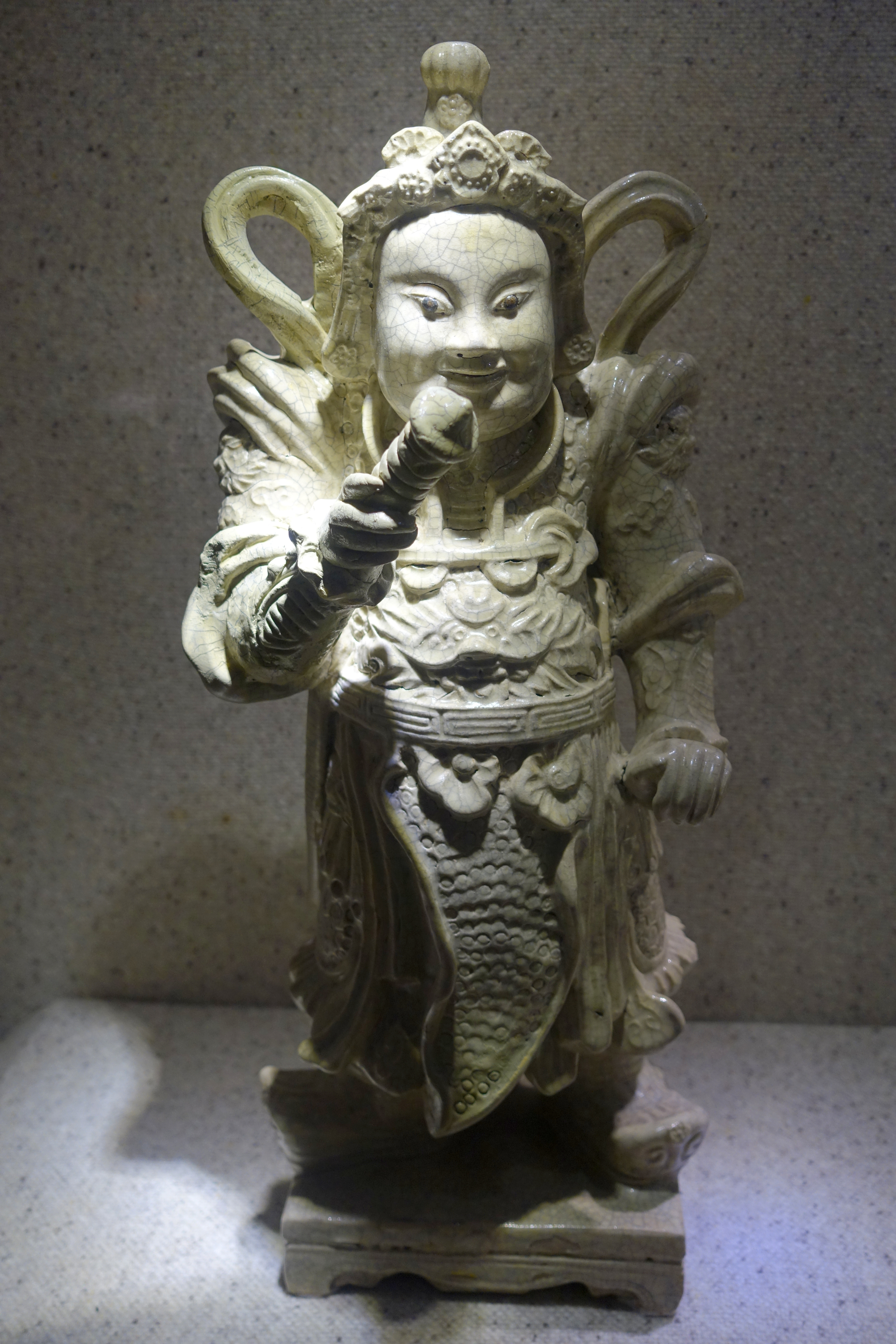
Vajrapāni figurine, Bát Tràng kiln, Hanoi, Revival Lê dynasty, 17th century AD

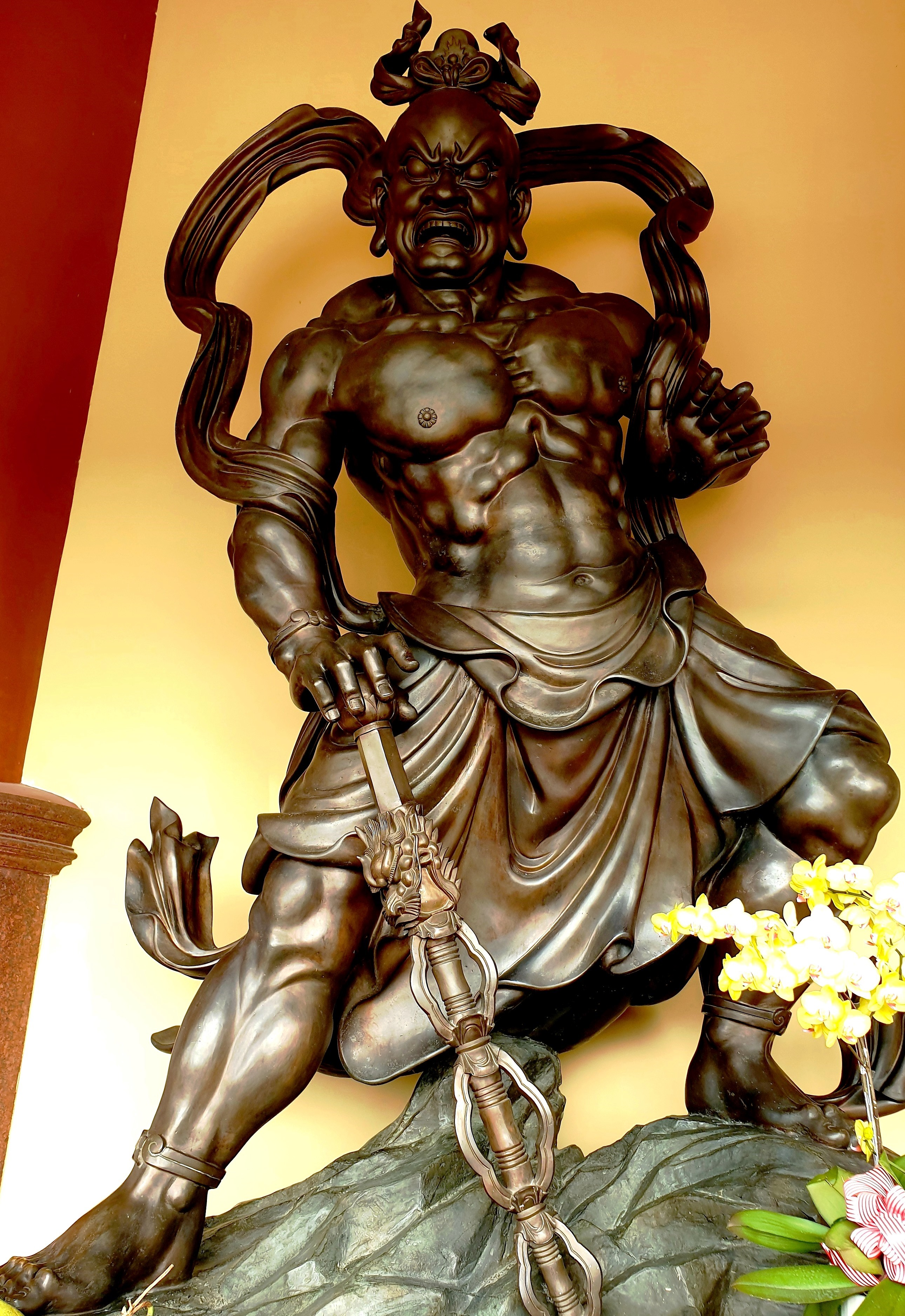
Two out of eight Bát bộ kim cang statues at Phật Cô Đơn temple

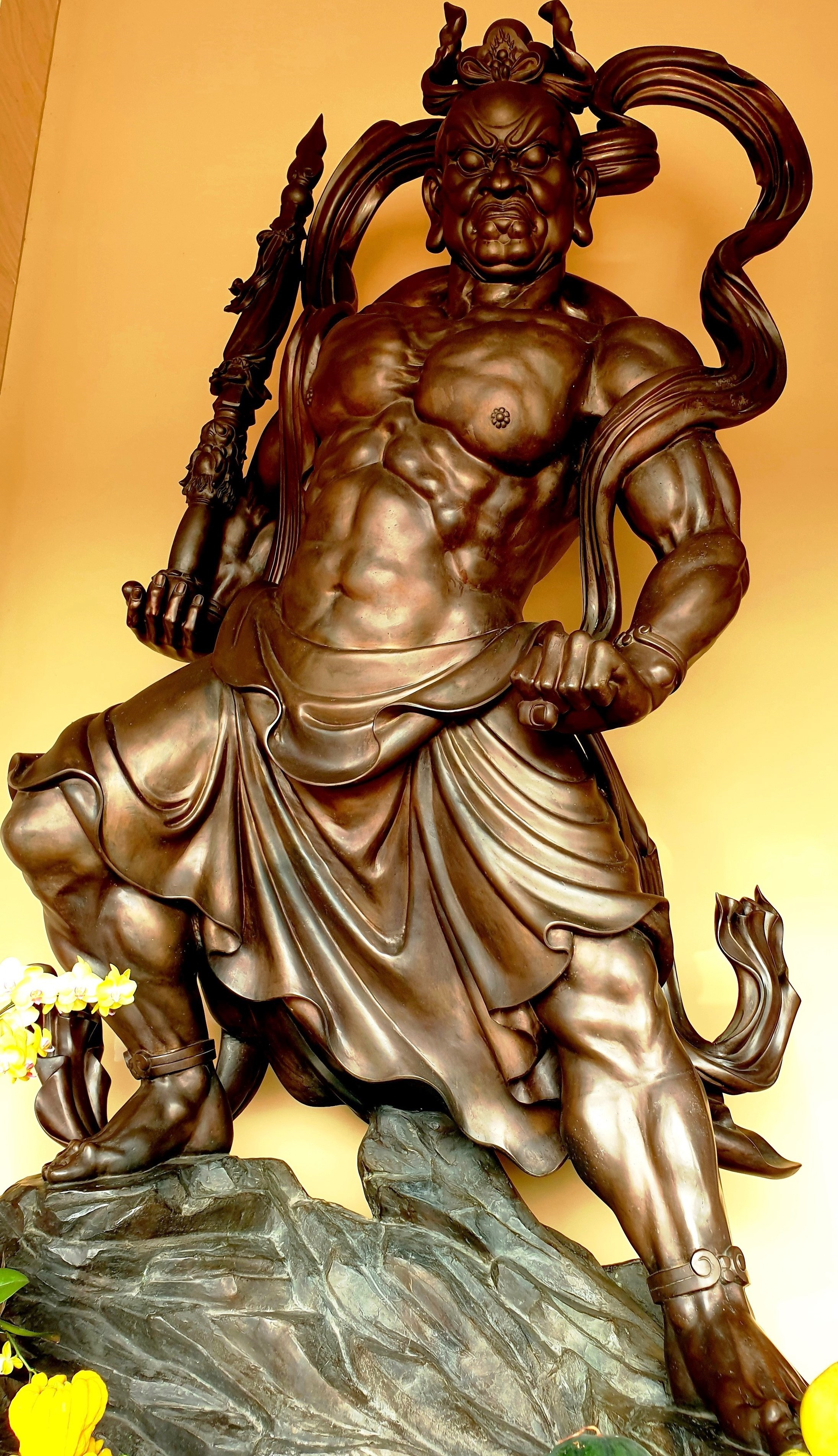
Two out of eight Bát bộ kim cang statues at Phật Cô Đơn temple

== In literature and art ==
Vajrapani holds a prominent position in the Buddhist canon and is identified as a yaksha leader who has become a full-scale bodhisattva. This, reflected through the Mahayana sutras has become an "emblem of esoteric knowledge and the revealer of Buddhist Tantra". As a yaksha, he maintains a special relationship with mountains and caves.

According to Buddhist scholar E. Lamotte, Vajrapani was the chief of the Guhayakas (genies des cavernes), who played an important role in Esoteric Buddhist and Brahmanical literature of India. Lamotte based his assessment on many textual passages which explained Vajrapani's use of his magic vajra to shake mountains.

The Mūlasarvāstivāda vinaya includes a narrative about how Vajrapani used his strength to destroy the boulder Devadatta used in his attempt to murder the Buddha. In the Sarvastivada vinaya vibhasha, Vajrapani protects the pradakshina path with his magic weapon. This association correlates with the presence of large images of Vajrapani in Cave 6 at Aurangabad, located at both the entrance and exit of the circumambulation passage.

== Stories ==
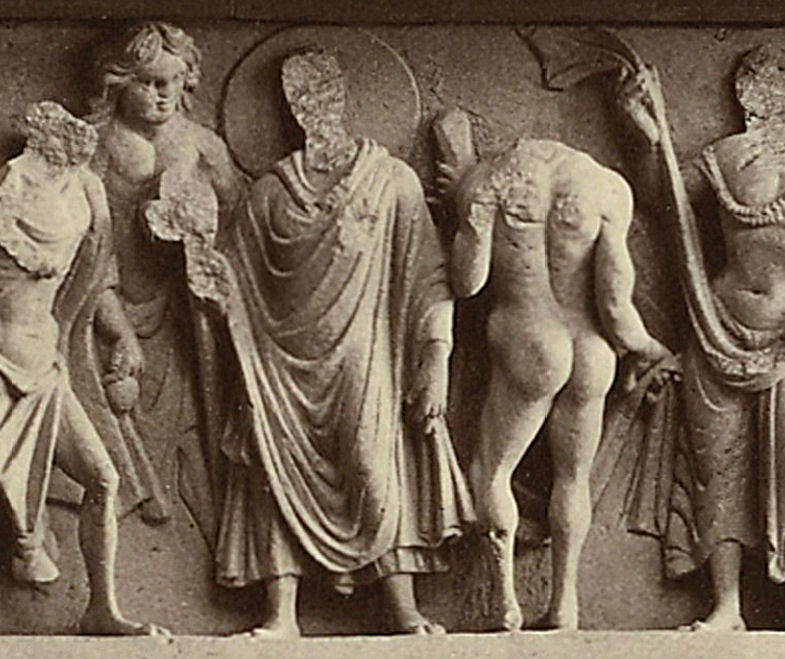
The Buddha and a naked Vajrapani in a frieze at Jamal Garhi, Gandhara

=== Conversion of Ambattha ===
The Pāli Canon's Ambattha Sutta, which challenges the rigid nature of caste system, tells of one instance of him appearing as a sign of the Buddha's power.

At the behest of his teacher, a young Brahmin named Ambattha visited the Buddha. Knowing the Buddha's family to be the Shakya clan, who are Kshatriya caste, Ambattha failed to show him the respect he would a fellow Brahmin. When the Buddha questioned his lack of respect, Ambattha replied it was because the Buddha belongs to a "menial" caste. The Buddha then asked the Brahmin if his family was descended from a "Shakya slave girl". Knowing this to be true, Ambattha refused to answer the question.

Upon refusing to answer the question for a second time, the Buddha warned him that his head would be smashed to bits if he failed to do so a third time. Ambattha was frightened when he saw Vajrapāni manifest above the Buddha's head ready to split the Brahmin's head in seven pieces with his thunderbolt. He quickly confirmed the truth and a lesson on caste ensues.

=== Vajrapāni and Maheśvara ===
A popular story tells how Vajrapāni kills Maheśvara, a manifestation of Shiva depicted as an evil being. The story occurs in several scriptures, most notably the Sarvatathāgatatattvasaṅgraha and the Vajrāpanyābhiṣeka Mahātantra. The story begins with the transformation of the bodhisattva Samantabhadra into Vajrapāni by Vairocana, the cosmic Buddha, receiving a vajra and the name "Vajrāpani". Vairocana then requests Vajrapāni to generate his adamantine family in order to establish a mandala. Vajrapāni refuses because Maheśvara "is deluding beings with his deceitful religious doctrines and engaging in all kinds of violent criminal conduct". Maheśvara and his entourage are dragged to Mount Meru, and all but Maheśvara submit. Vajrapāni and Maheśvara engage in a magical combat, which is won by Vajrapāni. Maheśvara's retinue become part of Vairocana's mandala, except for Maheśvara, who is killed, and his life transferred to another realm where he becomes a Buddha named Bhasmeśvaranirghoṣa, the "Soundless Lord of Ashes".

According to Kalupahana, the story "echoes" the story of the conversion of Ambattha. It is to be understood in the context of the historical competition between Buddhist institutions and Shaivism.in south Asia and southeast Asia.

== Patron saint of Shaolin monastery ==
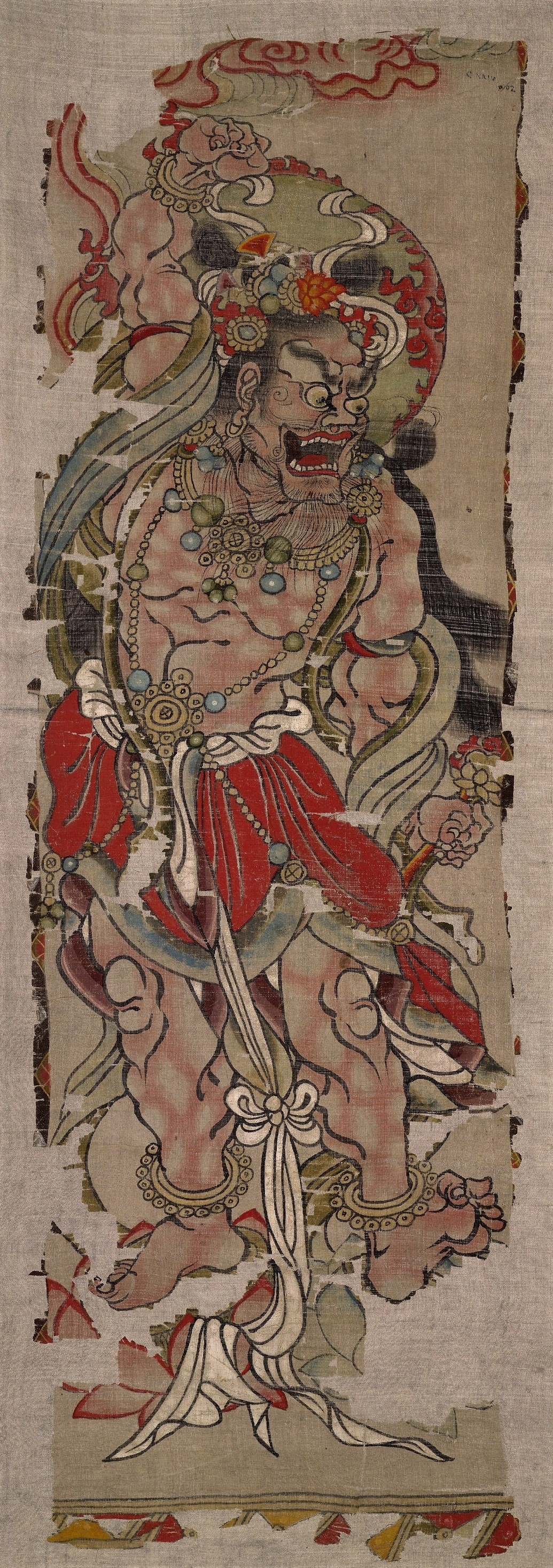
Vajrapāni at Mogao Caves's Hidden Library, Dunhuang, China. Power and anger personified. Late 9th century, Tang dynasty. Ink and colors on silk.

In his book The Shaolin Monastery (2008), Prof. Meir Shahar notes Vajrapāni is the patron saint of the Shaolin Monastery. A short story appearing in Zhang Zhuo's (660–741) Tang anthology shows how the deity had been venerated in the Monastery from at least the eighth century. It is an anecdotal story of how the Shaolin monk Sengchou (480-560) gained supernatural strength and fighting ability by praying to the Vajrapāni and being force-fed raw meat. Shaolin abbot Zuduan (1115–1167) erected a stele in his honor during the Song dynasty. It reads:

According to the scripture [Lotus Sutra], this deity (Narayana) is a manifestation of Avalokitesvara (Guanyin). If a person who compassionately nourishes all living beings employs this [deity's] charm, it will increase his body's strength (zengzhang shen li). It fulfills all vows, being most efficacious. ... Therefore those who study Narayana's hand-symbolism (mudra), those who seek his spell (mantra), and those who search for his image are numerous. Thus we have erected this stele to spread this transmission.

— Stele re-erected (chong shang) by Shaolin's abbot Zuduan

Instead of being considered a stand-alone deity, Shaolin believes Vajrapāni to be an emanation of the Bodhisattva Guanyin. The Chinese scholar A'De noted this was because the Lotus Sutra says Guanyin takes on the visage of whatever being that would best help pervade the dharma. The exact Lotus Sutra passage reads: "To those who can be conveyed to deliverance by the body of the spirit who grasps the vajra (Vajrapāni) he preaches Dharma by displaying the body of the spirit who grasps the vajra."

He was historically worshiped as the progenitor of their famous staff method by the monks themselves. A stele erected by Shaolin abbot Wenzai in 1517 shows the deity's vajra-club had by then been changed to a gun staff, which originally "served as the emblem of the monk". Vajrapāni's yaksha-like Narayana form was eventually equated with one of the four staff-wielding "Kinnara Kings" from the Lotus Sutra in 1575. His name was thus changed from Narayana to "Kinnara King". One of the many versions of a certain tale regarding his creation of the staff method takes place during the Yuan-era Red Turban Rebellion. Bandits lay siege to the monastery, but it is saved by a lowly kitchen worker wielding a long fire poker as a makeshift staff. He leaps into the oven and emerges as a monstrous giant big enough to stand astride both Mount Song and the imperial fort atop Mount Shaoshi (which are five miles apart). The bandits flee when they behold this staff-wielding titan. The Shaolin monks later realize that the kitchen worker was none other than the Kinnara King in disguise. Shahar notes the part of the kitchen worker might have been based on the actual life of the monk Huineng (638–713). In addition, he suggests the mythical elements of the tale were based on the fictional adventures of Sun Wukong from the Chinese epic Journey to the West. He compares the worker's transformation in the stove with Sun's time in Laozi's crucible, their use of the staff, and the fact that Sun and his weapon can both grow to gigantic proportions.

Statues and paintings of kinnaras were commissioned in various halls throughout Shaolin in honor of his defeat of the Red Turban army. A wicker statue woven by the monks and featured in the center of the "Kinnara Hall" was mentioned in Cheng Zongyou's seventeenth century training manual Shaolin Staff Method. However, a century later, it was claimed that the Kinnara King had himself woven the statue. It was destroyed when the monastery was set aflame by the Kuomintang General Shi Yousan in 1928. A "rejuvenated religious cult" arose around kinnaras in the late twentieth century. Shaolin re-erected the shrine to him in 1984 and improved it in 2004.

== Gallery ==
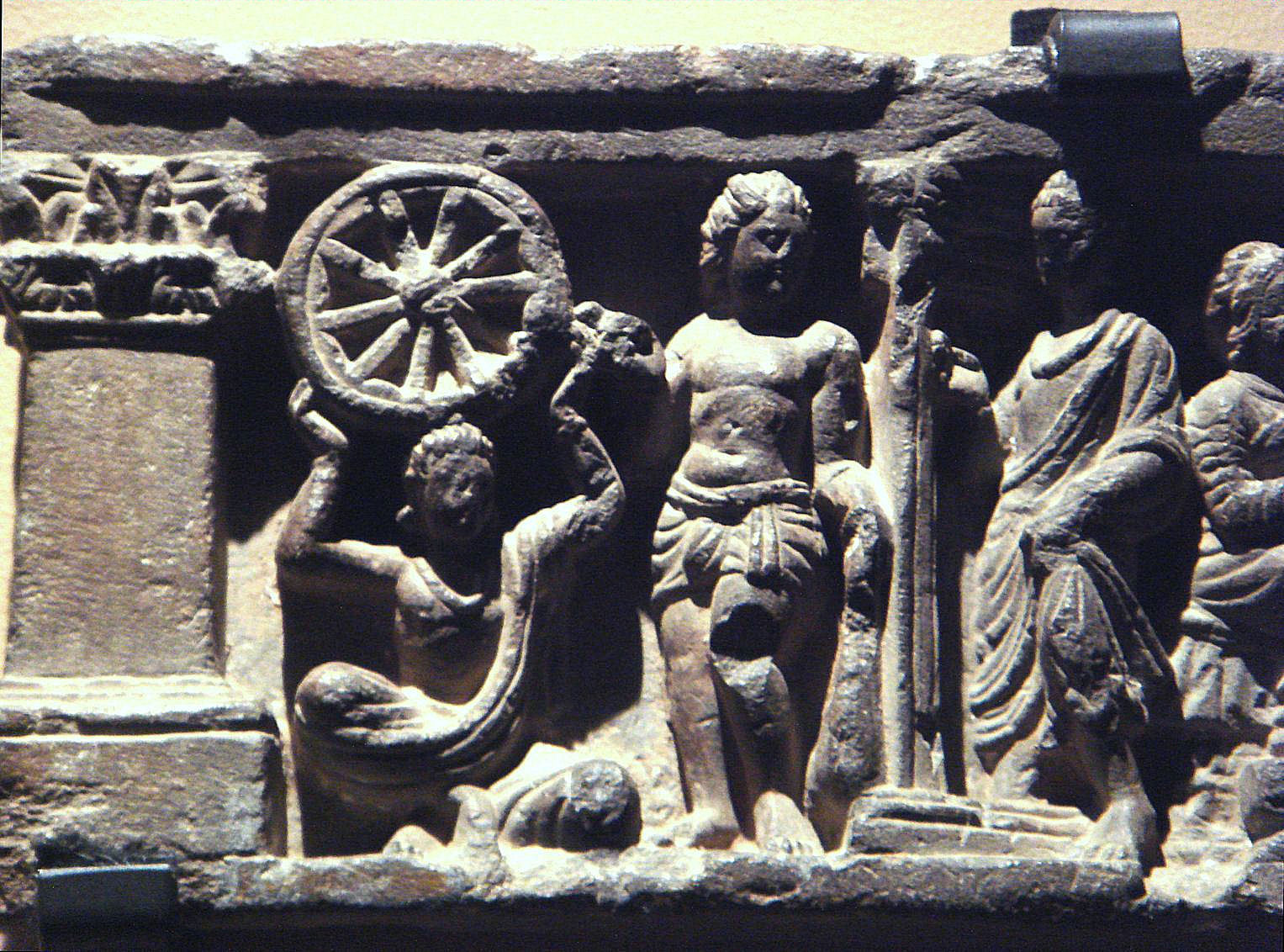
Vajrapāni with Heraklean club

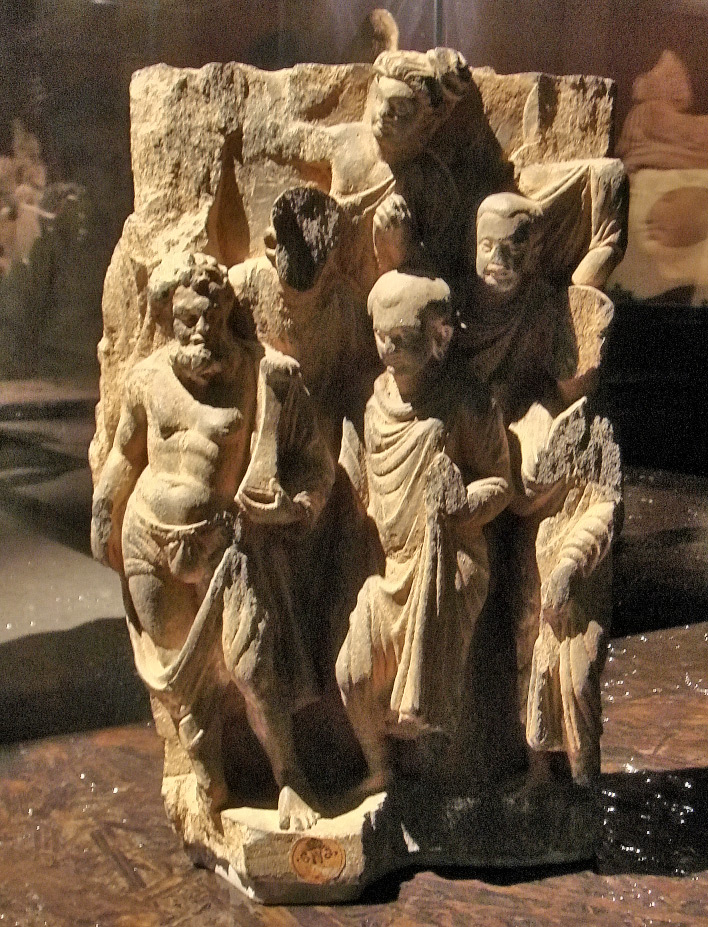
Vajrapāni with a group of Buddhist monks, Gandhara

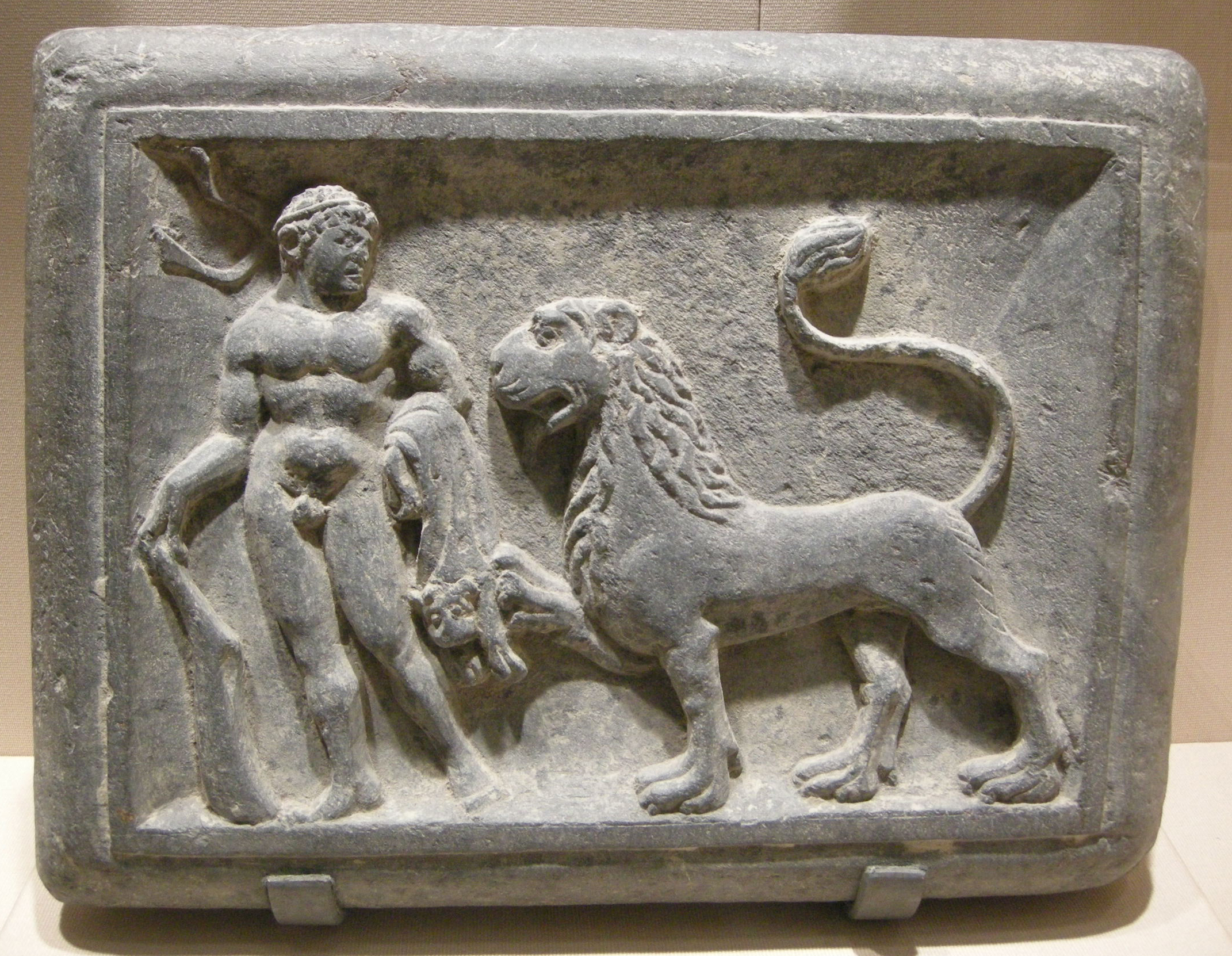
Hercules and the Nemean lion. Gandhara, 1st century

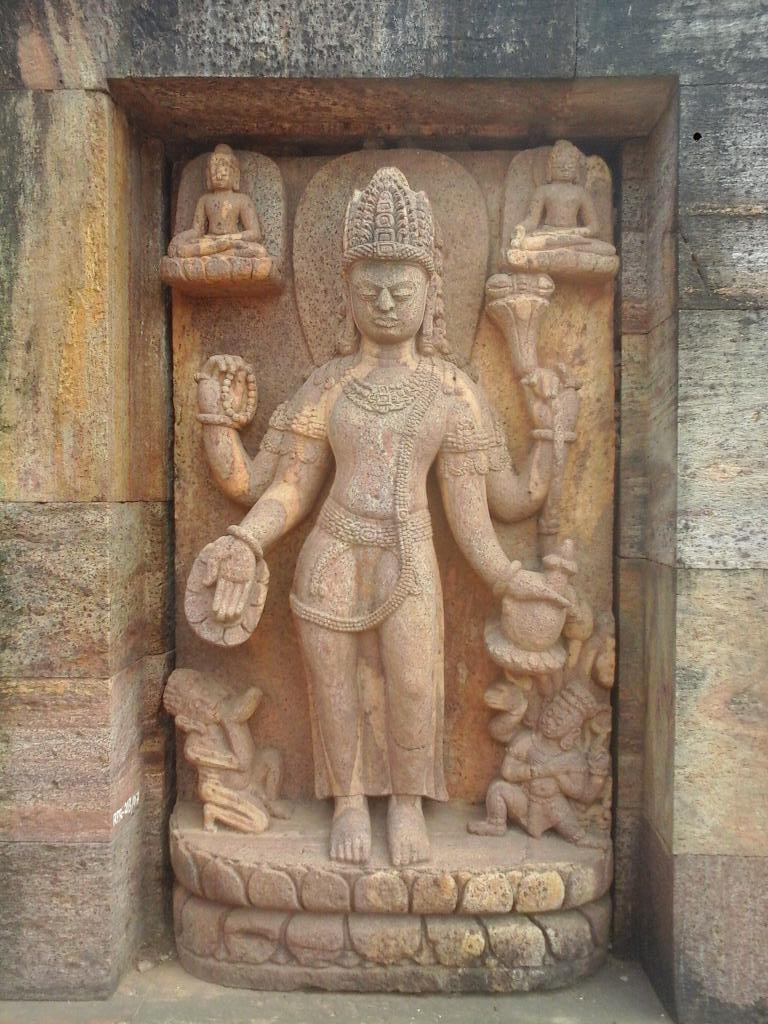
Relief panel, Ratnagiri, Odisha, India, 8th or 9th century

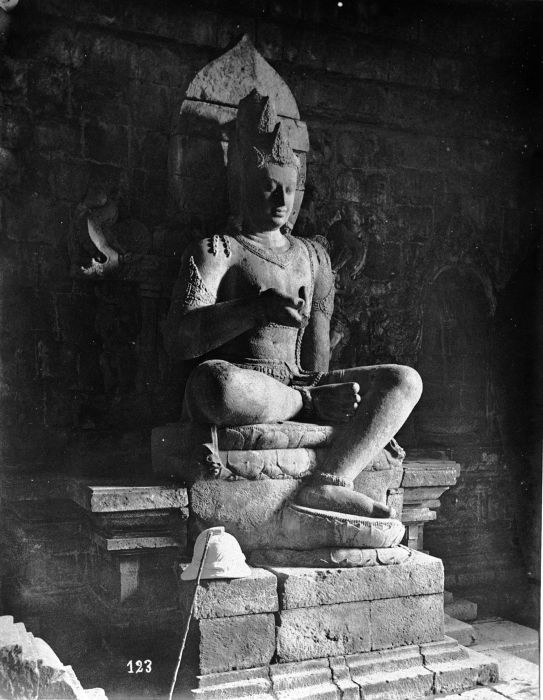
Boddhisattva Vajrapani. Mendut near Borobudur, Central Java, Indonesia. Sailendran art c. 8th century.

1517 stele dedicated to Narayana's defeat of the Red Turban rebels
