= Meir Shahar =

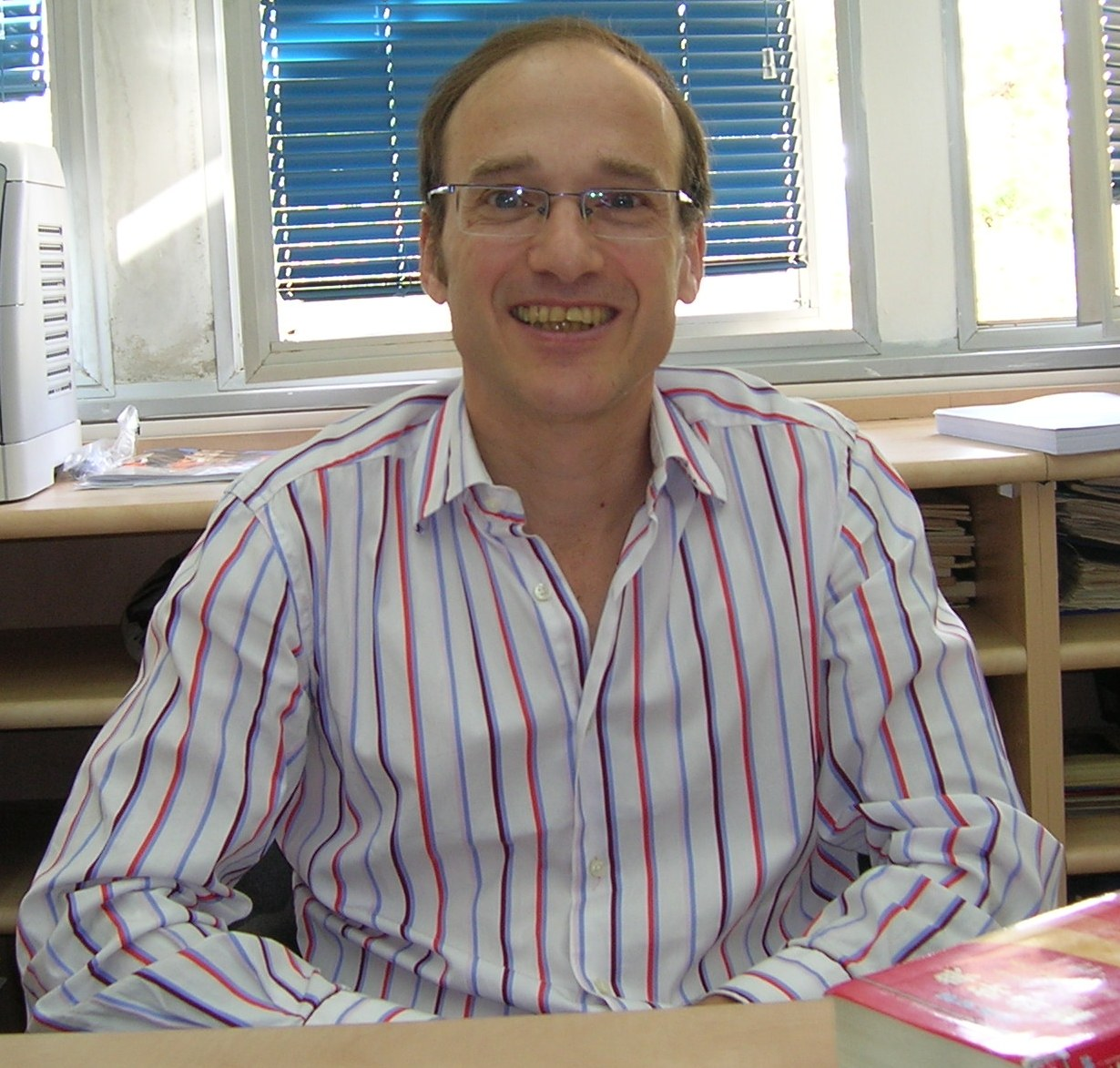

Meir Shahar (Hebrew: מאיר שחר; born in 1959 in Jerusalem) is the Shaul Eisenberg Chair for East Asian Affairs at Tel Aviv University.

== Academic career ==
Meir Shahar attended the Hebrew University of Jerusalem and then studied Chinese in Taipei. He obtained a PhD in Asian languages and civilizations at Harvard University in 1992.His research interests include the interplay of Chinese religion and Chinese literature, Chinese martial-arts history, Chinese esoteric Buddhism, and the impact of Indian mythology of the Chinese pantheon of divinities.

== Published works ==
=== Books ===
- Chinese and Tibetan Esoteric Buddhism. Co-edited with Yael Bentor. Leiden: Brill, 2017.
- Oedipal God: The Chinese Nezha and his Indian Origins. Honolulu: University of Hawai'i Press, 2015.
- India in the Chinese Imagination: Myth, Religion, and Thought. Co-edited with John Kieschnick. Philadelphia: The University of Pennsylvania Press, 2013.
- The Shaolin Monastery: History, Religion and the Chinese Martial Arts, The University of Hawai'i Press, 2008.
- Monkey and the Magic Gourd (קוף ודלעת הקסמים) (in Hebrew). By Wu Cheng'en. Translated and Adapted by Meir Shahar. Drawings by Noga Zhang Shahar (נגה ג'אנג שחר). Tel Aviv: Am Oved, 2008.
- Crazy Ji: Chinese Religion and Popular Literature, Harvard University Asia Center, 1998
- The Chinese Religion (הדת הסינית) (in Hebrew). Tel Aviv: The Broadcast University Series Press, 1998.
- Unruly Gods: Divinity and Society in China. Co-edited with Robert Weller. Honolulu: University of Hawai'i Press, 1996.

=== Essays ===
- Shahar, Meir (2013). "Violence in Chinese Religious Traditions". In Jerryson, Michael; Juergensmeyer, Mark; Kitts, Margo (eds.). The Oxford Handbook of Religion and Violence. pp. 183–196. doi:10.1093/oxfordhb/9780199759996.013.0009. ISBN 978-0-19-975999-6.
- Shahar, Meir (2014). "Indian Mythology and the Chinese Imagination: Nezha, Nalakūbara, and Kṛṣṇạ". India in the Chinese Imagination. pp. 21–45. doi:10.9783/9780812208924.21. ISBN 978-0-8122-4560-8.
- Shahar, Meir (2012). "Religion in The Story of the Stone". In Schonebaum, Andrew; Lu, Tina (eds.). Approaches to Teaching The Story of the Stone. Modern Language Association. pp. 133–143. ISBN 978-1-60329-111-8.
- Shahar, M (2012). "Diamond Body: The Origins of Invulnerability in the Chinese Martial Arts". In Lo, Vivienne (ed.). Perfect Bodies: Sports, Medicine and Immortality. British Museum. pp. 119–128. ISBN 978-0-86159-188-6. OCLC 823880846.
- Shahar, Meir (1996). "Vernacular Fiction and the Transmission of Gods' Cults in Late Imperial China". In Shahar, Meir; Weller, Robert P. (eds.). Unruly Gods: Divinity and Society in China. University of Hawai'i Press. pp. 184–211. ISBN 978-0-8248-1724-4. JSTOR j.ctt6wr0f7.9. OCLC 45733689.
- Shahar, Meir (2001). "Ming-Period Evidence of Shaolin Martial Practice". Harvard Journal of Asiatic Studies. 61 (2): 359–413. doi:10.2307/3558572. JSTOR 3558572.
- Shahar, Meir (2000). "Epigraphy, Buddhist Historiography, and Fighting Monks: The Case of The Shaolin Monastery". Asia Major. 13 (2): 15–36. JSTOR 41645561.
- Shahar, Meir (1992). "The Lingyin Si Monkey Disciples and The Origins of Sun Wukong". Harvard Journal of Asiatic Studies. 52 (1): 193–224. doi:10.2307/2719331. JSTOR 2719331. Gale A12559459.

=== Reviews ===
The Shaolin Monastery: History, Religion and the Chinese Martial Arts

- Henning, Stanley E. (2008). "Review of The Shaolin Monastery: History, Religion, and the Chinese Martial Arts". China Review International. 15 (3): 423–430. doi:10.1353/cri.0.0177. JSTOR 23733226.
- Chau, Adam Yuet (2009). "Review of The Shaolin Monastery: History, Religion, and the Chinese Martial Arts". The China Journal (62): 151–153. doi:10.1086/tcj.62.20648128. JSTOR 20648128.

Oedipal God: The Chinese Nezha and his Indian Origins

- Bryson, Megan (2 July 2016). "Oedipal God: The Chinese Nezha and His Indian Origins". Journal of Chinese Religions. 44 (2): 204–206. doi:10.1080/0737769X.2016.1207372. S2CID 171163813.

Crazy Ji: Chinese Religion and Popular Literature

- Wang, Richard (2002). "Review of Crazy Ji: Chinese Religion and Popular Literature". History of Religions. 41 (3): 294–297. doi:10.1086/463687. JSTOR 3176537.
- Kardos, Michael A. (2001). "Review of Crazy Ji: Chinese Religion and Popular Literature". Asian Folklore Studies. 60 (2): 366–368. doi:10.2307/1179071. JSTOR 1179071.
