= Chong (state) =

Ancient Chinese state

Chong 崇
- c. 2300 BCE–c. 1046-1051 BC?
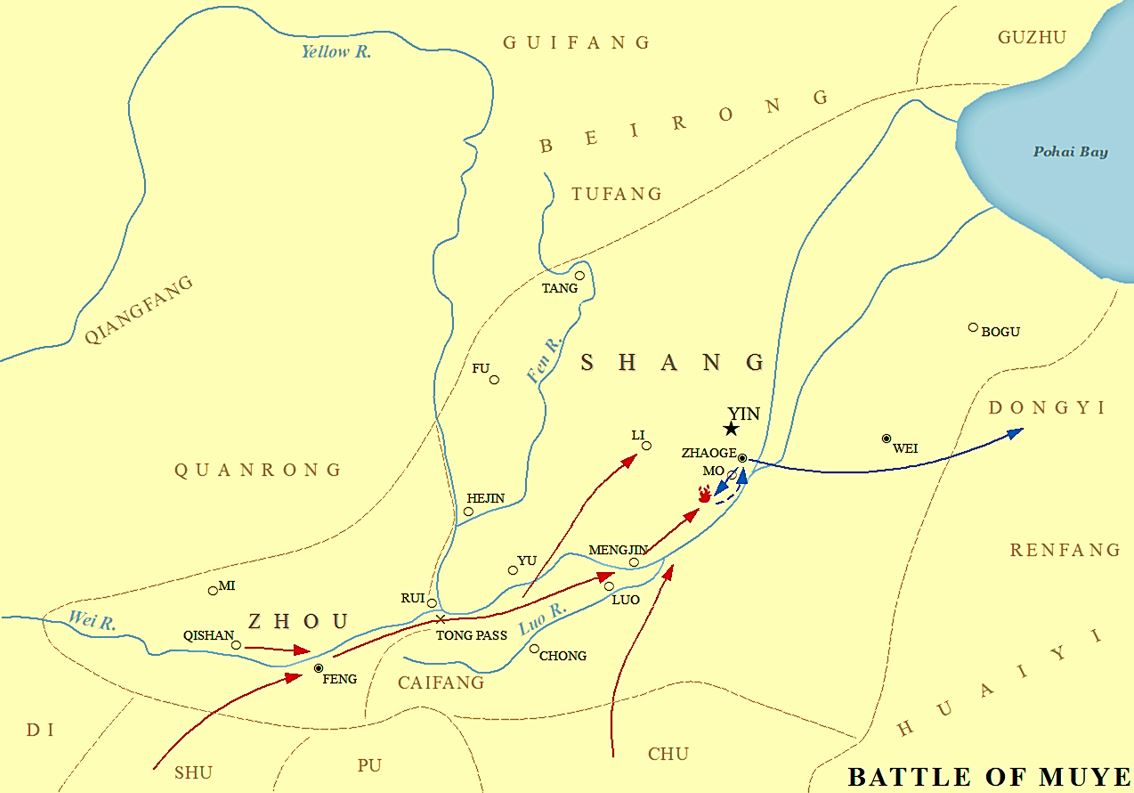
- Map of the Battle of Muye, showing the State of Chong.
- Common languages: Old Chinese
- Government: Monarchy
- Earl (伯) or Marquess (侯)
  - c. 2300-2200 BCE: Gun, Earl of Chong
  - c. 1200 BCE: Marquess Hu of Cóng (虎琮侯); Marquess Bao of Cóng (豹琮侯)
  - c. 1000-1050 BCE: Marquess Hu of Chong
- Historical era: Youyu clan Shang dynasty
  - Established: c. 2300 BCE
  - Gun attempts and fails to control the Great Flood: c. 2300–2200 BCE
  - Marquess Hu betrays King Wen of Zhou: c. 1100-1000 BCE
  - Chong surrenders to Predynastic Zhou: c. 1040 BCE?
  - Disestablished: c. 1046-1051 BC?
- Today part of: Mount Song, Huyi District in Henan, and/or Guanzhong, modern-day Weicheng District, Xianyang. Thought to be the Laoniupo site (老牛坡遗址).

Chong
- Chong (虫) in Oracle bone script.
- Chinese: 崇
Transcriptions
Standard Mandarin
- Hanyu Pinyin: Chóng
- Wade–Giles: Chung^{2}
Wu
- Romanization: Zon^{5}
Yue: Cantonese
- Jyutping: Sung^{4}
Middle Chinese
- Middle Chinese: Dzrjuwng
Old Chinese
- Baxter–Sagart (2014): /*[dz]<r>uŋ/
- Zhengzhang: /*zruŋ/

Oracle bone variant
- Chinese: 琮
Transcriptions
Standard Mandarin
- Hanyu Pinyin: Cóng
- Wade–Giles: Ts'ung^{2}
Yue: Cantonese
- Jyutping: Cung^{4}
Middle Chinese
- Middle Chinese: Dzowng
Old Chinese
- Zhengzhang: /*z:uŋ/

Oracle bone variant
- Traditional Chinese: 蟲
- Simplified Chinese: 虫
Transcriptions
Standard Mandarin
- Hanyu Pinyin: Chóng
- Wade–Giles: Chung^{2}
Wu
- Romanization: Zon^{6}
Yue: Cantonese
- Jyutping: Sung^{4}
Middle Chinese
- Middle Chinese: drjuwng
Old Chinese
- Baxter–Sagart (2014): /*C.lruŋ/
- Zhengzhang: /*l'uŋ/

Chong (崇) was an ancient Chinese state that existed from the Youyu clan period to around the time of the Western Zhou dynasty.

== Etymology and identification ==
Chong appears to have been written as (虫) in Oracle bones, which mention an Earl of Chong (虫伯) who was allied with the Shang and was mentioned in oracular inscriptions in Zhouyuan. Linguistic evidence implies that the character Chong (虫) is a near-homophone with the Chong 崇 state in received texts even in Old Chinese, and these are thus thought to be the same state. (Note: Zhengzhang reconstructs chóng 虫 as /*l'uŋ/, and chóng 崇 as /*zruŋ/.)

Later Oracle bones mention a Marquess Hu of Cóng (虎琮侯) and a Marquess Bao of Cóng (豹琮侯), whose state was a military ally of Wu Ding, and thought to be the same one through linguistic evidence. (Note: The working corpus of texts with the glyph as mentioned by Chen Jian 陳劍 include 《合集》8092, 8093, 8098, 152正, 7076, 32981, 10474, 10976正, 5668, 6949正, 32806, 32804, 3310, 32087, 32805, 5505, 8095, 3314, as well as《怀特》362 and 393.) The corpus details the Marquess attending Wu Ding's court, receiving blessings for their invasions of Predynastic Zhou and other polities, receiving permission for hunting, receiving resources, and more. However, the reading and reconstruction for this figure are disputed. Furthermore, as it is very rare for personal names to be used in oracular inscriptions, it is difficult to tell which marquess is being talked about, making it difficult to reconstruct their biographies.

== History ==
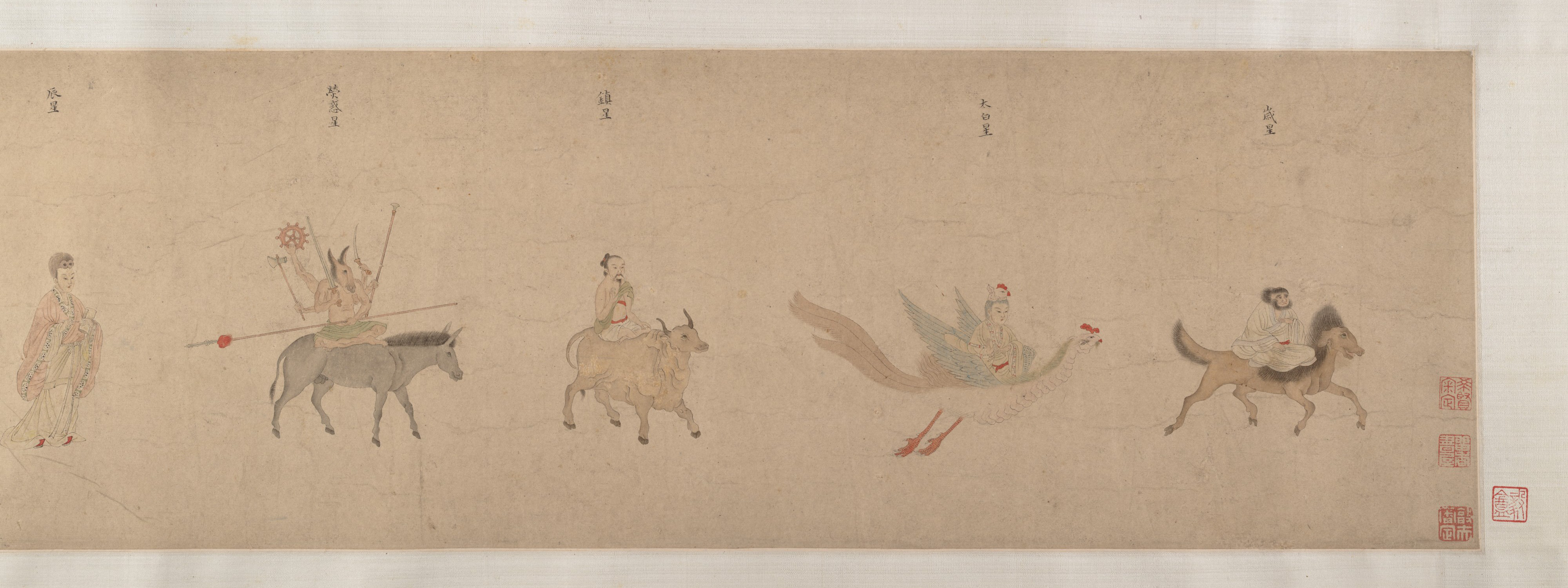
Marquess Hu of Chong

The earliest historical records of the State of Chong comes from various Zhou-Qin dynasty texts, such as the Book of Documents and Bamboo Annals. In these documents, during the period of Emperor Yao and the Youyu clan, a severe flood occurred around the Yellow River and River Yangtze, causing severe suffering to the populace. The Bamboo Annals claim that during the 61st year of his reign, Emperor Yao turned to Gun, then-Earl of Chong, for assistance. However, after 8-9 (Note: Records of the Grand Historian says 9, the Bamboo Annals say 8) years, Gun still failed to successfully control the floods, and was dismissed from office. The Book of Documents records that Gun was imprisoned at Yushan following him taking a special kind of earth that expands in response to water, without permission from Yao. Due to this crime, Gun was defined as one of the Four Criminals of the Yao-Shun period, and his son, Yu the Great, would redeem himself by controlling the floods and founding the Xia dynasty. (Note: It should be stressed that the legitimacy and/or extent of the traditional Great Flood narrative is disputed.)

During the Late Shang period, Marquess Hu of Chong was among a trio of feudal leaders defending the southern parts of Shang dynasty territory, along with the Marquess of E and King Wen of Zhou (then Ji Chang). In return for acting as the state's vanguard, these states received the benefits of Shang hegemony. The Shang dynasty king, Di Xin, repeatedly went to war against the Dongyi to subdue tribal states. However, Predynastic Zhou became increasingly dissatisfied with Di Xin's rule, and King Wen resolved to gain support to overthrow him. When Marquess Hu heard of the plot, he told Di Xin, which resulted in King Wen's imprisonment. He was eventually released after San Yisheng flattered Di Xin with gifts and women, but the plot continued. Eventually, still under King Wen, Predynastic Zhou went to war with Chong and besieged its walls for thirty days. The Classic of Poetry houses a poem named Huang Yi (皇矣), which details Shangdi itself telling King Wen how to attack Chong. In the passage, it orders his army to bring grappling ladders called gouyuan (鉤援), as well as lin (臨) "siege-observation towers" and chong (衝) "siege rams" to break down the nation's walls. Wenwang you Sheng (文王有聲), a separate poem, would commemorate King Wen's victory. As King Wen's army was unrelenting in its pressure, Marquess Hu eventually surrendered, and his state dissolved, being replaced with Chengyi (程邑) and later Fengjing as the new capital of Predynastic Zhou, within the historical region of Guanzhong.

After the defeat of Chong, King Wu of Zhou began the Battle of Muye against Di Xin's kingdom and won, beginning the Western Zhou period. The region where Chong once stood was sacked by the Quanrong in 771 BCE during the Battle of Mount Li between King You of Zhou and the Marquis of Shen.

Zuo Zhuan records a city (or possibly state) from the Spring and Autumn Period also named Chong, but it appears to be unrelated.

== Notable people ==
Gun in oracle bone script.

- Marquess Hu of Chong
- Gun, Earl of Chong

=== Fictional people ===
- Chong Heihu
- Chong Yingbiao
