= Su Quanzhong =

Character from Fengshen Yanyi

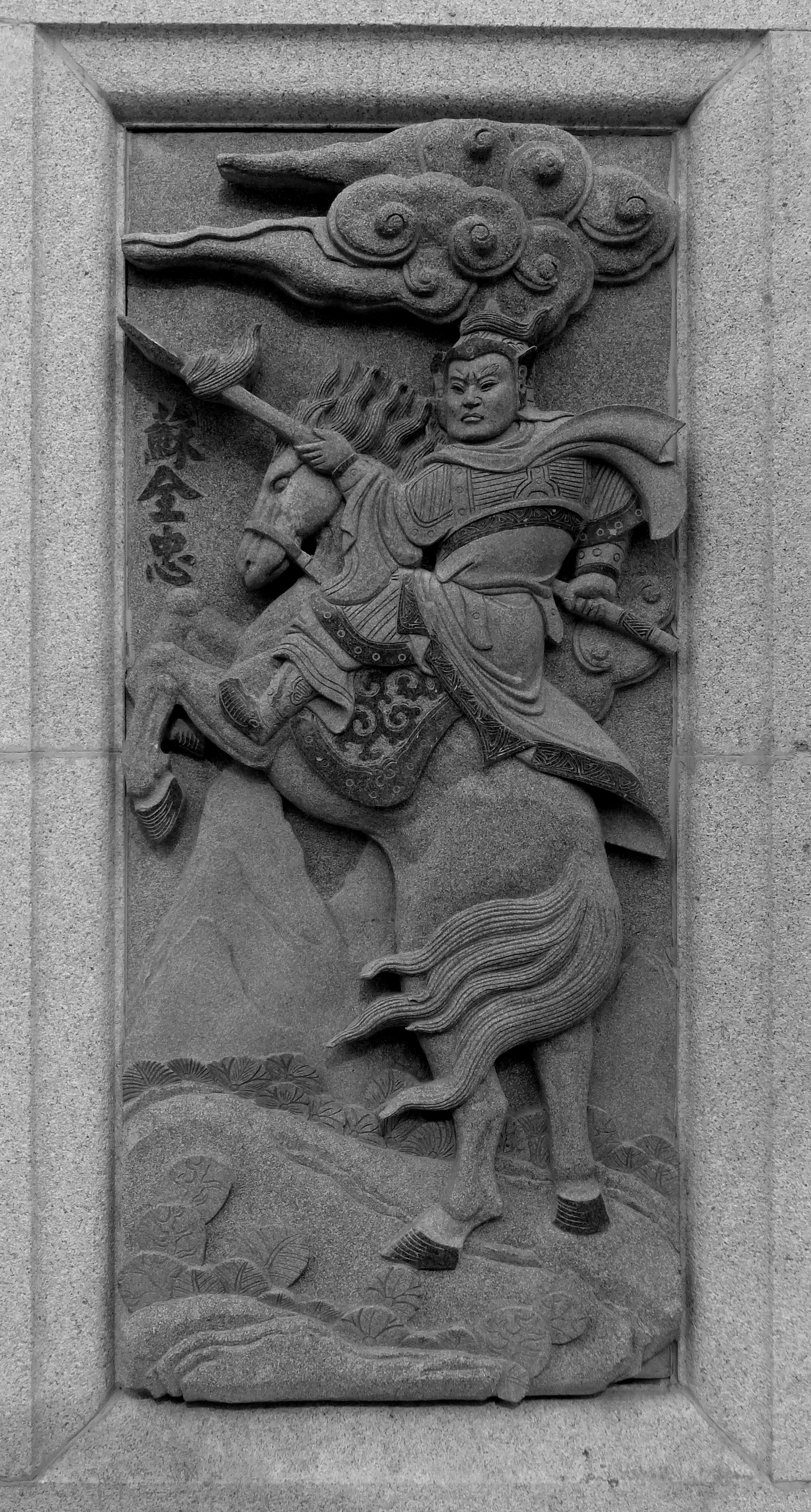
Su Quanzhong

Su Quanzhong (Chinese: 苏全忠; pinyin: Sū Quánzhōng) is a character in the 16th-century Chinese novel Fengshen Yanyi. He is the son of Su Hu and the elder brother of Su Daji, who becomes a favored concubine of Di Xin. He is a skilled warrior who fights with a halberd.

== Origin ==
Su Quanzhong is not mentioned in early accounts of Daji. The Guoyu records that King Zhou of Shang attacked the Yousu clan (有蘇氏), which then gave Daji to him. The Records of the Grand Historian also names Daji as a favorite of King Zhou. Neither work mentions her brother or gives the name Su Quanzhong. Although Daji appears in these historical texts, there is no archaeological evidence confirming her existence. Su Quanzhong is generally treated as a fictional character from later stories.

== Fengshen Yanyi ==
In Fengshen Yanyi, Su Quanzhong is the son of Su Hu, the marquis of Jizhou and a general of the Shang dynasty. He is described as a handsome and accomplished warrior with a round face, red lips, and hair fastened with a large golden ring adorned with two bird feathers. Renowned for his mastery of the silver-pointed halberd, he serves as one of Jizhou's foremost defenders.

When Chong Houhu leads a coalition against Su Hu, Su Quanzhong commands the defence of Jizhou. He defeats Chong Houhu's general Mei Wu in single combat after approximately twenty rounds of fighting, kills two of the coalition's leading officers, and wounds Chong Houhu in the arm. He later launches a surprise night attack from the surrounding mountains, forcing Chong Houhu to retreat once again.

To break the stalemate, Chong Houhu summons his younger brother, Chong Heihu, a disciple of the Jiejiao immortal who possesses a magical gourd capable of capturing opponents. Ignoring his father's advice to remain within the city walls, Su Quanzhong rides out to challenge Chong Heihu. Although he displays superior martial skill during their duel, Chong Heihu eventually uses the magical gourd to blind Su Quanzhong's horse and capture him alive.

After Su Hu submits to the Shang court, Su Quanzhong is released and later accompanies his father in joining the forces of King Wu of Zhou. He serves under Jiang Ziya throughout the Zhou campaign against the Shang dynasty. During the Battle of Tongguan Pass, after his father is killed by Yu Zhao, Su Quanzhong attempts to avenge him but is defeated by Yu Guang before later being killed by Yu Da during the ensuing battles.

Following the Zhou victory, Jiang Ziya appoints Su Quanzhong as the Lord of Pojun Star (破军星) during the Investiture of the Gods.

=== Silver-pointed halberd ===
A poem in Fengshen Yanyi describes Su Quanzhong's silver-pointed halberd as having been forged in Laojun's furnace.

怎见好戟：能工巧匠费经营，老君炉里炼成兵，造出一根银尖戟，安邦定国正乾坤

Translation:

How can one recognize a fine halberd? Skilled craftsmen labour with great care; forged in Laojun's furnace, a silver-pointed halberd is created to secure the realm and restore order.

— A poem from Fengshen Yanyi.

According to the study Chinese Folk Gods, Su Quanzhong's silver-pointed halberd and Zhu Bajie's nine-toothed rake in Journey to the West are both traditionally described as having been forged in Laojun's furnace.

== Tomb ==
In Wen County, Henan, a burial mound called Lianzhu Tomb (连珠冢) is traditionally believed to be the grave of Su Quanzhong and his father, Su Hu. According to old county records and local folklore, the two joined the Zhou forces after Su Daji was given to King Zhou. They were later killed in the war against the Shang dynasty and buried there. The tomb is on Huanghe Road in Wen County. It originally consisted of two mounds joined by a bridge. A temple dedicated to Sun Zhen once stood on the site but was destroyed during the Japanese invasion of China.

About 100 meters west of Lianzhu Tomb is Yuntuan Tomb (云团冢), which is traditionally believed to be the grave of Zheng Lun, a general serving Su Hu. Suwang Village, north of Wen County, is also said to have been Su Hu's home.

== Worship ==
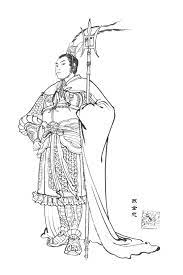
Su Quanzhong

In Fengshen Yanyi, Jiang Ziya appoints Su Quanzhong as Pojun (破軍), one of the nine gods of the Northern Dipper. He is also known as Pojun Xingjun (破軍星君, "Lord of the Army-Breaking Star").

Pojun is the seventh star of the Big Dipper, known in modern astronomy as Eta Ursae Majoris. In Taoism, he is called Tian Guan Pojun Xingjun (天關破軍星君). The seven visible stars of the Big Dipper, together with two hidden stars, are worshipped as the Nine Star Lords.

In Taiwan, the Big Dipper gods are worshipped at Taoist temples, often together with the Southern Dipper gods. Worshippers take part in rituals called baidou (拜斗) and pray for protection, good fortune, and long life. Some Taiwanese traditions also name Su Quanzhong as Pojun Xingjun, following Fengshen Yanyi.

Su Quanzhong is also enshrined at Shanziya Temple (扇子崖廟) on Mount Tai in Shandong. The temple was built during the late Ming or early Qing dynasty. It was later damaged and rebuilt in 1988. The main hall is dedicated to Yuanshi Tianzun. Su Quanzhong stands on the western side of the hall with other gods, including Huang Tianxiang, Huang Tianlu, Xue Ehu, Yin Jiao, Huang Tianjue, Fang Bi, and Wei Tuo. The eastern side has statues of Huang Tianhua, Tuxingsun, Han Dulong, Yin Hong, Hong Jin, Fang Xiang, and other deities.

== In popular culture ==
His story is widely portrayed in Chinese operas and other forms of art, especially in Peking opera.
