= Lingji =

- Journey to the West character
- First appearance: Chapter 21
- Last appearance: Chapter 59
- Created by: Wu Cheng'en
- Based on: Literary Buddhist figure

In-universe information
- Species: Bodhisattva
- Occupation: Guardian deity
- Weapon: Flying Dragon Staff; Wind-Calming Pill
- Home: Little Sumeru Mountain
- Affiliation: Tathagata Buddha
- Role: Helper of Sun Wukong against wind-based magic

Lingji (Chinese: 灵吉; pinyin: Língjí) is a fictional Bodhisattva in the 16th-century Chinese novel Journey to the West by Wu Cheng'en. In the novel, he resides at Little Sumeru Mountain (小须弥山) and is called upon to subdue demons associated with the wind.

== Religious and historical origins ==
In the novel, Lingji is a bodhisattva, but he is not found in Buddhist scriptures or records. Some internet users have created false information and evidence to present Lingji as a historical Buddhist figure. In 2024, the Chinese Academy of History stated that Lingji was a fictional character created for the novel. It also said there was no reliable historical or archaeological evidence that he had existed outside the story.

Some writers have tried to identify Lingji with Mahasthamaprapta (大勢至菩薩). Another suggestion links him to Samantabhadra (普賢菩薩), who is also called Bianji (遍吉). Scholar Lee Fong-mao says these ideas are uncertain, and Lingji's identity remains unclear.

Lingji has also been compared with Du'e Zhenren from Fengshen Yanyi. Both characters have magical objects that can stop strong winds. Du'e Zhenren owns the Wind-Fixing Pearl (定風珠), which is borrowed to help break the Wind-Roaring Formation. In Journey to the West, Lingji gives Sun Wukong the Wind-Calming Pill (定風丹) to protect him from Princess Iron Fan's magical fan. Scholars have also disagreed about whether Journey to the West or Fengshen Yanyi borrowed material from the other.

== In Journey to the West ==
In the novel, Lingji Bodhisattva lives at Little Sumeru Mountain (小須彌山). He helps Sun Wukong on two occasions when Wukong faces enemies who use powerful winds. The Yellow Wind Demon can blow a powerful wind called the Samadhi Divine Wind (三昧神風). During their fight, the wind hurts Wukong's eyes and forces him to retreat. An old man gives him medicine, and his eyes recover the next morning. Wukong later learns that the old man was one of the guardian gods sent to protect Tang Sanzang. Wukong then hears that the demon fears Lingji Bodhisattva. Another old man, who turns out to be Taibai Jinxing, tells him to travel south to Little Sumeru Mountain, where Lingji lives.

When Wukong arrives, Lingji tells him that the Buddha had ordered him to watch over the demon. The demon was once a yellow-haired marten mouse living at the foot of the Buddha's Spirit Vulture Peak. It had stolen oil from a holy lamp and fled to the human world. The Buddha had given Lingji two magical items, the Flying Dragon Staff (飛龍寶杖) and the Wind-Calming Pill (定風丹), to control the demon. Lingji had caught it before but allowed it to live in the mountains, on the condition that it would not harm anyone. Lingji then goes with Wukong to Yellow Wind Mountain. He throws the Flying Dragon Staff from the sky, and it turns into an eight-clawed golden dragon. The dragon catches the demon and makes it return to its original form. Lingji takes the demon back to the Buddha for judgment.

Later, the pilgrims reach the Flaming Mountains, where a great fire blocks their path. Wukong visits Princess Iron Fan to borrow her magical Banana Fan (芭蕉扇), which can put out the fire. The princess is angry with Wukong because her son, Red Boy, was taken away by Guanyin. She refuses to lend him the fan. When Wukong fights her, she uses the fan to blow him far away.

Wukong lands at Little Sumeru Mountain and visits Lingji again. Lingji tells him that the Banana Fan is an ancient magical leaf from Mount Kunlun. He also says that he has never used the Wind-Calming Pill given to him by the Buddha. Lingji offers the pill to Wukong and sews it into the collar of his clothes. When Wukong returns to Princess Iron Fan, her fan can no longer blow him away. The princess then hides inside her cave. Wukong turns into a small insect, enters her tea, and is swallowed by her. Once inside her stomach, he causes her great pain until she agrees to give him a fan. However, she gives him a false fan, which makes the fire on the Flaming Mountains grow even stronger.

== Interpretations ==
The Qing dynasty Daoist Liu Yiming explained the story of Lingji Bodhisattva in his book Xiyou Yuanzhi (西遊原旨). He used Neidan (internal alchemy) and the Five Elements to explain the characters. He saw the Yellow Wind Demon as a sign of doubt and a restless mind. The demon's yellow colour stands for Earth. Lingji Bodhisattva, on the other hand, stands for a clear mind. Liu linked Lingji's home in the south with Fire and light. For Liu, Lingji's defeat of the demon shows how a clear mind can overcome doubt and restless thoughts.

== In popular culture ==
Lingji Bodhisattva appears in the 2024 video game Black Myth: Wukong. In the game, he appears as a headless monk who plays a sanxian and helps the main character. His head was taken by the Yellow Wind Sage, a rat demon. Some players believed that his missing head was a reference to Chinese Buddhist statues whose heads had been stolen and taken overseas. Some also linked the story to the looting of Chinese cultural objects by foreign powers during the late Qing dynasty.

Some players also linked the Yellow Wind Sage to the Chinese saying shǔqiègǒudào (鼠窃狗盗), which means petty theft. They saw the rat demon stealing Lingji's head as a reference to the theft of Chinese cultural objects.

Some internet users wrongly believed that Lingji was a real Buddhist figure whose statue dated from around AD 550. Online posts claimed that his missing head was kept in the British Museum. Some people then asked the museum to return it to China. However, reports explained that the Buddhist head shown in these posts was not Lingji, but a statue of Guanyin.

In August 2024, the Chinese Academy of History said that Lingji was a fictional character from Journey to the West. However, the academy also noted that many real Chinese Buddhist statues had lost their heads and had been taken overseas.

=== Shaanbei Shuoshu performance ===
In the second chapter of Black Myth: Wukong, the headless Lingji Bodhisattva performs Shaanbei Shuoshu, a traditional form of storytelling and singing from northern Shaanxi. He plays a three-stringed instrument called the sanxian. The singing and music were performed by Xiong Zhuying (熊竹英), a Shaanbei Shuoshu performer and an inheritor of this traditional art. He also helped write the song's lyrics with the game's creators.

The performance became popular on social media after the game was released. Some Chinese and foreign viewers called the singing "Chinese rap" (中式rap). A video of the performance received more than ten million views on social media.

The song was kept in its original Chinese audio in versions of the game made for other languages. Players could read translated subtitles while listening to the Chinese singing. A study by Ding Yin in 2026 examined how the English subtitles kept the meaning of the song while using words that English-speaking players could understand.
