= Mei Wu =

Mei Wu (Chinese: 梅武; pinyin: Méi Wǔ) is a fictional character in the Chinese Ming dynasty novel Investiture of the Gods (Fengshen Yanyi). He is a subordinate general (偏将) under Chong Houhu, the Grand Duke of the North.

== Role in the novel ==
Mei Wu appears in the second chapter, during Chong Houhu's campaign against Su Hu, the Marquis of Ji. After Su Hu rebels against King Zhou of Shang, Chong Houhu leads an army against Ji Province. Mei Wu is one of his generals and volunteers to fight Su Hu's son, Su Quanzhong.

The novel describes Mei Wu as wearing a phoenix-winged helmet and golden armor and riding a horse. He carries an axe. At the battle outside Ji Province, he challenges Su Quanzhong and accuses him of rebelling against the Shang dynasty. The two fight for twenty rounds before Su Quanzhong kills Mei Wu with his halberd.

In the final chapter, Jiang Ziya assigns divine titles to those who died during the war. In the received text, Mei Wu is given the title Tiankong Star (Chinese: 天空星) among the deities of the Dou department (斗部). The same title is also given to Dian Tong (典通), who is listed among the thirty-six Tiangang stars (天罡星).

== Textual variants ==
The final list of deities differs between editions of Investiture of the Gods. In the received text, Mei Wu is named as the Tiankong Star in the general star roster. An early printed edition known as the Shu edition (舒本), represented by Xin ke Zhong Bojing xiansheng piping Fengshen Yanyi (Chinese: 新刻鍾伯敬先生批評封神演義), instead names Qian Jing (钱京) as the Tiankong Star in this position. The same edition also lists Dian Tong as the Tiankong Star among the thirty-six Tiangang stars.
