= Jiuding Tiesha Mountain =

Mountain and Daoist site in Liaoning, China

Jiuding Tiesha Mountain (simplified Chinese: 九鼎铁刹山; traditional Chinese: 九鼎鐵剎山; pinyin: Jiǔdǐng Tiěchā Shān), also known as Jiuding Tiesha Mountain (simplified Chinese: 九顶铁刹山; traditional Chinese: 九頂鐵剎山), is a mountain in Benxi Manchu Autonomous County, Liaoning, China. It is associated with Quanzhen Longmen Daoism and with local legends concerning the immortal Li Changmei. The mountain contains several caves, including Bagua Yunguang Cave (八宝云光洞), and numerous cliff inscriptions.

== Geography ==
Jiuding Tiesha Mountain is located in the eastern part of Benxi Manchu Autonomous County. It forms part of the Changbai mountain range. Local sources describe five principal peaks: Yuanshi Peak (元始顶), Yuhuang Peak (玉皇顶), Lingbao Peak (灵宝顶), Taishang Peak (太上顶), and Zhenwu Peak (真武顶). The name Jiuding ("Nine Peaks") is traditionally explained by the three peaks visible from each of three sides of the mountain.

The mountain has numerous caves. The best-known is Bagua Yunguang Cave, which is about 30 metres long. Eight natural stone formations inside the cave are traditionally known as the Eight Treasures of Yunguang Cave (云光洞八宝). They are identified as a stone dragon, stone tiger, stone longevity figure, stone toad, stone wooden fish, stone bed, Wind-Fixing Pearl, and stone lotus basin.

Other caves include Qiankun Cave, Tianguan Cave, Tianqiao Cave, Fengyue Cave, and Guanzu Cave. Tianqiao Cave is traditionally associated with Li Changmei, while Guanzu Cave is associated with Guo Shouzhen.

== Daoism ==
Jiuding Tiesha Mountain is associated with the history of Quanzhen Longmen Daoism. In 1630, the Longmen Daoist Guo Shouzhen came to the mountain and lived at Bagua Yunguang Cave. He remained there for more than ten years and received disciples. He established three stone halls at the cave, with the main hall dedicated to the Jade Emperor and the two side halls dedicated to Zhenwu and the Three Officials.

Guo Shouzhen also built halls near Qiankun Cave. In the early Qing dynasty, the Daoist Li Yigang established a temple dedicated to the Heavenly Official at Yulin Cave, later renamed Tianguan Cave. In 1744, the Daoist Ren Yangyue established a Sanqing Temple on the mountain as a lower temple of Yunguang Cave. A pagoda dedicated to Guo Shouzhen was later built on the mountain.

== Li Changmei ==
Local tradition associates Jiuding Tiesha Mountain with Li Changmei (长眉李大仙), a legendary Daoist immortal. Bagua Yunguang Cave is traditionally regarded as a place where he cultivated, while Tianqiao Cave is said to be where he attained immortality.

The stone bed in Yunguang Cave is traditionally said to have been where Li Changmei raised Yang Jinbao. The Wind-Fixing Pearl is also associated with him. According to local legend, King Wu of Zhou borrowed the pearl from Li Changmei during his campaign against King Zhou of Shang, and used it to defeat the Wind Roar Array.

A local inscription known as the Reinscription of the Stele Record of Great Immortal Li of the Long Eyebrows (重刊长眉李大仙碑记) records traditions concerning Li Changmei. A 2005 report on the restoration of the mountain's cliff inscriptions states that the inscription identifies Li Changmei with Du'e Zhenren Li Hui and records the story of the Wind-Fixing Pearl. The inscription was carved in the 1920s and was included in a restoration project for the mountain's cliff inscriptions.

The local tradition is also connected with Investiture of the Gods. In the novel, Du'e Zhenren lives at Bagua Yunguang Cave and possesses the Wind-Fixing Pearl. Jiang Ziya sends two men to borrow the pearl to counter the Wind Roar Array.

== Cliff inscriptions ==
Jiuding Tiesha Mountain has numerous cliff inscriptions and steles. A 2005 report described nearly 40 surviving inscriptions and steles and noted that some record aspects of the history of Longmen Daoism in northeastern China.

Among the inscriptions are Yu Tian Tong Shou (与天同寿, "May You Live as Long as Heaven"), Qiankun Zhengqi (乾坤正气, "Righteousness of Heaven and Earth"), and inscriptions naming the mountain and Yunguang Cave.

The inscriptions had suffered weathering and damage from visitors. In 2005, the Tiesha Mountain scenic-area administration raised more than 600,000 yuan for repairs. The Reinscription of the Stele Record of Great Immortal Li of the Long Eyebrows, carved in the 1920s, was among the inscriptions repaired during the project.

== Tourism ==
Jiuding Tiesha Mountain is designated as a national AAAA-rated tourist attraction.
