= Chong Yingbiao =

Character in the Chinese novel Fengshen Yanyi

Chong Yingbiao (Chinese: 崇应彪; pinyin: Chóng Yīngbiāo) is a character in the Chinese novel Investiture of the Gods (Fengshen Yanyi). He is the eldest son of Chong Houhu, the Marquis of Beibo.

== In Investiture of the Gods ==
Chong Yingbiao accompanies his father during the campaign against Su Hu. When Chong Houhu is defeated, Chong Yingbiao retreats with him and the surviving Shang forces.

When Ji Chang later attacks Chong City, Chong Houhu is in the capital and Chong Yingbiao takes command of the city. He orders his generals to prepare for battle and personally confronts the Zhou forces led by Jiang Ziya.

Chong Heihu, the younger brother of Chong Houhu, arrives at Chong City with troops to assist him. Chong Yingbiao receives him as his uncle and discusses the defense of the city with him. He also sends a memorial to the Shang court requesting assistance against Ji Chang's forces.

After Chong Heihu turns against his brother, Chong Yingbiao and Chong Houhu are defeated. Chong Yingbiao is killed during the fall of Chong City.

At the end of the novel, Jiang Ziya appoints Chong Yingbiao as one of the Nine Star Officials (九曜星官). He is listed with Gao Xiping, Han Peng, Li Ji, Wang Feng, Liu Jin, Wang Chu, Peng Jiuyuan and Li Sanyi.

== In popular culture ==
Chong Yingbiao is portrayed by Hou Wenyuan in the 2023 Chinese film Creation of the Gods I: Kingdom of Storms. The film portrays Chong Yingbiao as one of the hostage sons of the regional rulers and as a rival of Ji Fa.
