= Yellow Wind Demon =

Character in Journey to the West

- Journey to the West character
- First appearance: Chapter 20

In-universe information
- Alias: Great Sage of the Yellow Wind
- Species: Yaoguai (rat spirit)
- Weapon: Three-pronged steel fork (三股钢叉)
- Chinese name: 黄风怪
- Abode: Yellow Wind Cave, Yellow Wind Ridge (黄风岭)
- Ability: Samadhi Divine Wind (三昧神风)
- Defeated by: Lingji Bodhisattva (灵吉菩萨)

The Yellow Wind Demon (Chinese: 黄风怪; pinyin: Huáng Fēng Guài), also known as the Great Sage of the Yellow Wind (黄风大圣), is a character in the 16th-century Chinese novel Journey to the West. He is a rat spirit who rules Yellow Wind Ridge (黄风岭) and captures the monk Tang Sanzang. He is known for his Samadhi Divine Wind (三昧神风), a powerful magical wind that causes trouble for Sun Wukong.

== In Journey to the West ==
The Yellow Wind Demon first appears in Chapter 20. He was originally a rat living at the foot of Lingshan (灵山), where he had gained spiritual powers. He stole clear oil (清油) from a glazed lamp (琉璃盏) kept before the Buddha. When the lamp became dim, he feared that the Buddhist guardians would catch him, so he ran away to Yellow Wind Ridge and became a demon. The Tathagata sent Lingji Bodhisattva (灵吉菩萨) to capture him. Lingji spared his life and allowed him to return to the mountain, but ordered him not to harm living beings.

While Tang Sanzang and his disciples are travelling through Yellow Wind Ridge, the demon's follower, the Tiger Vanguard (虎先锋), captures Tang Sanzang and brings him to Yellow Wind Cave. The Yellow Wind Demon knows that Tang Sanzang is travelling to the West to obtain Buddhist scriptures. He also knows that Sun Wukong is a powerful fighter. Rather than eating the monk at once, he orders his followers to tie him to a post in the back garden. He plans to wait three to five days until Wukong and Zhu Bajie stop looking for their master.

After the Tiger Vanguard is killed, the Yellow Wind Demon comes out of his cave to fight Wukong. He carries a three-pronged steel fork (三股钢叉). The two fight for about thirty rounds without either side winning. Wukong then uses his magic to make many copies of himself from his hairs. The demon responds by blowing his Samadhi Divine Wind (三昧神风). The wind throws Wukong's copies around and fills the sky with yellow sand. When the demon blows the wind directly into Wukong's face, Wukong cannot open his Fiery Golden Eyes (火眼金睛) and has to retreat.

Wukong and Bajie later find a house where an old man gives Wukong an eye medicine called Three-Flower Nine-Seed Ointment (三花九子膏). The medicine heals his eyes overnight. The house then disappears, and Wukong learns that it was made by a Dharma-protecting Jialan who was helping the pilgrims. Wukong returns to the demon's cave and secretly listens to his followers. He learns that the demon fears only Lingji Bodhisattva. Wukong then meets an old man who tells him where to find Lingji on Little Mount Sumeru (小须弥山). The old man is revealed to be Taibai Jinxing.

Lingji tells Wukong that the Tathagata had given him a Wind-Calming Pill (定风丹) and a Flying Dragon Staff (飞龙宝杖) to control the Yellow Wind Demon. He agrees to help Wukong and follows him back to the cave. When the demon comes out to fight again and prepares to use his wind, Lingji throws the Flying Dragon Staff from the clouds. The staff turns into an eight-clawed golden dragon and catches the demon. The demon then returns to his original form, a yellow-furred marten-like rat (黄毛貂鼠). Wukong tries to kill him, but Lingji stops him and takes him back to Lingshan to answer for his crimes. Wukong and Bajie then enter the cave and rescue Tang Sanzang.

The Samadhi Divine Wind is described in Chapter 21 as strong enough to shake mountains, darken the sky, and disturb gods and other heavenly beings. It raises huge clouds of yellow sand, shakes the rivers, and causes trouble across the heavens and the human world. Even Wukong cannot withstand it during their first fight.

== Interpretations ==
The Yellow Wind Demon represents "false earth" (假土) in the novel's Five Elements (五行) symbolism, while Sha Seng represents "true earth" (真土). Yellow is linked to the earth element in Chinese tradition. Xu Chuanwu cites an earlier commentary which explains that the Yellow Wind Demon appears before Sha Seng to show the difference between false and true earth.

Liu Tingqian argues that the novel criticizes the Tathagata for allowing demons to harm people. He uses the Yellow Wind Demon and the Great Peng as examples, since both have links to the Buddha. Liu also argues that demons from the Buddhist and heavenly worlds are often more powerful and cause more harm than ordinary earthly monsters.

Yang Yi also points to the Yellow Wind Demon as one of several monsters with ties to Buddhist figures. Other examples include the Great Peng, the Yellow Brows Demon, and animals belonging to Buddhist deities. He argues that these characters call into question the image of Buddhist gods and bodhisattvas as wholly good.

The demon's Samadhi Divine Wind has been compared to a dust storm. Its description in the novel includes yellow sand filling the sky, strong winds shaking mountains, and Sun Wukong being unable to open his eyes.

== In modern media ==
The Yellow Wind Demon appears as the Yellow Wind Sage (黄风大圣) in the 2024 video game Black Myth: Wukong. He helps the people of the Kingdom of Sahali defeat a giant insect demon named Fuban (蝜蝂) before returning to Yellow Wind Ridge. He later obtains one of Sun Wukong's six relics, the Fuming Ears (耳听怒), but cannot refine it because his powers are too weak. He turns to evil practices, cuts off Lingji Bodhisattva's head, and uses it to hold the relic.

The game's second chapter contrasts the Sage's good and evil actions. Its closing narration says that "one thought of good" (一念善) can lead him to defeat demons and save people, while "one thought of evil" (一念恶) can bring suffering to living beings.

The Sage's theft of Lingji Bodhisattva's head led to comparisons with the looting of Chinese cultural objects by foreign powers during the late Qing dynasty. Some players believed that the headless Bodhisattva represented Buddhist statues whose heads had been removed and taken overseas. Some players also linked the Yellow Wind Sage, a rat demon, to the Chinese idiom shǔqiègǒudào (鼠窃狗盗; "petty theft like rat and dog"), comparing his theft of Lingji's head to the stealing of Chinese cultural objects.
