= Lingbao Dafashi =

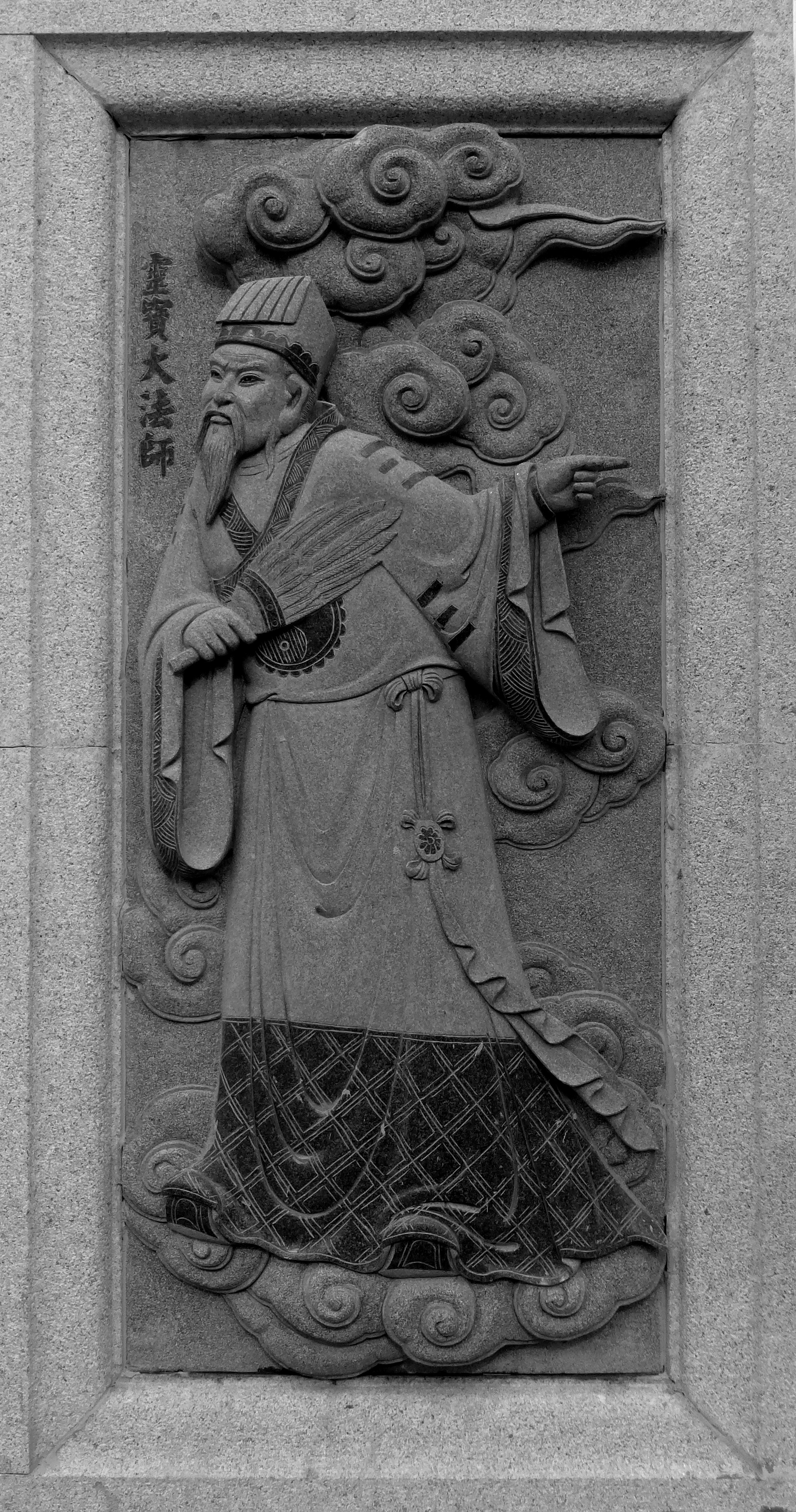
Relief of Lingbao Dafashi at Ping Sien Si Temple, Malaysia

Lingbao Dafashi (simplified Chinese: 灵宝大法师; traditional Chinese: 靈寶大法師; pinyin: Língbǎo Dàfǎshī) is a Taoist immortal in the 16th-century Chinese mythological novel Investiture of the Gods (Fengshen Yanyi). In the novel, he is one of the Twelve Golden Immortals of the Chan Sect (闡教) under the tutelage of Yuanshi Tianzun.

== In Investiture of the Gods ==
In the novel, Lingbao Dafashi lives in Yuanyang Cave (元陽洞) on Mount Kongtong (崆峒山). He is one of the Twelve Golden Immortals and a disciple of Yuanshi Tianzun. Unlike some of the other immortals, he has no named disciples or prominent magical treasures, and he has only a limited role in the story. Most of his appearances are alongside the other Chan Sect immortals during the Zhou campaign against the Shang dynasty.

In Chapter 45, during the battle against the Ten Extreme Arrays (十絕陣), the Zhou forces are unable to break the Wind Roar Array (風吼陣). Lingbao Dafashi tells the other immortals that his friend Du'e Zhenren (度厄真人) possesses the Wind-Calming Pearl (定風珠), a treasure capable of overcoming the formation. On his recommendation, Randeng Daoren sends messengers to borrow the pearl from Du'e Zhenren. After the pearl is brought back, the Chan Sect uses it to break the Wind Roar Array and continue the campaign against the Shang forces.

== Origin ==
Some accounts say that Lingbao Dafashi is Lingbao Tianzun in human form. Lingbao Tianzun is one of the Three Pure Ones in Daoism. But Fengshen Yanyi does not say that the two are the same god. In the novel, Lingbao Dafashi is a disciple of Yuanshi Tianzun.

== Interpretations ==
Lingbao Dafashi's name is close to that of Lingbao Tianzun, one of the Three Pure Ones in Daoism. But in Fengshen Yanyi, Lingbao Dafashi is only a disciple of Yuanshi Tianzun. Gao Zhenhong believes that his name may have come from the Lingbao scriptures or local Daoist beliefs. Gao also suggests that Tongtian Jiaozhu, the leader of the Jie Sect, was based on Lingbao Tianzun. He argues that the novel did not always follow the usual ranks of Daoist gods.

== In popular belief ==
The name "Lingbao Dafashi" also appears in the history of the Heavenly Gate Society (天门会), an armed peasant group in Henan during the 1920s. In 1926, its leader Han Genzi (韩根子), also known as Han Yuming (韩欲明), claimed that a god had told him in a dream to look for a treasure in the mountains. He said he found a seal inside a large stone on Huanghua Mountain. The seal bore the words "Lingbao Dafashi" (灵宝大法师). Han told his followers that the seal was a gift from Heaven and a sign that he had been chosen to lead them. The story helped him gain followers. The society grew into a large armed group that fought bandits and warlord armies.

The name was also used in Daoist rituals. The Ming dynasty text Shangqing Lingbao Jidu Dacheng Jinshu (上清灵宝济度大成金书) lists a ritual seal called the "Seal of Lingbao Dafashi" (灵宝大法师印). Daoist priests used this seal to stamp papers during religious ceremonies. They believed it helped send their prayers and messages to the gods.

== Temple ==
At the Qingyang Palace (青羊宫), one of the oldest Taoist temples in Chengdu, Sichuan, Lingbao Dafashi is enshrined in the Sanqing Hall (三清殿). The hall's main altar is dedicated to the Three Pure Ones and is flanked by statues of the Twelve Golden Immortals, including Lingbao Dafashi.

== See also ==
- Investiture of the Gods
- Lingbao Tianzun
