= Du'e Zhenren =

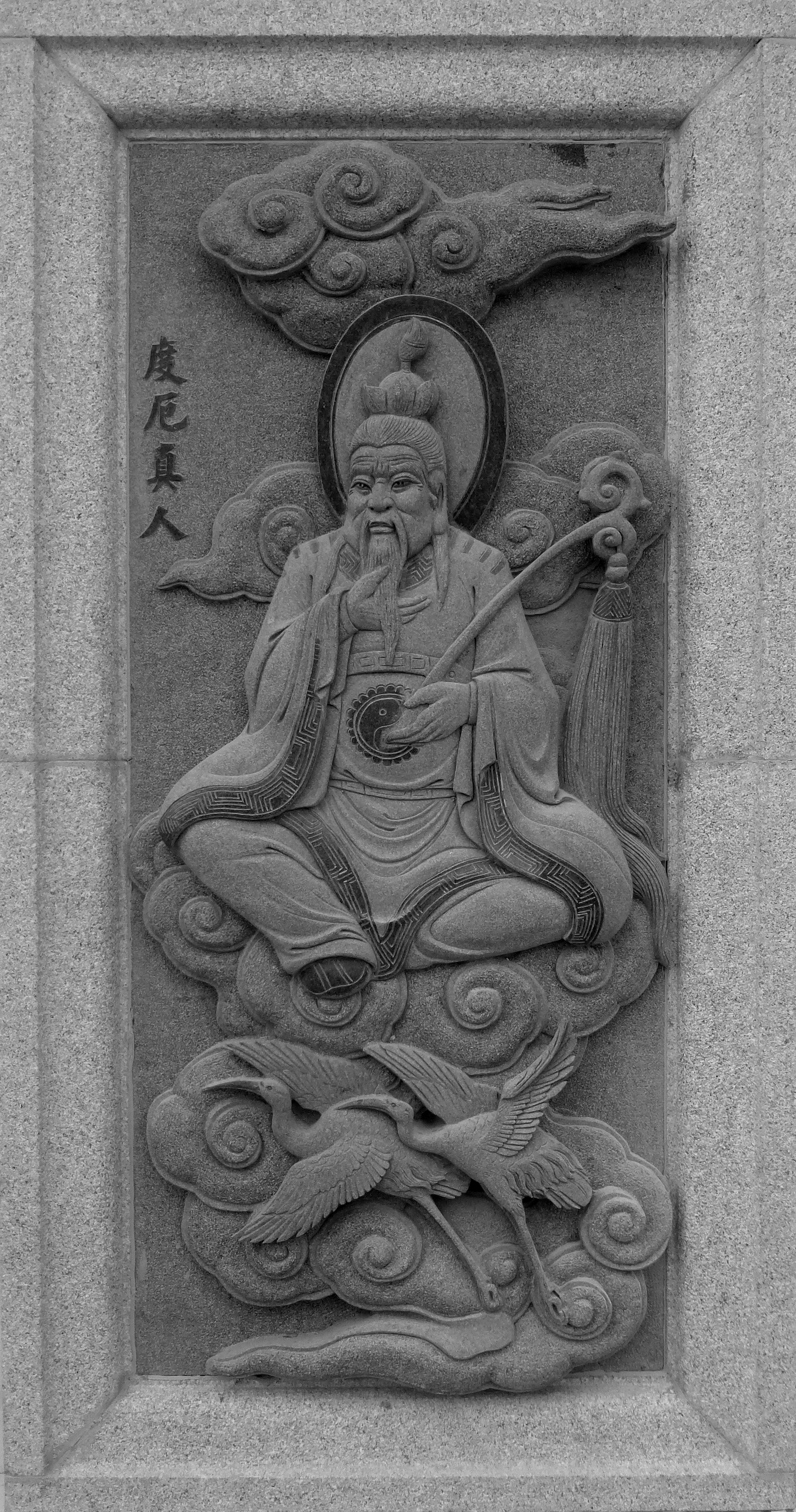
Relief of Du'e Zhenren at Ping Sien Si Temple, Malaysia

Du'e Zhenren (Chinese: 度厄真人; pinyin: Dù'è Zhēnrén) is a Daoist immortal in the Chinese novel Investiture of the Gods (Fengshen Yanyi). He is an independent immortal (散仙) who lives in Babao Yunguang Cave (八宝云光洞) on Jiuding Tiecha Mountain (九鼎铁叉山). He is the teacher of two generals, Li Jing and Zheng Lun, and owns the Wind-Calming Pearl (定风珠).

== In Fengshen Yanyi ==
Du'e Zhenren is the teacher of Li Jing and Zheng Lun (郑伦). Li Jing studied under him in the Western Kunlun Mountains and learned the Five Elements Escape Arts (五行遁术). As Li Jing could not become an immortal, Du'e sent him down the mountain to serve King Zhou of Shang. Li Jing later became the military commander at Chentang Pass and the father of Nezha.

Zheng Lun also learned magic from Du'e Zhenren. Du'e knew that Zheng Lun's name was on the list of gods and taught him the "Two Breaths in the Aperture" (窍中二气). Zheng Lun could make a loud sound through his nose and release two streams of white light that captured an enemy's soul. Du'e then sent him to serve in Jizhou. Zheng Lun first fought for the Shang side but later joined the Zhou army.

Du'e Zhenren also helps Jiang Ziya in the war against Shang. When the Zhou army faces the Ten Absolutes Array (十绝阵), the immortals cannot break the Wind Roar Array (风吼阵). Its black winds carry thousands of magical blades. Lingbao Dafashi tells Jiang Ziya that Du'e has a Wind-Calming Pearl (定风珠) which can stop the winds. Jiang sends San Yisheng and Chao Tian to borrow it from Du'e at Eight Treasures Cloudlight Cave on Jiuding Tiecha Mountain. Du'e agrees and gives them the pearl. The pearl is later used by Cihang Daoren to stop the winds. Cihang then breaks the array and defeats its master, Dong Quan.

== Local folklore and origin ==
In local stories from Jiuding Tiesha Mountain near Benxi, Liaoning, Du'e Zhenren is identified with Long-Browed Immortal Li (长眉李大仙), also called Li Hui (李辉). He is said to have practised Daoism at Babao Yunguang Cave (八宝云光洞). The cave has eight natural rock formations. One is a round stone called the Wind-Calming Pearl (定风珠). According to local legend, King Wu's men borrowed the pearl from Li Hui to break the Wind Roar Array during the war against Shang.

The mountain also has a large stone inscription called Reinscription of the Stele Record of Long-Browed Immortal Li (重刊长眉李大仙碑记). It names Li Hui as Du'e Zhenren and tells the story of the Wind-Calming Pearl. The inscription was carved in the 1920s and was restored in 2005.

Du'e Zhenren's Wind-Calming Pearl (定风珠) is similar to the Wind-Calming Pill (定风丹) used by Lingji Bodhisattva in Journey to the West. In Investiture of the Gods, Du'e lends his pearl to help break the Wind Roar Array. Lingji gives Sun Wukong the Wind-Calming Pill to protect him from Princess Iron Fan's magical fan. Journey to the West and Investiture of the Gods contain similar stories and descriptions. Scholars disagree about which novel borrowed from the other. In 1984, Huang Yongnian argued that Investiture of the Gods borrowed from Journey to the West. Zhu Hongbo discussed the question again in 2019, explaining why it is difficult to tell which novel came first.

== Modern adaptations ==
In the web novel Du'e Xiaoyao Xian (度厄逍遥仙) by w Fengxue (w风雪), Du'e Zhenren and Lingji Bodhisattva are two identities of the same character, Li Xiaofeng (李笑风). The story follows him through a world of gods and immortals drawn from Chinese mythology.

Another web novel, Honghuang zhi Lingji Pusa (洪荒之灵吉菩萨), by Yimei Xianren (一眉仙人), also treats Du'e Zhenren as an earlier identity of Lingji Bodhisattva. Its main character travels back to the Shang dynasty and takes the place of Du'e Zhenren.
