= Chong Heihu =

Character in Fengshen Yanyi

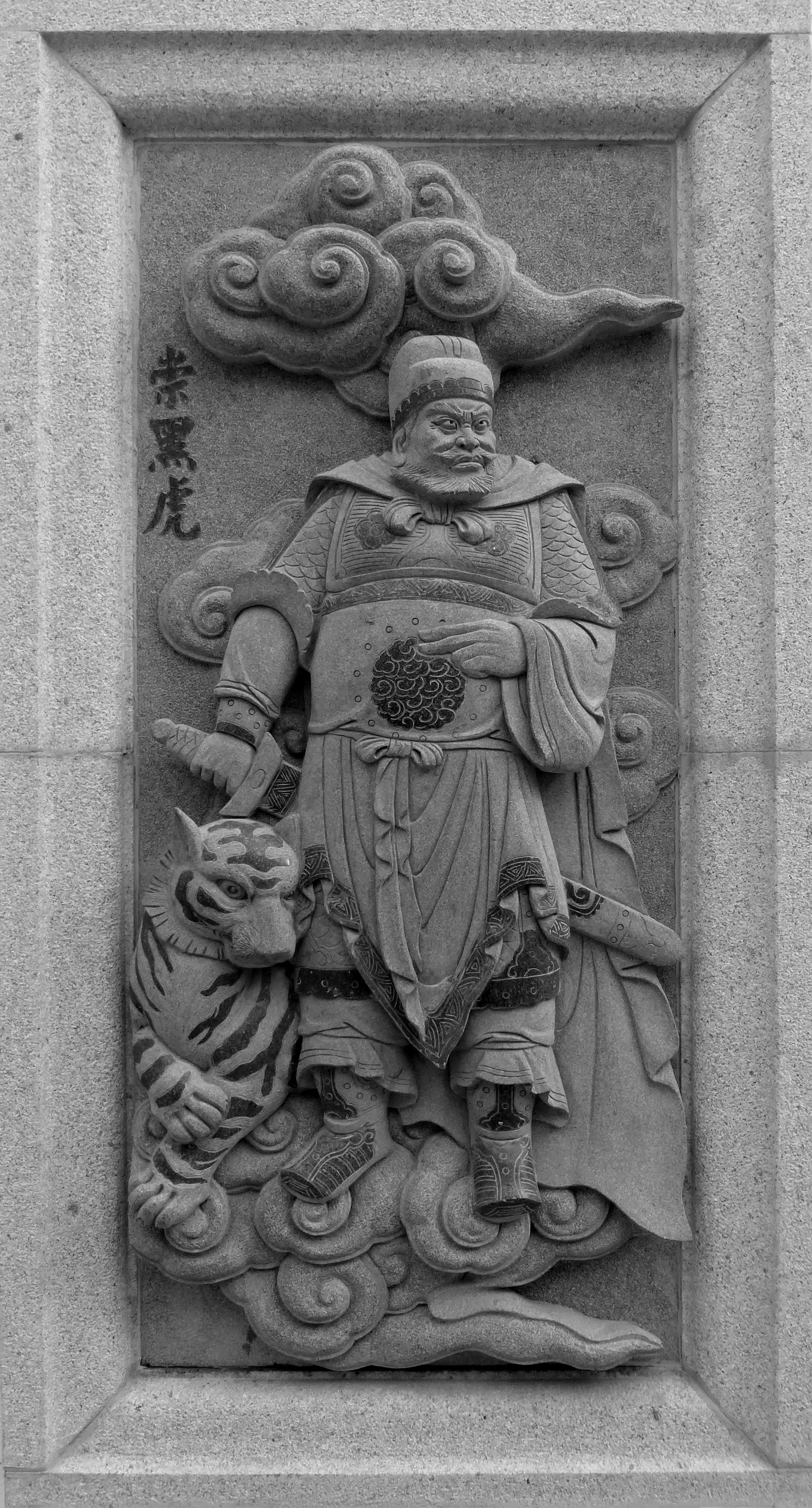
Chong Heihu

Chong Heihu (Chinese: 崇黑虎; pinyin: Chóng Hēihǔ) is a character in the classic 16th-century Chinese novel Fengshen Yanyi. He is the younger brother of Chong Houhu, the Grand Duke of the North.

== In Fengshen Yanyi ==
Chong Heihu is described as having a dark complexion, a long red beard, and eyes like golden bells. He wears a nine-cloud flaming crown, a red robe, chain armor, and a jade belt, and rides a Fire-Eyed Golden-Furred Beast. His weapons are a pair of golden axes. He also carries a red gourd containing Iron-Beaked Divine Eagles (鐵嘴神鷹).

Chong Heihu comes from Caozhou with 3,000 Flying Tiger soldiers to assist his elder brother Chong Houhu during the campaign against Su Hu at Jizhou. He meets Su Hu's son Su Quanzhong, who challenges him to battle. After seeing Quanzhong's skill with the spear, Chong Heihu retreats and is pursued by him. Chong Heihu opens his red gourd and releases an Iron-Beaked Divine Eagle, which attacks Quanzhong's horse and allows Chong Heihu to capture him.

The novel states that Chong Heihu had studied under an immortal of the Jie sect when he was young and received the red gourd and its divine eagles. He later uses the eagles again during the fighting against Gao Jiying's poisonous insects.

Zheng Lun, a general serving Su Hu, later challenges Chong Heihu. Zheng Lun uses his supernatural ability to emit sound from his nostrils and knocks Chong Heihu unconscious. Chong Heihu is captured and brought before Su Hu, who releases him. The two men drink together, and Chong Heihu subsequently returns to Caozhou after Su Hu agrees to end the conflict at the request of Ji Chang.

Chong Heihu later joins the Zhou campaign against the Shang. During the fighting at Chongcheng, he fights Nangong Shi and tells him that he intends to have Chong Houhu brought to the Zhou camp. After Chong Houhu is captured, Chong Heihu presents his brother to Ji Chang.

Chong Heihu later serves among the generals associated with the Five Mountains. During the fighting against Gao Jiying, he uses his divine eagles against the poisonous insects released by Gao Jiying.

During the Battle of Mianchi, Chong Heihu fights the Shang general Zhang Kui together with Huang Feihu, Wenpin, Cui Ying, and Jiang Xiong. Zhang Kui kills all five generals in the battle.

At the end of the novel, Jiang Ziya appoints Chong Heihu Nanyue Hengshan Sitian Zhaosheng Dadi (南岳衡山司天昭圣大帝), the deity of the Southern Peak, one of the Five Great Mountain Emperors.

== Worship ==
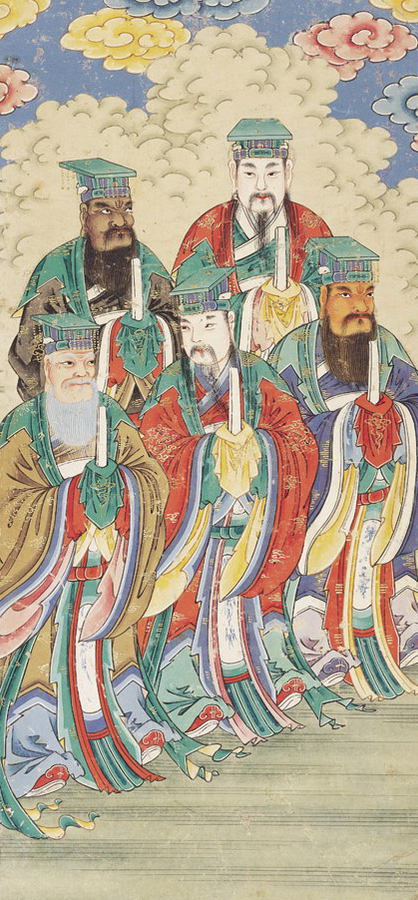
The Five Mountain Emperors

Chong Heihu is identified with Nanyue Dadi (南岳大帝), the god of the Southern Sacred Mountain, in Investiture of the Gods and some Chinese folk traditions. Other Daoist traditions give different names for this god.

The 16th day of the twelfth lunar month is recorded as Nanyue Dadi's birthday. A local history of Rongchang also records a Nanyue Temple at Banqiao, where Chong Heihu was worshipped and a temple fair was held on that day.

In Danyang, Jiangsu, Huadian Temple (华甸庙) is traditionally said to have been Chong Heihu's Qishan Xinggong (祁山行宫). The temple is mainly dedicated to Zhang Bo (张渤), another Daoist god.

At the Five Mountains Temple in Kinmen, Taiwan, Chong Heihu is worshipped as one of the Five Mountain Emperors, together with Huang Feihu, Wenpin, Cui Ying, and Jiang Xiong.

== In popular culture ==
Chong Heihu is represented in the traditional opera repertoire, including Sishuiguan. A book on Chinese opera face painting records a style of paper-cutting from Yuxian County based on Chong Heihu's facial makeup in Sishuiguan.

His story is also depicted in the Yiqiang Sangsidiao opera.
