= Li Changmei =

Legendary Daoist immortal in Chinese folklore

Li Changmei (simplified Chinese: 长眉李大仙; traditional Chinese: 長眉李大仙; pinyin: Chángméi Lǐ Dàxiān; lit. 'Great Immortal Li of the Long Eyebrows'), also known as Changmei Li Daxian, is a legendary Daoist immortal in Chinese folklore. According to local tradition, he practised Daoism at Babao Yunguang Cave (八宝云光洞) on Jiuding Tiesha Mountain in Benxi, Liaoning, China.

In local stories, his personal name is Li Hui (李辉), and his courtesy name is Changgeng (长庚). These stories identify him as Du'e Zhenren (度厄真人), an immortal who appears in the Ming dynasty novel Investiture of the Gods.

== Legends ==
=== Jiuding Tiesha Mountain ===
According to local tradition, Li Changmei practised Daoism and became an immortal at Jiuding Tiesha Mountain. Babao Yunguang Cave is said to be the place where he practised Daoism.

The cave contains eight natural stone formations called the Eight Treasures. They are a stone dragon, tiger, toad, wooden fish, lotus basin, longevity figure, bed and Wind-Fixing Pearl (定风珠).

Another cave on the mountain, Tianqiao Cave (天桥洞), is said to be the place where Li Changmei became an immortal.

=== The Wind-Fixing Pearl ===
A local legend says that the forces of King Wu of Zhou borrowed the Wind-Fixing Pearl from Li Changmei during their war against King Zhou of Shang. They used the pearl to break the Wind Roar Array (风吼阵).

The Wind-Fixing Pearl also appears in Chapter 45 of Investiture of the Gods. In the novel, Lingbao Dafa Shi tells Jiang Ziya that Du'e Zhenren has a Wind-Fixing Pearl at Jiuding Tiecha Mountain's Yunguang Cave. Jiang Ziya sends San Yisheng and Chao Tian to borrow the pearl. Du'e Zhenren agrees and gives them the pearl.

=== Yang family legends ===
Li Changmei also appears in local stories about the Generals of the Yang Family. According to one story, Yang Jinbao (杨金豹) became his pupil at Jiuding Tiesha Mountain. The stone bed in Yunguang Cave is said to be the place where Li Changmei took Yang Jinbao as his pupil.

The novel Jinling Fu (金陵府) also tells of Yang Jinbao going up the mountain to study.

== Stone inscriptions ==
Jiuding Tiesha Mountain has a cliff inscription called the Reinscription of the Stele Record of Great Immortal Li of the Long Eyebrows (重刊长眉李大仙碑记). It identifies Li Changmei as Du'e Zhenren, also called Li Hui, and tells the story of the Wind-Fixing Pearl.

The inscription was carved in the 1920s. In September 2005, Liaoshen Evening News reported that the Tiesha Mountain scenic-area administration had restored the inscription.

== See also ==
- Du'e Zhenren
- Jiuding Tiesha Mountain
- Generals of the Yang Family
