= Zheng Lun =

Character in the Investiture of the Gods

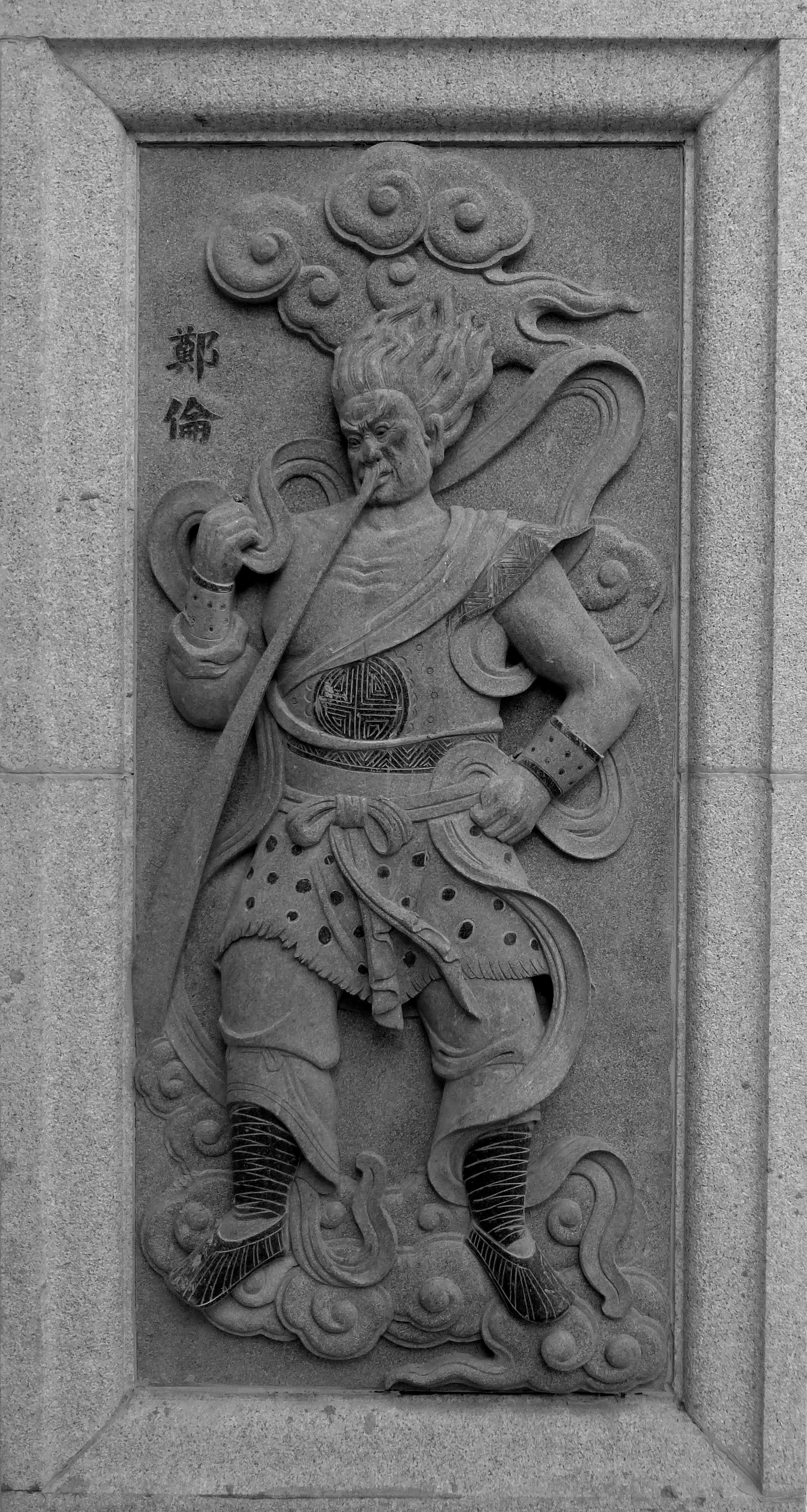
A depiction of Zheng Lun at Ping Sien Si

Zheng Lun (Chinese: 鄭倫; pinyin: Zhèng Lún) is a character in the Chinese novel Investiture of the Gods (Fengshen Yanyi). He is a disciple of Du'e Zhenren and a military officer serving Su Hu, the ruler of Jizhou.

== In Investiture of the Gods ==
Zheng Lun is introduced as a disciple of Du'e Zhenren of the Western Kunlun Mountains. Du'e Zhenren teaches him a supernatural technique known as the "two qi within the aperture" (竅中二氣). By exhaling through his nose, Zheng Lun can produce a sound like a bell and emit two streams of white light that capture an opponent's spirit.

Zheng Lun serves as a grain officer under Su Hu and commands three thousand soldiers known as the Black Crow Troops (乌鸦兵). During the campaign against Su Hu, he confronts Chong Heihu. Zheng Lun uses his ability to capture Chong Heihu's spirit and takes him prisoner.

Later, after Su Hu decides to submit to the Zhou cause, Zheng Lun refuses to follow him. He argues that Su Hu owes loyalty to the Shang dynasty and declares that he would rather die than abandon his allegiance. Zheng Lun subsequently continues fighting for the Shang.

Zheng Lun is eventually captured by the Zhou forces and later returns to battle on behalf of the Shang. He is killed by the Shang general Jin Dasheng.

At the end of the novel, Jiang Ziya assigns Zheng Lun and Chen Qi to serve as the Heng-Ha Erjiang (哼哈二将), a pair of guardians associated with the protection of the Buddhist or Daoist gate.

== Religious tradition ==
The Heng-Ha Generals (哼哈二将) are also known as guardians of Chinese Buddhist temples. Zheng Lun is the Heng General (哼将), while Chen Qi is the Ha General (哈将). They are linked to the older Buddhist tradition of vajra guardians. Their names come from Investiture of the Gods.

At Ciyun Temple in Zhaoqing, Guangdong, statues of the two generals stand outside the Wanfo Tower. The Heng General is identified as Zheng Lun, and the Ha General as Chen Qi.
