= Marquess Hu of Chong =

Shang Dynasty marquis

Hu, Marquess of Chong 崇侯虎
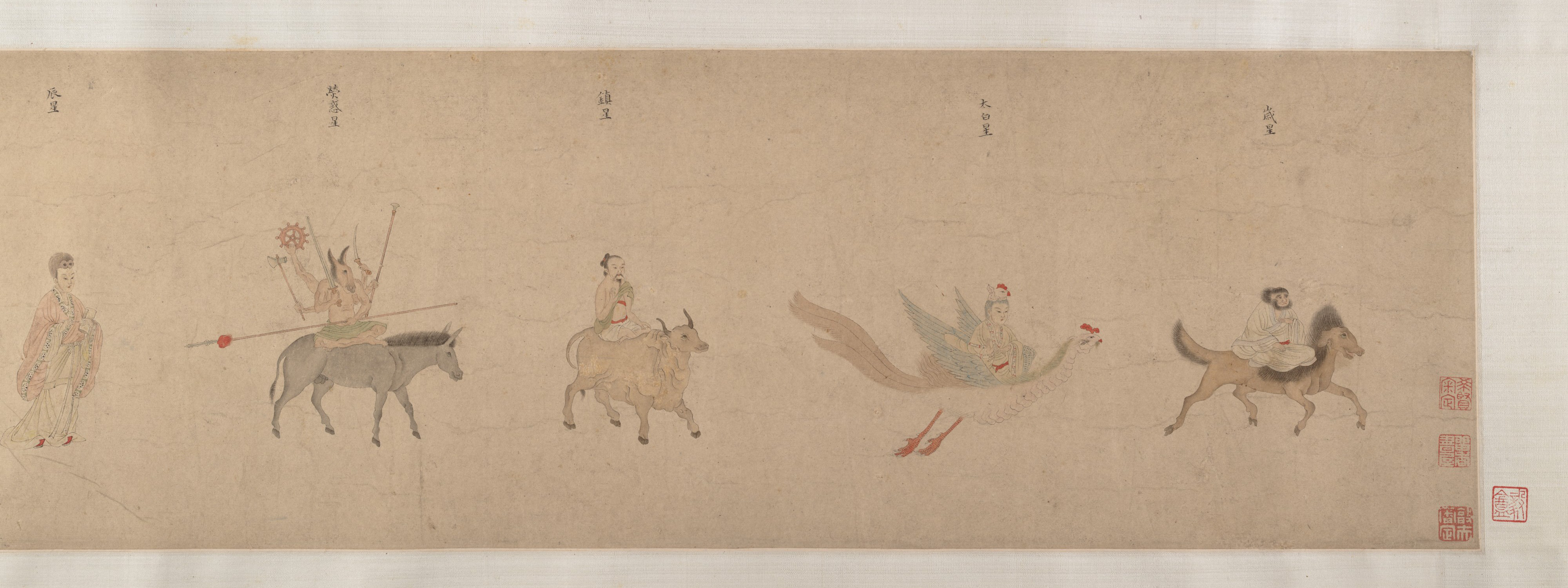

Marquess of Chong
- Reign: ? - c. 1046-1051 BCE (Note: Sometime before the Battle of Muye whilst King Wen was still alive.)
- Died: c. 1046-1051 BCE; State of Chong
- Issue: Chong Heihu (fictional); Chong Yingbiao (fictional)
Names
- Given name: Hu (虎)

Marquess Hu of Chong (Chinese: 崇侯虎; pinyin: Chóng Hóu Hǔ), also written as Chong Houhu, (Note: In Fengshen Yanyi, Chong Houhu is a person's name, in which Chong is the family name and Houhu is the given name.) was a politician allied with Di Xin during the Late Shang dynasty. His betrayal of King Wen of Zhou led him to become character featured within the Chinese novel Fengshen Yanyi.

== As a historical figure ==
Marquess Hu of Chong, King Wen of Zhou, and the Marquis of E were three vassal states to the Shang dynasty, forming a defensive rear to the south of Yin. He was known for his strength. The existence of the vassal states allowed Di Xin to repeatedly go to war with various states, particularly in the Dongyi region, without risk of an attack from behind. In return, they would receive the benefit of Shang hegemony.

However, Di Xin reportedly became more fixated with lust and alcohol, and increasingly incompetent as a ruler. This motivated King Wen of Zhou to betray Di Xin by cultivating his innate, moral faculty by picking off weaker ally tribes, or rallying them himself. Marquess Hu heard of this, and told Di Xin, leading to the imprisonment of King Wen and deteriorated relations with Predynastic Zhou. Han dynasty scholar Han Fei identifies this as the fatal mistake that would bring down the Shang dynasty.

Shuo Yuan provides an anecdote of King Wen accusing Marquess Hu of disrespecting his father and brothers, lacking filial piety, giving unjust judgements, and leading an economically unequal society. He therefore wanted to go to war, but with emphasis on leaving civilians alone, and not blocking wells or killing livestock. Upon hearing of this, the State of Chong surrendered.

=== In oracle bones ===
Several oracle bones mention an Earl of Chong (虫伯), which has been thought to be homophonous with the state name. Zhengzhang reconstructs chóng 虫 as /*l'uŋ/, and chóng 崇 as /*zruŋ/, showing a close connection.

An individual named Marquess Hu of Chong is mentioned in oracle bones, with the state written as cóng 琮, which has been connected with the same state and is near-homophonous in Old Chinese. However, while this did reveal a close military connection, this individual dates to the era of Wu Ding, not Di Xin.

== In Fengshen Yanyi ==
In Fengshen Yanyi, Chong Houhu is a high-ranking official of the Shang Dynasty—he is one of four Grand Dukes. After the four Grand Dukes had been invited to a banquet by King Zhou himself, Chong Houhu would be the primary defense of the king's edict to capture the "rebel" Su Hu, who had originally written harsh words about the king on the Noon Gate—words that reflected truth however. Chong Houhu assures his utmost loyalty to the king and thus heads his army of 50,000 soldiers out of the Zhaoge capital to capture Su Hu from his Ji province. It had been said that the Chong Houhu's soldiers looked live rolling waves constantly emerging from the earth with murderous intent. After ten miles of traveling on horseback, scouts had reported to Chong Houhu that soldiers had effectively made it within Ji province; thus the duke makes camp.

After Su Hu heard of this and sat atop the city gate as to see before him Chong Houhu's army, Chong Houhu presented himself. As seen, the Chong Houhu whore a large bright red robe around his body with a jade belt, golden armor, and a large Flying Phoenix Helmet. While sitting atop a fat purple horse, a large broad knife could be seen resting on Chong Houhu's waist. After the duke then ordered the immediate capture of Su Hu, Mei Wu, the greatest general under Chong Houhu ran out and was met by Total Loyal and was soon killed. After a battle ensued following this, the duke retreated and hid in a small forest for rest at night. After Su Hu then ordered his soldiers to launch a night raid on the duke, complete chaos ensued and the duke himself would have lost his life if it had not been for the quick appearance of Chong Yingbiao, Jin Kuai, and Huang Yuanji. After the Chong Houhu, his son Chong Yingbiao, and other remnants fled on horse amongst the burning flames of their supplies, the duke uttered the words, "Ever since I have led an army, I have never suffered such defeat. How are we to take revenge? Moreover, I think the Grand Duke of the West is disobeying the king in not sending his troops, but sitting pretty to see who may win. Oh, how I hate that fox!" After Chong Houhu then decided to regroup in the morning, Total Loyal could be seen standing atop a mountain in the moonlight charging down upon the duke. After a battle ensues, Chong Houhu ends up having his left arm pierced by Total Loyal's spear; thus almost falling from his horse. Eventually, after the battle rages on for many days upon days following this event, the Grand Duke of the West sends a letter to Su Hu which results in Su Hu's consent, and the stopping of the conflict. Thus, Chong Heihu, and the Grand Duke of the West completely shun the Chong Houhu for his idiotic impulsive ways. After the duke returns to the capital with his remaining men, he asks pardon from King Zhou. Following the Jiang Ziya arc, Chong Houhu would be responsible for creating the Deer Gallery, and would thus starve the populace even further.

Chong Houhu was appointed as the deity of Dahao Star (Great Consumption Star, 大耗星) in the end.

== See also ==
- Gun, Earl of Chong
