= Chinese Academy of History =

- 中国历史研究院
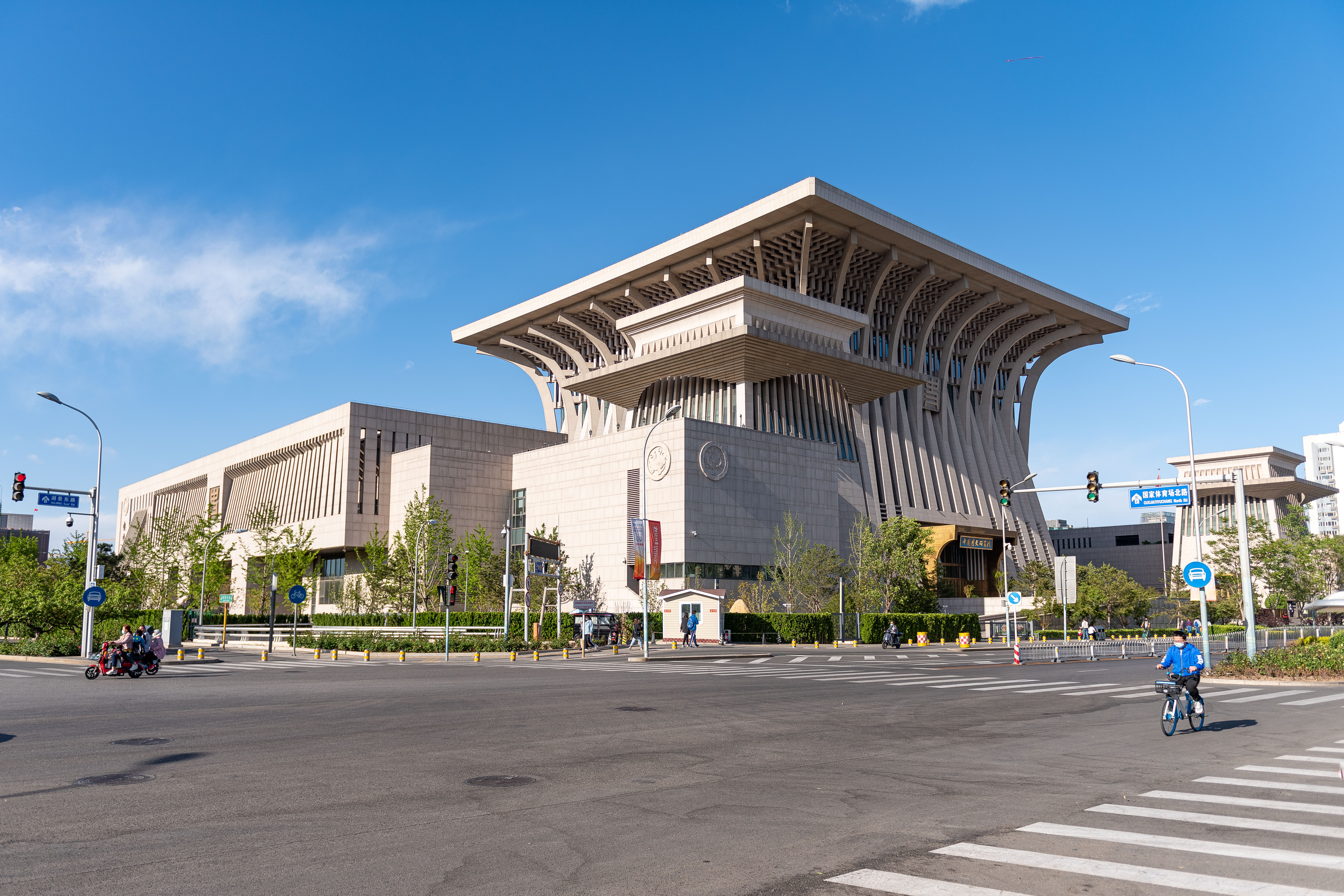
- Headquarters
- Formation: January 3, 2019; 7 years ago
- Type: National-level academic research institution on history
- Headquarters: China National Studies Center, No. 1 National Stadium North Road, Olympic Park, Chaoyang District, Beijing
- Director: Gao Xiang
- Parent organization: Chinese Academy of Social Sciences
- Website: cah.cass.cn

Chinese Academy of History
- Simplified Chinese: 中国历史研究院
- Traditional Chinese: 中國歷史研究院
Transcriptions
Standard Mandarin
- Hanyu Pinyin: Zhōngguó Lìshǐ Yánjiùyuàn

The Chinese Academy of History is a history research institution founded in 2019 and is affiliated to the Chinese Academy of Social Sciences.

== History ==
On January 3, 2019, with the approval of the Central Committee of the Chinese Communist Party, the Institute of History Theory was established under the Academic Division of History of the Chinese Academy of Social Sciences. The Institute of History was renamed the Institute of History. At the same time, the Chinese Academy of History (vice-ministerial level) was established based on the Academic Division of History. It consists of the Institute of Archaeology, the Institute of History, the Institute of Modern History, the Institute of World History, the Institute of Chinese Border Studies, and the Institute of History Theory (all of which are additional titles). It is responsible for coordinating and guiding the national historical research work and formulating research plans. CCP General Secretary Xi Jinping sent a congratulatory letter to congratulate the establishment of the Chinese Academy of History. On the same day, Publicity Department Head Huang Kunming unveiled the Chinese Academy of History at the Chinese National Studies Center in Chaoyang District, Beijing.

In June 2019, the Chinese Academy of History launched its official Weibo account. On June 3, 2019, the Chinese Academy of History and the Macau University of Science and Technology signed a cooperation agreement to jointly establish the Macau History Research Center of the Chinese Academy of History.

In May 2022, the new three-determination plan of the Chinese Academy of Social Sciences was announced, which clearly stated that it is a ministerial-level institution directly under the State Council, and the Chinese Academy of History is the history department of the academy.

On the eve of the 20th CCP National Congress, the Chinese Academy of History published a series of articles that evaluated the Haijin, the Boxer Rebellion, class struggle and Down to the Countryside Movement positively.

== Structure ==
The Chinese Academy of History has the following institutions:

=== Internal organization ===
- General Office
- Research and Inspection Office
- Personnel Department (Party Committee Office, Discipline Inspection Commission Office)
- Finance and Assets Division
- Security Department
- Logistics and Service Department
- Special work department
- Research Planning Office
- Results Evaluation Office
- Cooperation and Exchange Office
- Library and Archives
- Museum
- Information Office
- Historical Research Magazine
- History and Culture Communication Center

=== Directly affiliated institutions ===
- Institute of Archaeology, Chinese Academy of Social Sciences
- Institute of Ancient History, Chinese Academy of Social Sciences
- Institute of Modern History, Chinese Academy of Social Sciences
- Institute of World History, Chinese Academy of Social Sciences
- Institute of China Borderland Studies, Chinese Academy of Social Sciences
- Institute of Historical Theory, Chinese Academy of Social Sciences
