= Su Hu =

Character in Fengshen Yanyi

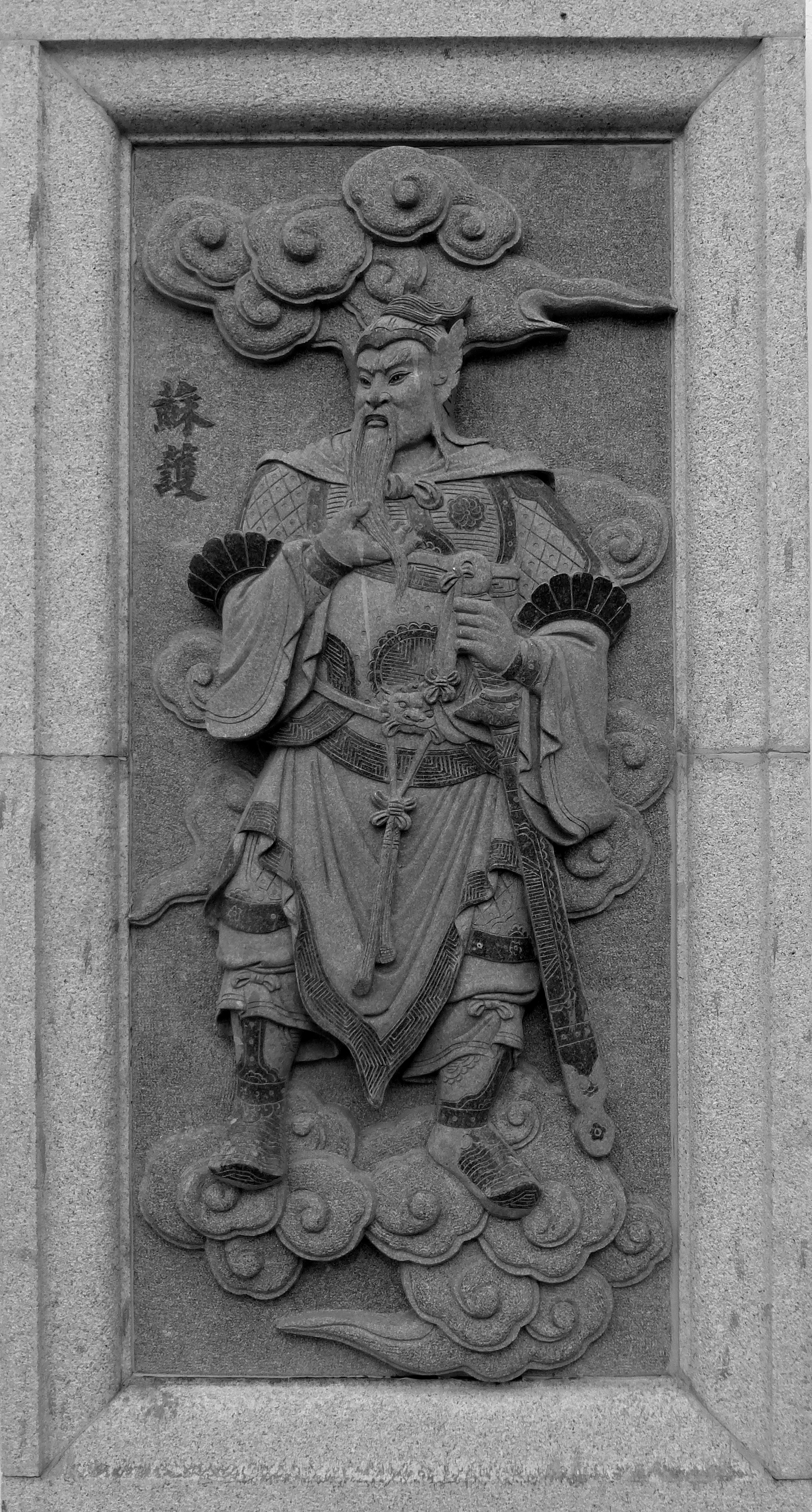
Su Hu

Su Hu (蘇護) is a character in the 16th-century Chinese novel Fengshen Yanyi. He is the marquis of Jizhou and a general serving Di Xin, the last king of the Shang dynasty. He is the father of Su Quanzhong and Su Daji. In the novel, he rebels against Di Xin but later agrees to send Daji to the royal court to end the conflict.

== Origin ==
Su Hu is a fictional character based on later stories about Daji and the fall of the Shang dynasty. The Guoyu records that Di Xin attacked the Yousu clan, which then gave him Daji. The Records of the Grand Historian also describes Daji as a favorite of Di Xin. Neither work names her father or brother. The names Su Hu and Su Quanzhong appear in later fiction, including Fengshen Yanyi.

In Wen County, Henan, local tradition identifies a burial mound as the grave of Su Hu and his son Su Quanzhong. This belief is based on old county records and folklore rather than historical evidence of their existence.

== Role in Fengshen Yanyi ==
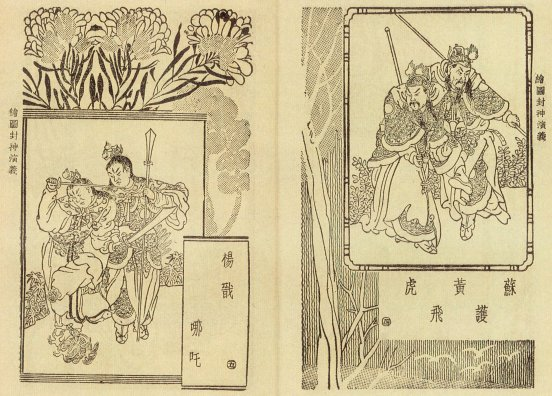
Depictions of Fengshen Yanyi characters. From left: Nezha, Yang Jian, Su Hu, and Huang Feihu.

Su Hu is one of the eight hundred marquises serving King Di Xin. He rules Jizhou. During a visit to the Shang court, he refuses to give gifts to the ministers Fei Zhong and You Hun, who become his enemies.

Fei Zhong tells Di Xin about Su Hu's beautiful daughter, Su Daji. The king orders Su Hu to send her to the royal court, but Su Hu refuses. He returns to Jizhou and prepares for war. Di Xin sends an army led by Chong Houhu and Ji Chang against him. Ji Chang wants to settle the dispute peacefully, but Chong Houhu attacks Jizhou.

After his son Su Quanzhong is captured, Su Hu plans to kill himself along with his wife and daughter rather than surrender. Ji Chang persuades him to give Daji to Di Xin to save the people of Jizhou. On her way to the Shang court, Daji is killed and replaced by a fox spirit. Su Hu does not know what has happened to his daughter.

Su Hu later turns against the Shang and joins the forces of King Wu of Zhou. He takes part in the campaign against Di Xin. During the battle at Tongguan Pass, he is killed by Yu Zhao, who uses a magical banner to disappear before striking him with a spear. After his death, Jiang Ziya appoints him as one of the four Dongdou Xingguan (East Dipper Star Officials; 東斗星官). (Note: The other three are Jin Kui, Ji Shuming, and Zhao Bing.)

== Tomb ==
In Wen County, Henan, a burial mound called Lianzhu Tomb (連珠塚) is traditionally believed to be the grave of Su Hu and his son Su Quanzhong. According to old county records and local folklore, the two joined the Zhou forces after Daji was given to Di Xin. They were later killed in the war against the Shang dynasty and buried there. The tomb stands on Huanghe Road in Wen County. It originally had two mounds connected by a bridge. A temple dedicated to Sun Zhen once stood on the site but was destroyed during the Japanese invasion of China.

About 100 meters west of Lianzhu Tomb is Yuntuan Tomb (雲團塚), which is traditionally believed to be the grave of Zheng Lun, a general serving Su Hu. Suwang Village, north of Wen County, is also said to have been Su Hu's home.

== Worship ==
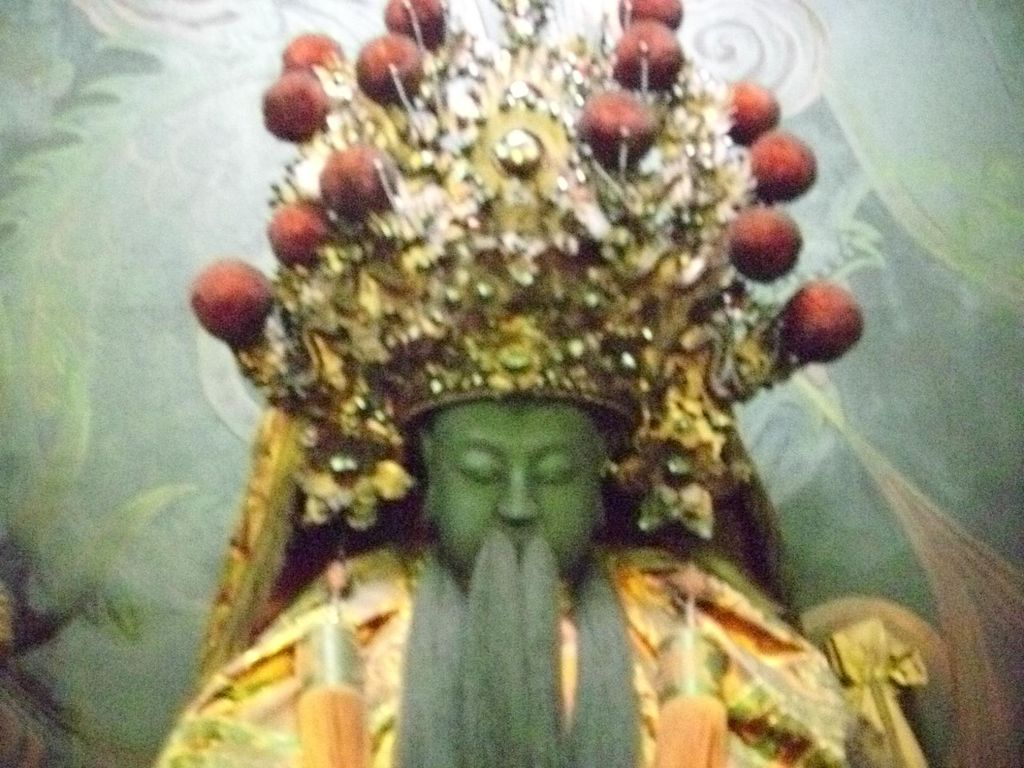
Statue of Sufu Er Wangye at Gangfu Temple

Su Hu is worshipped as Sufu Er Wangye (蘇府二王爺) at Yu'an Temple (裕安宮) in Lukang, Taiwan. According to the temple's stone inscription, he was the marquis of Jizhou during the Shang dynasty. After his death, Jiang Ziya made him the Dongdou Xingjun (東斗星君), and the Jade Emperor later gave him the title of Daitian Xunshou (代天巡狩). The temple's worship of Sufu Er Wangye comes from Wude Temple (伍德宮) in Kinmen.

Sufu Er Wangye is also worshipped at Jing'an Temple (景安宮) in Guanmiao District and Gangfu Temple in Xitun District, Taiwan. These temples belong to the wider worship of Sufu Wangye, whose identity varies among local traditions.
