= Qi coup d'état of 860 BC =

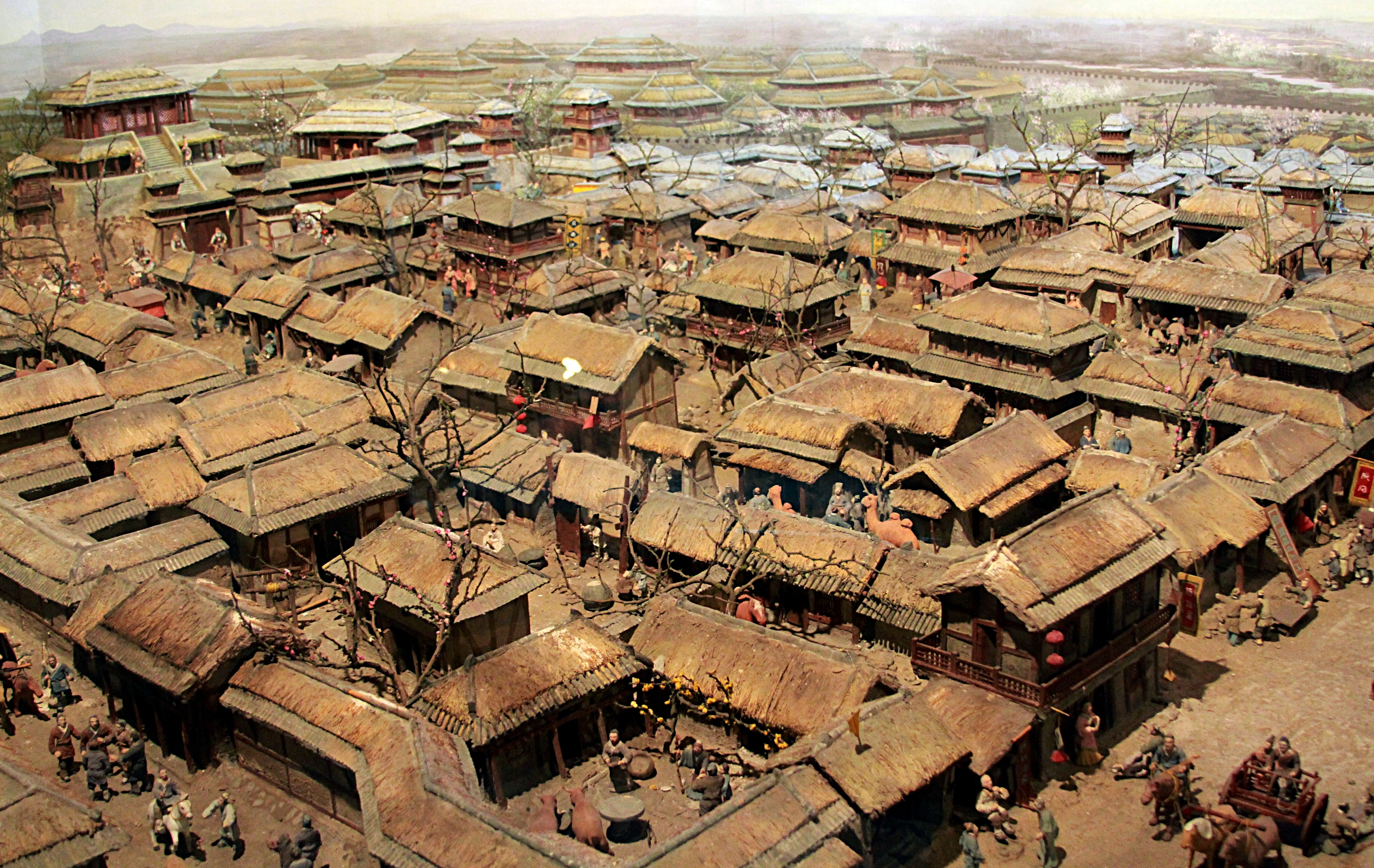
- Modern reconstruction of Yingqiu. The city's citizens were a major force during the rebellion against Duke Hu of Qi.
Date	860 BC
Location	Qi
Result	Rebel victory, Shan becomes duke of Qi

Belligerents
Faction of Shan; People of Yingqiu	Faction of Duke Hu; Zhou dynasty

Commanders and leaders
Shan; Grand Master Tsou Ma-hsü	Duke Hu of Qi †; Shi Shi (Zhou commander)

In course of the Qi coup d'état of 860 BC, Duke Hu was overthrown and killed by a rebel faction, led by his half-brother, Duke Xian. As Duke Hu had been appointed and supported by the Zhou dynasty, the coup led to a royal punitive expedition that failed in removing Duke Xian from the throne. Duke Xian went on to rule Qi for seven or eight years.

== History ==
In 862 BC, King Yi of Zhou summoned the many regional vassal rulers, among them Duke Ai of Qi, to the royal capital. At the conference, the duke was slandered by the ruler of the neighbouring state Ji, which led King Yi to have Ai executed by boiling him in a huge caldron. The king then appointed Ai's half-brother Jing, subsequently known as Duke Hu, as the new ruler of Qi. Due to his ancestry and the nature of his rise to power, Duke Hu's reign appears to have suffered from legitimacy issues; especially because another, full brother of Ai, Shan, resented and challenged Duke Hu's rule.

Perhaps due to his shaky power base and strained relationship with the rest of the ducal family, Duke Hu moved his seat from the old capital Yingqiu to the city of Pugu. This move, however, alienated the citizens of Yingqiu, who consequently began to support Shan's plot to usurp the throne. Shan made his move in 860 BC, leading his followers and the people of Yingqiu in a surprise attack against Duke Hu, defeating and killing him. According to a later account, Hu was personally drowned by a Grand Master of Qi named Tsou Ma-hsü in the Chü River near Pugu. Shan then ascended the throne, and became known as Duke Xian. This coup, however, provoked a confrontation with the Zhou dynasty that had appointed the late Duke Hu as ruler of their choice.

Based on the inscriptions of the "Fifth Year Shi Shi gui", several sinologists such as Shirakawa Shizuka, Edward L. Shaughnessy, and Li Feng have concluded that King Yi sent a punitive expedition under Shi Shi against Qi to remove the usurper Duke Xian from the throne in 860 BC. Since the latter continued to rule for another seven or eight years, Li Feng believes that the Zhou campaign failed and that the royal army possibly suffered "a humiliating defeat [...] at the hands of the regional [Qi] troops". After securing his rule, Duke Xian then proceeded to banish the late Duke Hu's sons from Qi in 859 BC and moved the ducal capital back to Yingqiu, from then on known as Linzi.

== Aftermath ==
Li Feng considers the coup d'état of 860 BC as symptomatic for the increasing weakness and domestic disorder of the Zhou dynasty after King Mu's rule, as the dynasty not only came into conflict with some of its formerly staunchest allies and most loyal vassals, but also failed to dislodge anti-Zhou rebels. On the other side, the conflict between the lines of Duke Hu and Duke Xian did not end in 859 BC, as one of Hu's sons led a revolt against Duke Li of Qi, grandson of Xian, in 816 BC. In course of the fighting, both the duke as well as the rebel leader died, and Li's son Duke Wen of Qi eventually emerged victorious.

== Bibliography ==
- Li, Feng (2006). Landscape and Power in Early China: The Crisis and Fall of the Western Zhou 1045-771 BC. Cambridge: Cambridge University Press. ISBN 978-0-521-85272-2.
- Sima Qian (2006). William H. Nienhauser, Jr. (ed.). The Grand Scribe's Records: The Hereditary Houses of Pre-Han China, Part 1. Bloomington, Indiana: Indiana University Press. ISBN 0-253-34025-X.
