= Lady Ma =

Lady Ma may refer to:

- Lady Ma of Fufeng (died 190), Chinese noblewoman from the late Eastern Han dynasty
- Lady Ma (Qian Yuanguan's wife) (890–939), wife of Qian Yuanguan, the second king of the Chinese state of Wuyue
- Lady Ma, a fictional wife of Jiang Ziya in the classic Chinese novel Investiture of the Gods

== See also ==
- Empress Ma (disambiguation)
