= Pugu (state) =

Ancient Chinese state

- Chinese: 浦姑
- Hanyu Pinyin: Pǔgū
Transcriptions
Standard Mandarin
- Hanyu Pinyin: Pǔgū
- Wade–Giles: Pʻu-ku
Old Chinese
- Baxter–Sagart (2014): *pʰˤaʔ-kˤa
- Chinese: 蒲姑
- Hanyu Pinyin: Púgū
Transcriptions
Standard Mandarin
- Hanyu Pinyin: Púgū
- Wade–Giles: Pʻu-ku
Old Chinese
- Baxter–Sagart (2014): *[b]ˤa-kˤa
- Chinese: 蒲古
- Hanyu Pinyin: Púgǔ
Transcriptions
Standard Mandarin
- Hanyu Pinyin: Púgǔ
- Wade–Giles: Pʻu-ku
Old Chinese
- Baxter–Sagart (2014): *[b]ˤa *kˤaʔ

Bogu
- Chinese: 薄古
- Hanyu Pinyin: Bógǔ
Transcriptions
Standard Mandarin
- Hanyu Pinyin: Bógǔ
- Wade–Giles: Po-ku
Old Chinese
- Baxter–Sagart (2014): *[b]ˤak-kˤaʔ
- Chinese: 薄姑
- Hanyu Pinyin: Bógū
Transcriptions
Standard Mandarin
- Hanyu Pinyin: Bógū
- Wade–Giles: Po-ku
Old Chinese
- Baxter–Sagart (2014): *[b]ˤak-kˤa

Location in Shandong province

Pugu or Bogu was an ancient civilization or state of ancient China around the mouth of the Yellow River.

== History ==
The Pugu are recorded as existing during the Shang and were counted among the "Eastern Barbarians" or Dongyi of Qingzhou. They occupied the shore of the Bay of Bohai around present-day Binzhou and Boxing, an area which the silt deposition from the present course of the Yellow River has since made miles inland.

In alliance with the former Shang prince and son of Di Xin, Wu Geng, Pugu joined the Dongyi of Yan (奄, near present-day Qufu) and Xu in the Huai valley in opposing Shang's replacement by the Zhou after the Battle of Muye. This insurrection joined with the Rebellion of the Three Guards within Zhou itself, opposing the regency of the Duke of Zhou c. 1042 BC. The Duke undertook a successful campaign across the North China Plain, defeating Wu Geng and forcing the submission of the opposing Yi. Pugu's area was granted to the minister Jiang Ziya as the fief of Qi.

The Bamboo Annals record that during the Duke of Zhou's expedition the "royal troops... attacked Yan and destroyed Pugu". The word used (滅) means "destroy" and even implies "extermination". This was, however, patently hyperbolic since "belligerents" required a combined response from Qi, Lu, and Zhou ten years later and the Pugu is again said to have been "destroyed" in the autumn three years after that. (Note: The dates are given as regnal years of King Cheng: the first "destruction" of Pugu occurred in his third year, the allied expedition in his tenth, and the second destruction in his sixteenth.)

During the reign of King Yi, Duke Hu moved the Qi capital to the former site of Pugu. This prompted the residents of the former capital Yingqiu to revolt under another member of his house, who defeated him in battle and restored the former capital.

== Legacy ==
Its name survived as Putai and Putai County as late as the 20th century, although the former is now the subdistrict of Pucheng in Binzhou and the latter has merged with Boxing County.

== See also ==
- Dongyi & Siyi
- Bamboo Annals
