= Duke Yi of Qi =

Duke Yi of Qi may refer to:

- Duke Yǐ of Qi (齊乙公): 10th-century BC ruler of the state of Qi
- Duke Yì of Qi (齊懿公): 7th-century BC ruler of the state of Qi
