= Duke Xian =

Duke Xian may refer to these rulers from ancient China:

- Duke Xian of Qi (died 851 BC)
- Duke Xian of Qin (725–704 BC)
- Duke Xian of Jin (died 651 BC)
- Duke Xian of Qin (424–362 BC)
