= Duke Hu =

Duke Hu may refer to:

- Duke Hu of Chen (fl. 11th century BC)
- Duke Hu of Qi (fl. 9th century BC)
