= Duke Ding =

Duke Ding may refer to:

- Duke Ding of Qi, 10th century ruler of Qi
- Duke Ding of Jin (died 475 BCE), ruler of Jin
