= Duke Xian of Qi =

Duke Xian of Qi 齊獻公

Duke of Qi
- Reign: 859–851 BC
- Predecessor: Duke Hu
- Successor: Duke Wu
- Died: 851 BC
- Issue: Duke Wu
Names
- Ancestral name: Jiāng (姜); Clan name: Lǚ (呂); Given name: Shān (山)
Posthumous name
- Duke Xian (獻公)
- House: Jiang
- Dynasty: Jiang Qi
- Father: Duke Gui

Duke Xian of Qi (Chinese: 齊獻公; pinyin: Qí Xiàn Gōng), personal name Lü Shan, was the seventh ruler of the Jiang Qi state from 859 BC until his death in 851 BC. Duke Xian was a younger son of Duke Gui.

Sima Qian records that during the reign of his older brother, Duke Hu, the capital of Qi was relocated from Yingqiu (Linzi) to Bogu. The move was resented by the people of Yingqiu, who rebelled under the leadership of Duke Xian, who then took the throne. Duke Xian is said to have killed Duke Hu during the attack. During his reign, Duke Xian expelled the sons of Duke Hu, and moved the capital back to Linzi. He reigned for 9 years and died in 851 BC. He was succeeded by his son, Duke Wu. Archaeological evidence from the Gaoqing Chenzhuang (高青陈庄遗址) site appears to support the claim.

== Family ==
Sons:

- Duke Wu of Qi (d. 825 BC), ruled as Duke of Qi from 849–825 BC

Duke Xian of Qi House of Jiang Died: 851 BC
Regnal titles
Preceded by Duke Hu of Qi	Duke of Qi; 859–851 BC	Succeeded by Duke Wu of Qi
