= Broom Star =

Chinese name for comets and a term for bad luck

The Broom Star (simplified Chinese: 扫帚星; traditional Chinese: 掃帚星; pinyin: Sàozhǒu Xīng), also called Sao Ba Xing (simplified Chinese: 扫把星; traditional Chinese: 掃把星; pinyin: Sàobǎ Xīng), is a traditional Chinese name for a comet. The term is also used to describe a person believed to bring bad luck. In Investiture of the Gods (Fengshen Yanyi), Broom Star is the divine title of Ma Shi (馬氏), the former wife of Jiang Ziya.

== Name and meaning ==
The Chinese word hui xing (彗星) means "broom star". It refers to the appearance of a comet's tail, which looks like a broom sweeping across the sky. In ancient China, comets were sometimes seen as signs of war, disaster or other bad events.

Chinese historical records also used the term xing bo (星孛) to describe a star-like object that became fuzzy or bushy. Such descriptions could refer to comets whose appearance had changed.

In everyday Chinese, saozhou xing is an insulting name for someone thought to bring misfortune. It may be used when a person is blamed for bad events or is believed to bring bad luck to others.

== In Investiture of the Gods ==
In Investiture of the Gods, Ma Shi becomes the wife of Jiang Ziya after his return from Kunlun Mountain. Their marriage is arranged by Jiang's sworn brother, Song Yiren. Ma Shi wants her husband to earn money, but his attempts to sell bamboo strainers and flour fail. The couple often argue about their poor living conditions.

When Jiang Ziya decides to leave Zhaoge for Xiqi, Ma Shi refuses to follow him. She asks him to divorce her, and he finally agrees. After their separation, she marries a farmer named Zhang Sanlao (張三老).

After the Zhou victory over the Shang, Ma Shi learns that Jiang Ziya has become a powerful official. She regrets leaving him and hangs herself. Her soul goes to the Investiture Altar (封神臺).

During the final investiture of the gods, Jiang Ziya gives Ma Shi the title Broom Star (掃帚星). Her name appears in a list with other titles, including the Great Calamity Star (大禍星), Five Poverties Star (五窮星) and Desolation Star (荒蕪星).

== Folk stories ==
In a later folk story, Jiang Ziya tells Ma Shi that she cannot enter any place where there is good fortune. People then begin placing the Chinese character fu (福, meaning "good fortune") on their doors to keep the Broom Star away. This story gives a folk explanation for the custom of placing the character on doors.

== New Year customs ==
In some Chinese New Year traditions, people avoid using a broom on the first day of the lunar year. They believe that sweeping may remove good luck and wealth from the home or bring the Broom Star inside. In places where this custom is followed, people may sweep from outside towards the inside if cleaning is necessary.

The fifth day of the lunar New Year is known as Po Wu (破五). In some places, people sweep their homes and throw away rubbish to drive away poverty and bad luck. The custom is called song qiong (送穷), meaning "sending away poverty". Firecrackers may also be used to drive away misfortune.

== See also ==
- Comet
- Investiture of the Gods
- Chinese astrology
