= Duke Wu of Qi =

Duke Wu of Qi 齊武公

Duke of Qi
- Reign: 850–825 BC
- Predecessor: Duke Xian
- Successor: Duke Li
- Died: 825 BC
- Issue: Duke Li of Qi; Queen Xian of Zhou
Names
- Ancestral name: Jiāng (姜); Clan name: Lǚ (呂); Given name: Shòu (壽)
Posthumous name
- Duke Wu (武公)
- House: Jiang
- Dynasty: Jiang Qi
- Father: Duke Xian

Duke Wu of Qi (Chinese: 齊武公; pinyin: Qí Wǔ Gōng), personal name Lü Shou, was the eighth ruler of the Jiang Qi state from 850 BC until his death in 825 BC.

Duke Wu succeeded his father, Duke Xian, as ruler of Qi. He reigned for 26 years and died in 825 BC. He was succeeded by his son, Duke Li.

== Family ==
Sons:

- Prince Wuji (公子無忌; d. 816 BC), ruled as Duke Li of Qi from 824–816 BC

Daughters:

- Queen Xian of Zhou (週獻後), known as Queen Jiang
  - Married King Xuan of Zhou (d. 782 BC) in 826 BC, and had issue (King You of Zhou)

Duke Wu of Qi House of Jiang Died: 825 BC
Regnal titles
Preceded by Duke Xian of Qi	Duke of Qi; 850–825 BC	Succeeded by Duke Li of Qi
