= Duke Cheng of Qi =

Duke Cheng of Qi 齊成公

Duke of Qi
- Reign: 803–795 BC
- Predecessor: Duke Wen
- Successor: Duke Zhuang I
- Died: 795 BC
- Issue: Duke Zhuang I
Names
- Ancestral name: Jiāng (姜); Clan name: Lǚ (呂); Given name: Yuè (說) or Tuō (脫)
Posthumous name
- Duke Cheng (成公)
- House: Jiang
- Dynasty: Jiang Qi
- Father: Duke Wen

Duke Cheng of Qi (Chinese: 齊成公; pinyin: Qí Chéng Gōng), personal name Lü Yue or Lü Tuo, was the 11th ruler of the Jiang Qi state from 803 BC until his death in 795 BC.

Duke Cheng succeeded his father, Duke Wen, as ruler of Qi. He reigned for 9 years and died in 795 BC. He was succeeded by his son, Duke Zhuang I.

== Family ==
Sons:

- Prince Gou (公子購; d. 731 BC), ruled as Duke Zhuang I of Qi from 794–731 BC

Duke Cheng of Qi House of Jiang Died: 795 BC
Regnal titles
Preceded by Duke Wen of Qi	Duke of Qi; 803–795 BC	Succeeded by Duke Zhuang I of Qi
