= Duke Wen of Qi =

Duke Wen of Qi 齊文公

Duke of Qi
- Reign: 815–804 BC
- Predecessor: Duke Li
- Successor: Duke Cheng
- Died: 804 BC
- Issue: Duke Cheng; Qi Jiang
Names
- Ancestral name: Jiāng (姜); Clan name: Lǚ (呂); Given name: Chì (赤)
Posthumous name
- Duke Wen (文公)
- House: Jiang
- Dynasty: Jiang Qi
- Father: Duke Li

Duke Wen of Qi (Chinese: 齊文公; pinyin: Qí Wén Gōng), personal name Lü Chi, was the tenth ruler of the Jiang Qi state from 815 BC until his death in 804 BC.

Duke Wen's father, Duke Li, was a despotic ruler, and in 816 BC the people of Qi rebelled and attempted to install the son of Duke Hu (Duke Li's grand-uncle) to the throne. Duke Li was killed by the rebels, but Duke Hu's son also died in the fighting. Subsequently, Duke Wen ascended the throne, and executed 70 people who were responsible for his father's death.

Duke Wen reigned for 12 years and died in 804 BC. He was succeeded by his son, Duke Cheng.

== Family ==
Sons:

- Prince Tuo (公子脫; d. 795 BC), ruled as Duke Cheng of Qi from 803–795 BC
- Prince Gao (公子高), the grandfather of Gao Xi (高傒), who was the progenitor of the Gao clan of Bohai (渤海高氏) and the ancestor of Gao Huan, a Northern Wei dynasty general.

Daughters:

- Qi Jiang (齊姜)
  - Married Marquis Mu of Jin (d. 785 BC) in 808 BC, and had issue (Marquis Wen of Jin, Huan Shu of Quwo)

Duke Wen of Qi House of Jiang Died: 804 BC
Regnal titles
Preceded by Duke Li of Qi	Duke of Qi; 815–804 BC	Succeeded by Duke Cheng of Qi
