= Duke Li of Qi =

Duke Li of Qi 齊厲公

Duke of Qi
- Reign: 824–816 BC
- Predecessor: Duke Wu
- Successor: Duke Wen
- Died: 816 BC
- Issue: Duke Wen
Names
- Ancestral name: Jiāng (姜); Clan name: Lǚ (呂); Given name: Wújì (無忌)
Posthumous name
- Duke Li (厲公)
- House: Jiang
- Dynasty: Jiang Qi
- Father: Duke Wu

Duke Li of Qi (Chinese: 齊厲公; pinyin: Qí Lì Gōng), personal name Lü Wuji, was the ninth ruler of the Jiang Qi state from 824 BC until his death 816 BC.

Duke Li succeeded his father Duke Wu, to the throne of Qi. He was a despotic ruler, and in 816 BC the people of Qi rebelled against him and attempted to install the son of Duke Hu (Duke Li's grand-uncle) as the new ruler. Duke Li was killed by the rebels, but Duke Hu's son also died in the fighting. Subsequently, Duke Li's son, Duke Wen, ascended the throne, and executed 70 individuals who were responsible for Duke Li's death.

== Family ==
Sons:

- Prince Chi (公子赤; d. 804 BC), ruled as Duke Wen of Qi from 815 to 804 BC

Duke Li of Qi House of Jiang Died: 816 BC
Regnal titles
Preceded by Duke Wu of Qi	Duke of Qi; 824–816 BC	Succeeded by Duke Wen of Qi
