= Chả cá Lã Vọng =

Vietnamese grilled fish dish

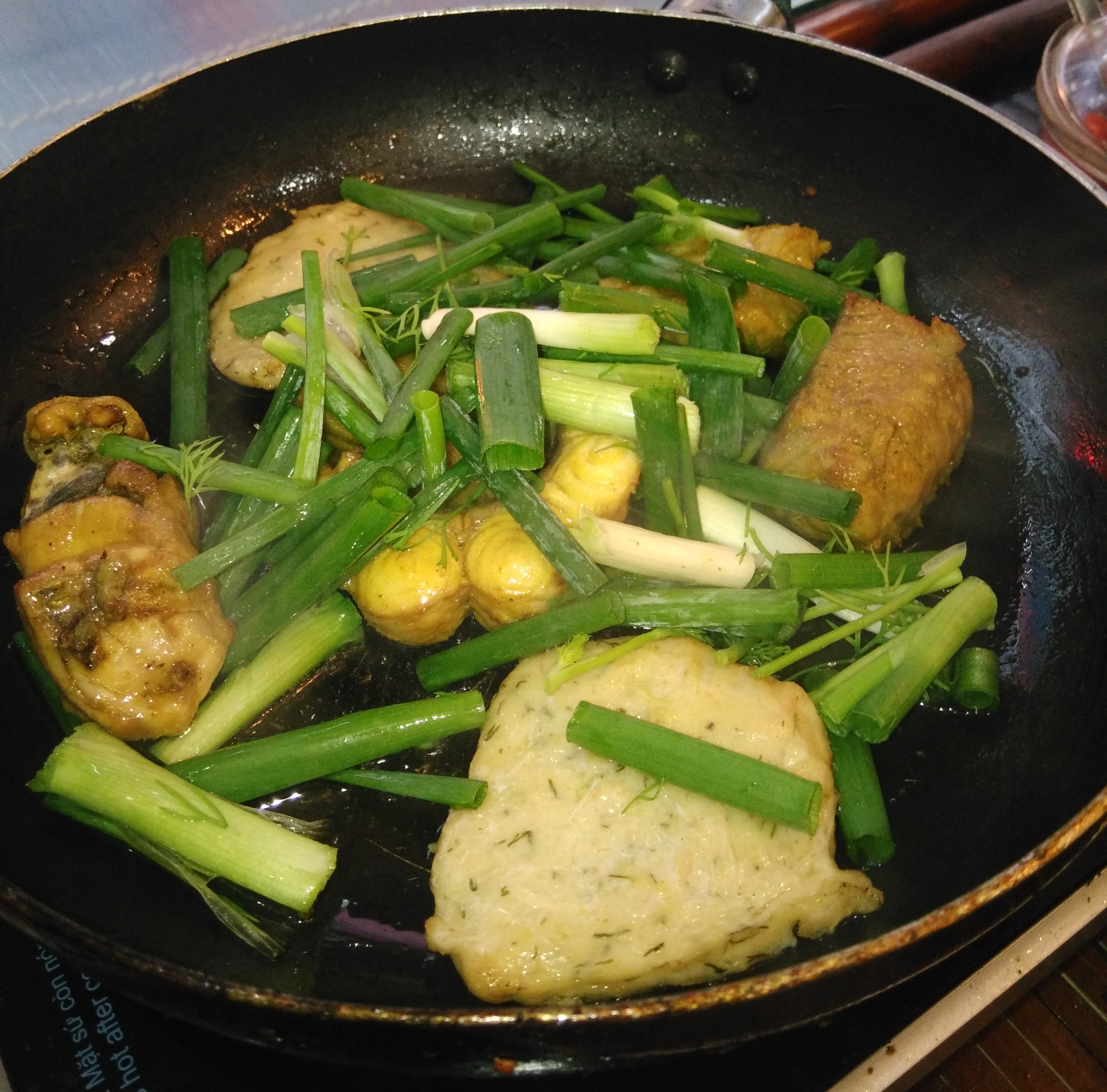
- Course: Main
- Place of origin: Vietnam
- Region or state: Hanoi
- Created by: Doan family
- Invented: c. 1800s
- Main ingredients: Hemibagrus fish
- Ingredients generally used: Turmeric-based sauce (inc. shrimp paste or fish sauce, ginger, and chili peppers) and herbs (e.g., dill, scallions or basil)

Cha ca La Vong (Chả cá Lã Vọng in Vietnamese) is a Vietnamese grilled fish dish originally from Hanoi. The dish is traditionally made with hemibagrus (cá lăng in Vietnamese), which is a genus of catfish. The fish is cut into pieces and marinated with turmeric, galangal, fermented rice and other ingredients. It is then grilled over charcoal and served at the table in a hot pan coated with oil with scallion and dill. It is then eaten with bún noodles, fresh herbs, peanuts and a pungent shrimp-based sauce called mắm tôm. Chả Cá Lá Vọng is considered a Hanoi delicacy, as it is nearly exclusively served in restaurants and is not found in street food.

== History ==
In the 19th century, the Đoàn family living in the Old city of Hanoi were known to prepare grilled fish for their neighbors. The dish became so popular that the local community helped the family open an eatery at Hàng Sơn Street in 1871. The restaurant was colloquially named Chả cá Lã Vọng or Lã Vọng grilled fish. The name refers to a statue (displayed inside the shop) of "Lã Vọng" or Trương Tử Nha, an 11th-century BC Zhou dynasty strategist, Trương Tử Nha fishing was a legend that symbolized the patient wait for a talented people.

The small restaurant was managed by Đoàn Xuân Phúc and his wife Bì Thị Vân. In its early days, it was a meeting place and hideout for anti-colonial rebels. However, the restaurant soon became popular with aristocrats and colonial troops of French Indochina. The Đoàn family had managed to conceal rebel activities for two decades until the French caught Đoàn Xuân Phúc and beheaded him. Hàng Sơn Street was later renamed Grilled Fish Lane or Phố Chả Cá after the restaurant.

The original Chả Cá Lã Vọng restaurant is still in business today, where it only serves its signature dish, and guests eat from charcoal burners at communal tables. The restaurant was listed as a destination in the book 1000 Places to Visit Before You Die.

== Cultural value ==
Cha Ca La Vong is not only a dish, but also a cultural symbol, associated with Hanoi's identity: expressing culinary sophistication, family tradition, and history of fighting against foreign invaders.

Symbol of Hanoi: Becoming a specialty associated with the capital, praised by many international culinary magazines such as New York Times, CNN Travel, Lonely Planet.In 2016, Cha ca La Vong was broadcast on CNN as one of the best Vietnamese dishes in the world.

Living heritage: The original La Vong fish cakes restaurant has existed for more than 150 years, still serving only this dish.

== Contemporary interpretations ==
The dish has left a strong impression on food critics and bloggers. As explained by Florence Fabricant, "The combination of ingredients — turmeric, dill, shrimp paste and fish sauce — delivers an intriguing muskiness bolstered with chiles, silky noodles and a thicket of other fresh herbs to season the chunks of moist fish. My memories are still vivid after 10 years."

Some chefs have developed their own interpretation of the dish, particularly in places where hemibragus may be less common. In the United States, some restaurants serve the dish with a variety of fish types and cooking styles, including: grilled catfish satay, grilled basa, grilled tilapia, whole broiled flounder, and halibut salad.
