= Lady Ma (character) =

Character in Investiture of the Gods

Lady Ma (simplified Chinese: 马氏; traditional Chinese: 馬氏; pinyin: Mǎ Shì; lit. 'Madam Ma') is a character in the Chinese Ming dynasty novel Investiture of the Gods (Fengshen Yanyi). She is the wife of Jiang Ziya, whom she leaves during his years of poverty. At the end of the novel, she receives the divine title of Broom Star (simplified Chinese: 扫帚星; traditional Chinese: 掃帚星; pinyin: Sàozhǒu Xīng).

== Role in the novel ==
After leaving Mount Kunlun, Jiang Ziya goes to live with his sworn brother Song Yiren (宋異人), who arranges his marriage to Lady Ma. She is 68 years old when they marry. Lady Ma wants her husband to earn his own living rather than depend on Song Yiren. Jiang tries selling bamboo strainers and flour, but both attempts fail. He later opens a restaurant and tries trading livestock, but these businesses also fail. The couple often quarrel over money.

Jiang Ziya later becomes an official in the Shang court. He loses his position after opposing King Zhou of Shang's plan to build the Deer Terrace. He decides to leave Zhaoge and travel to Xiqi, but Lady Ma refuses to follow him. She says that she was born in Zhaoge and does not want to leave her home. She asks for a divorce, which Jiang reluctantly agrees to after trying to persuade her to stay.

Lady Ma later marries a farmer named Zhang Sanlao (張三老). After the Zhou victory over the Shang, she learns that Jiang Ziya has become a powerful official. She regrets leaving him and hangs herself. Her soul then goes to the Investiture Altar (封神臺).

During the final investiture of the gods, Jiang Ziya gives Lady Ma the title of Broom Star (掃帚星).

== Earlier accounts ==
The story of Jiang Ziya and his wife appears in works written before Investiture of the Gods. The Zhan Guo Ce describes Jiang Ziya as a man driven away from Qi (齊之逐夫), but does not name his wife or tell the story found in the later novel.

In Wu Wang Fa Zhou Pinghua (武王伐紂平話), Jiang Ziya's wife leaves him because she cannot bear their poverty. Jiang does not try to stop her. The story gives few other details about their marriage.

A different version appears in Lieguo Zhizhuan (列國志傳). In this story, Lady Ma complains about Jiang Ziya's poverty and his failure to find success. However, she remains with him. After Jiang is appointed to serve King Wen, his family shares in his new position and wealth.

== Literary interpretation ==
Li Congshu argues that Lady Ma is shown in both a good and a bad light in Investiture of the Gods. She wants to support herself and her husband without depending on others, but the novel also criticizes her for leaving Jiang Ziya. Li notes that Lady Ma stays with Jiang during his failed attempts to earn money and leaves only when he loses his official position and plans to leave her home. Li sees this mixed portrayal as a problem in the novel's treatment of women and marriage.

Liang Guizhi describes Lady Ma as a short-sighted woman whose portrayal shows the novel's traditional negative views of women. He compares her with other female characters, including Gao Lanying, the wife of Zhang Kui.

Chen Hong compares Lady Ma's different endings in Lieguo Zhizhuan and Investiture of the Gods. In the earlier work, she remains with Jiang Ziya and shares his later success. In Investiture of the Gods, she leaves him and dies after learning of his rise to power. Chen also notes that the later novel adds several failed business ventures to Jiang Ziya's story.

== Later folk stories ==
In one folk story, Jiang Ziya tells Lady Ma that she cannot enter a place where there is good fortune (福). People then begin placing the character fu on their doors to keep the Broom Star away and protect their good luck.

Another story links Lady Ma with the Chinese saying fùshuǐ nánshōu (覆水難收), meaning "spilled water cannot be recovered". After Jiang Ziya becomes successful, Lady Ma asks to marry him again. Jiang has water poured onto the ground and tells her that they can reunite if she can collect it. She cannot do so, and Jiang refuses to take her back.

The spilled-water story was recorded during the Song dynasty and later appeared in stories about the Han dynasty official Zhu Maichen and his wife. In these versions, Zhu Maichen rejects his former wife's request to return after he becomes wealthy.
