= Duke Gui of Qi =

Duke Gui of Qi 齊癸公

Duke of Qi
- Reign: c. 10th century BC
- Predecessor: Duke Yi
- Successor: Duke Ai
- Issue: Duke Ai; Duke Hu; Duke Xian
Names
- Ancestral name: Jiāng (姜); Clan name: Lǚ (呂); Given name: Címǔ (慈母)
- House: Jiang
- Dynasty: Jiang Qi
- Father: Duke Yi

Duke Gui of Qi (Chinese: 齊癸公; pinyin: Qí Guǐ Gōng), personal name Lü Cimu, was the fourth ruler of the Jiang Qi state.

Duke Gui succeeded his father, Duke Yi, and was succeeded by one of his sons, Duke Ai.

== Family ==
Concubines:

- The mother of Princes Buchen and Shan

Sons:

- Prince Buchen (公子不辰; d. 890 BC), ruled as Duke Ai of Qi from 901–890 BC
- Prince Jing (公子靜; d. 859 BC), ruled as Duke Hu of Qi from 889–859 BC
- Prince Shan (公子山; d. 850 BC), ruled as Duke Xian of Qi from 858–850 BC

Duke Gui of Qi House of Jiang
Regnal titles
Preceded by Duke Yǐ of Qi	Duke of Qi circa 10th century BC	Succeeded by Duke Ai of Qi
