= Empress Ma =

Empress Ma or Empress Dowager Ma may refer to:

- Empress Ma (Han dynasty) (40–79), empress of Emperor Ming of Han, empress dowager during Emperor Zhang's reign
- Empress Dowager Ma (Former Liang) (died 362), mother of Zhang Chonghua
- Empress Ma (Southern Han) (died 935), empress of Liu Yan (Emperor Gaozu of Southern Han)
- Empress Ma (Northern Han), empress of Liu Jiyuan (Emperor Yingwudi of Northern Han)
- Empress Ma (Hongwu) (1332–1382), empress of the Hongwu Emperor
- Empress Ma (Jianwen) (1378–1402), empress of the Jianwen Emperor
- Empress Dowager Ma (Southern Ming) (1578–1669), mother of Zhu Youlang
