= Duke Ding of Qi =

Duke Ding of Qi 齊丁公

Duke of Qi
- Reign: c. 10th century BC
- Predecessor: Duke Tai
- Successor: Duke Yi
- Issue: Jizi (季子); Duke Yi; Yi Bo (懿伯)
Names
- Ancestral name: Jiāng (姜); Clan name: Lǚ (呂); Given name: Jí (伋)
- House: Jiang
- Dynasty: Jiang Qi
- Father: Duke Tai

Duke Ding of Qi (Chinese: 齊丁公 or 齊玎公; pinyin: Qí Dīng Gōng), personal name Lü Ji, was the second ruler of the Jiang Qi state.

According to classical Chinese texts such as the Records of the Grand Historian and Zuo Zhuan, Duke Ding succeeded his father, Duke Tai, who was said to have been a centenarian. Duke Ding supposedly served King Kang of Zhou along with other major vassal state rulers including Xiong Yi, Count Kang of Wey (衞康伯), Ji Xiefu and Bo Qin. However, most modern historians believe Duke Ding was in fact the fifth-generation descendant of Duke Tai, and he could not have served King Kang of Zhou.

After Duke Ding died, he was succeeded by his son, Duke Yi.

== Family ==
Wives:

- The mother of Crown Prince Dexing and Prince De

Sons:

- Prince Heng (公子衡), the progenitor of the Nie (聶) lineage
  - Served as the Minister of War of Wey
- Fourth son, Crown Prince Dexing (世子德興), the progenitor of the Cui lineage and the father of Count Mu of Cui (崔穆伯)
- Prince De (公子得; d. 933 BC), ruled as Duke Yǐ of Qi from 974–933 BC
- A son who ruled as the Count of Yi (懿)

Duke Ding of Qi House of Jiang
Regnal titles
Preceded by Duke Tai of Qi	Duke of Qi circa 10th century BC	Succeeded by Duke Yǐ of Qi
