= Duke Yǐ of Qi =

Duke Yi of Qi 齊乙公

Ruler of Qi
- Reign: 10th century BC
- Predecessor: Duke Ding
- Successor: Duke Gui
- Issue: Duke Gui
Names
- Ancestral name: Jiāng (姜); Clan name: Lǚ (呂); Given name: Dé (得)
- House: Jiang
- Dynasty: Jiang Qi
- Father: Duke Ding

Duke Yi of Qi (Chinese: 齊乙公; pinyin: Qí Yǐ Gōng), personal name Lü De, was the third ruler of the Jiang Qi state.

Duke Yi succeeded his father, Duke Ding, and was in turn succeeded by his son, Duke Gui.

== Family ==
Wives:

- Lady, of the Ji clan of Zhou (姬姓), personal name Lan (蘭); the youngest daughter of King Wu of Zhou

Sons:

- Prince Cimu (公子慈母; d. 902 BC), ruled as Duke Gui of Qi from 932–902 BC

Duke Yǐ of Qi House of Jiang
Regnal titles
Preceded by Duke Ding of Qi	Duke of Qi; 10th century BC	Succeeded by Duke Gui of Qi
