= Duke Ai of Qi =

Duke Ai of Qi 齊哀公

Duke of Qi
- Reign: 902–890 BC
- Predecessor: Duke Gui
- Successor: Duke Hu
- Died: 890 BC
Names
- Ancestral name: Jiāng (姜); Clan name: Lǚ (呂); Given name: Bùchén (不辰)
Posthumous name
- Duke Ai (哀公)
- House: Jiang
- Dynasty: Jiang Qi
- Father: Duke Gui

Duke Ai of Qi (Chinese: 齊哀公; pinyin: Qí Āi Gōng), personal name Lü Buchen, was the fifth ruler of the Jiang Qi state from 902 BC until his death in 890 BC.

Duke Ai succeeded his father, Duke Gui, as ruler of Qi. Duke Ai had a dispute with the Ji state. King Yi of Zhou sided with the marquis of Ji and executed Duke Ai by boiling him to death. King Yi of Zhou then installed Duke Ai's younger half-brother, Duke Hu, on the Qi throne.

Duke Ai of Qi House of Jiang
Regnal titles
Preceded by Duke Gui of Qi	Duke of Qi; 9th century BC	Succeeded by Duke Hu of Qi
