= Duke Hu of Qi =

Duke Hu of Qi 齊胡公

Duke of Qi
- Reign: 890–860 BC
- Predecessor: Duke Ai
- Successor: Duke Xian
- Died: 860 BC
Names
- Ancestral name: Jiāng (姜); Clan name: Lǚ (呂); Given name: Jìng (靜)
Posthumous name
- Duke Hu (胡公)
- House: Jiang
- Dynasty: Jiang Qi
- Father: Duke Gui

Duke Hu of Qi (Chinese: 齊胡公; pinyin: Qí Hú Gōng), personal name Lü Jing, was the sixth ruler of the Jiang Qi state from 890 BC until his death in 860 BC.

Duke Hu was a younger son of Duke Gui. When Duke Gui died, Duke Hu's older half-brother, Duke Ai, ascended the throne. Duke Ai had a dispute with the Ji state. King Yi of Zhou sided with the marquis of Ji and executed Duke Ai by boiling him to death. King Yi of Zhou then installed Duke Hu on the Qi throne.

Duke Hu moved the capital of Qi from Yingqiu to Bogu. The move was resented by the people of Yingqiu, who rebelled under the leadership of Duke Hu's half-brother, Duke Xian, who then took the throne.

Duke Hu of Qi House of Jiang
Regnal titles
Preceded by Duke Ai of Qi	Duke of Qi; 9th century BC	Succeeded by Duke Xian of Qi
