= Ancient Linzi =

Archaeological site in China

Coordinates: 36.8829°N 118.3554°E

Linzi during the Warring States period

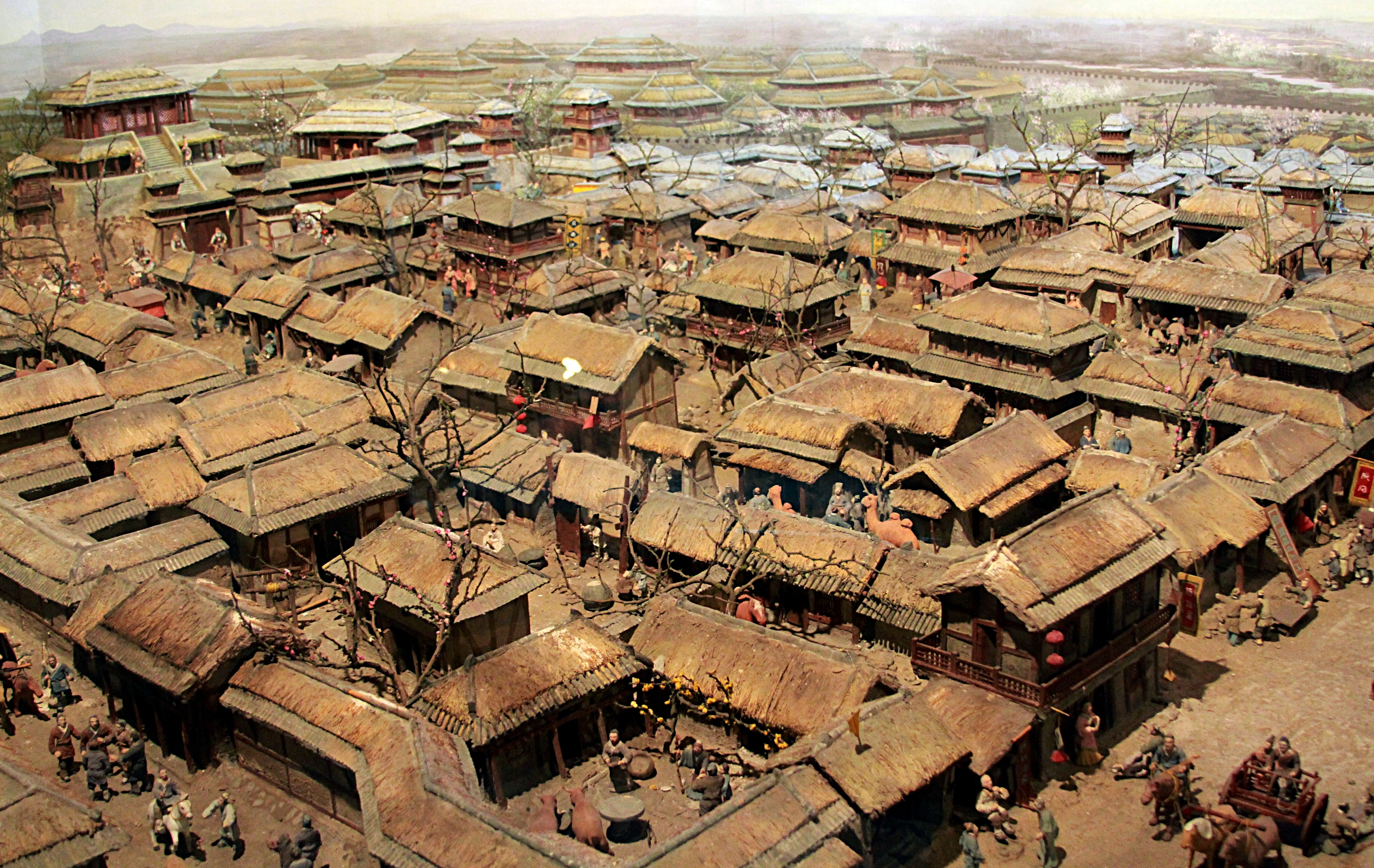
Model of ancient Linzi.

Linzi (Chinese: 臨淄; pinyin: Línzī) was the capital city of the Chinese Qi state. The ruins of the city lie in modern-day Linzi District, Shandong, China. The city was one of the largest and richest in China during the Spring and Autumn period. Upon occupying Linzi in 221 BC, King Ying Zheng of Qin completed his conquest of the Chinese rival states and declared himself the first emperor of China shortly afterwards. The ruins of the ancient city were excavated in 1926 by Japanese archaeologists and in 1964 by Chinese archaeologists.

== Layout ==
Linzi covered an area of around 668 square kilometres (258 sq mi) with the city built between two parallel rivers that ran north–south, the Zi River to its east and the old course of the Xi River to its west.

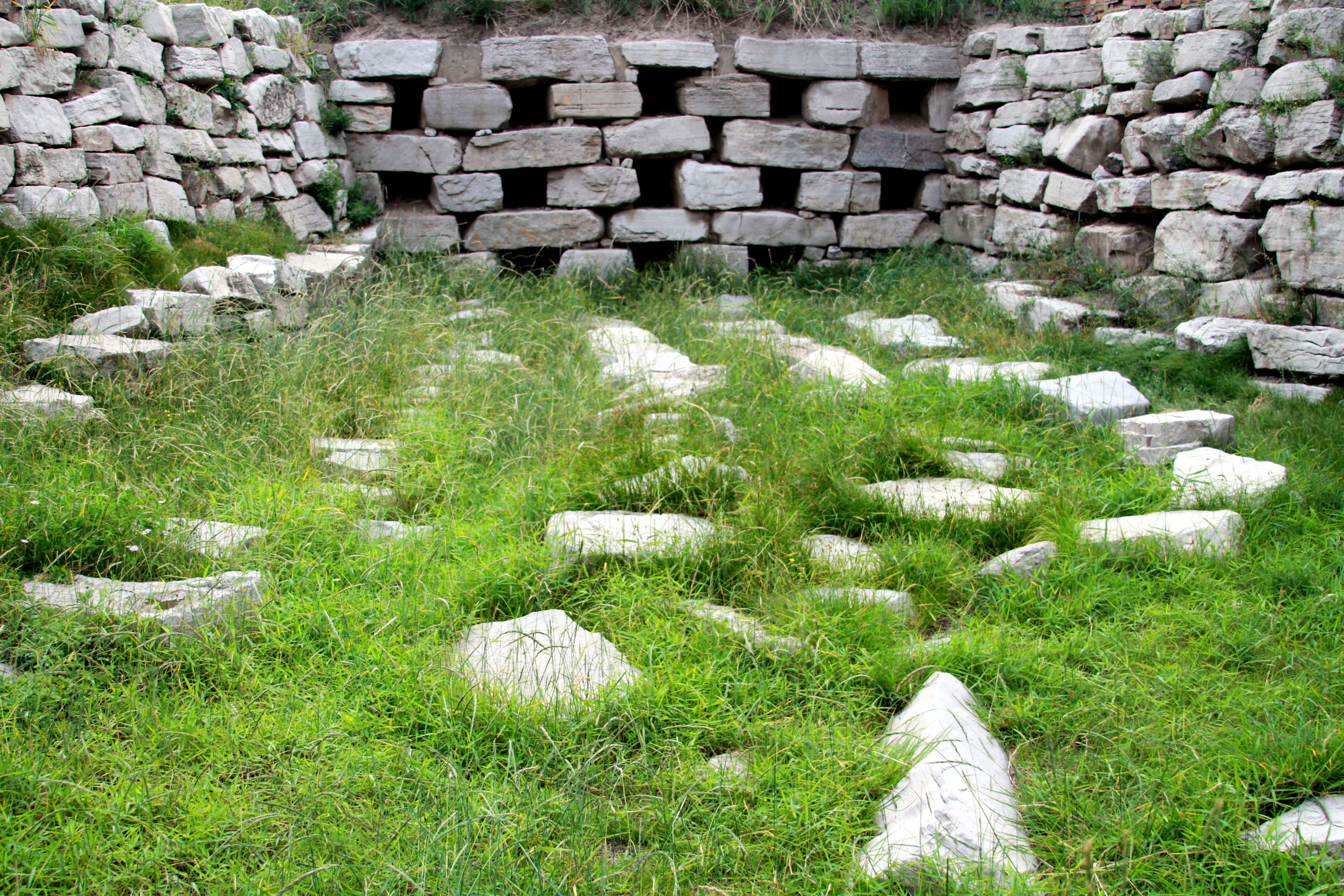
Remains of city sewer passing underneath the former city wall

The city was surrounded by a 14 kilometres (8.7 mi) perimeter wall of rammed earth. The city consisted of an outer city and an inner city. The outer city wall reached a maximum of 43 metres (141 ft) in base width, averaging between 20 and 30 metres (66 and 98 ft) in width. The inner city wall reached a maximum of 60 metres (200 ft) in base width. The city had a sewer and water supply system.

The palace was located in the inner city, located in the southwestern corner of Linzi. A large rammed earth platform was found inside the inner city, commonly referred to as the Duke Huan platform. The remains of the platform measure 86 by 70 metres (282 by 230 ft) and are 14 metres (46 ft) high.

"Seven broad avenues, some 20 metres (66 ft) wide and over 4 kilometres (2.5 mi) long, ran north-south and east-west, roughly forming a grid pattern. Four major avenues met in the northeast section of the city. This area yielded the richest cultural remains from the Western Zhou to the Han."

In the Records of the Grand Historian, the population of Linzi in the fourth and third centuries BC was said to be 70,000 households, with at least 210,000 adult males. Scholars today believe this was somewhat exaggerated.

== Jixia Academy ==
The kings of Qi and the Qi state acted as patrons of the Jixia Academy (ca 315-285 BC) in Linzi, the earliest and largest (in its time) center of learning in China. The academy, possibly named after the city gate (Ji) nearby, was made up of chosen scholars who received a handsome stipend from the government in return for advising the king on government, rites and philosophy. Among the Jixia Academy scholars were Mencius, Xun Zi (who taught Han Fei Zi and Li Si, among others), and Shen Dao.

== Tombs ==
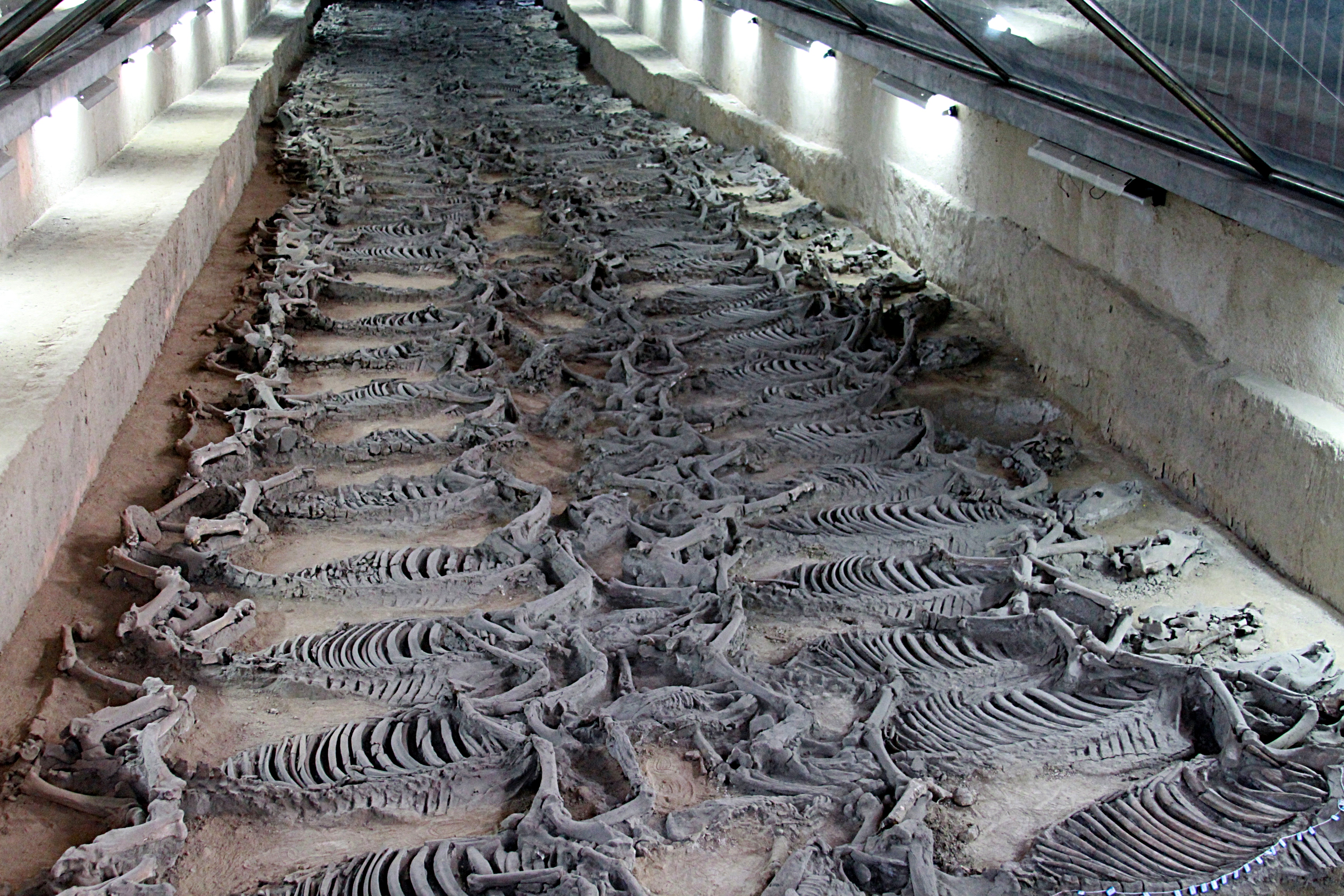
Sacrificial horse pit

The ruins of the city are surrounded by over 100 tumuli, some as far as 10 kilometres (6.2 mi) away. Many of the tombs around Linzi have been looted in antiquity. In pits near what is considered the tomb of Duke Jing of Qi, over 600 sacrificed horses have been found arranged in two rows.

=== Erroneous DNA test ===
An initial test of corpses from Linzi graves' mitochondrial DNA (mtDNA) claimed that their mtDNA was found to be more similar to Europeans than modern Chinese. The mtDNA was reexamined and the initial test was found to be wrong, with results showing European mtDNA sharing no links to the remains found in the graves, and the study says it "highlight that ancient mtDNA data obtained under different sampling schemes and subject to potential contamination can easily create the impression of drastic spatiotemporal changes in the genetic structure of a regional population during the past few thousand years if inappropriate methods of data analysis are employed."

== External sources ==
- Allan, Sarah (ed), The Formation of Chinese Civilization: An Archaeological Perspective, ISBN 0-300-09382-9
