= Ready to Roll =

Ready to Roll may refer to:

== Music ==
=== Albums ===
- Ready to Roll (Thelma Houston album), a 1978 album
- Ready to Roll (Chi Coltrane album), a 1983 album
- Ready to Roll (Helena Zeťová album), a 2005 album by Helena Zeťová
- Ready to Roll (Teenage Bottlerocket album), an upcoming 2015 album by Teenage Bottlerocket

=== Songs ===
- Ready to Roll (Flashlight Brown song), a 2003 song by Flashlight Brown

== Television ==
- Ready to Roll (TV programme), a New Zealand television music programme
- "Ready to Roll" (Ice Road Truckers), a 2007 episode

== See also ==
- Ready to Rock (disambiguation)
- Ready to Run (disambiguation)
