= The Message =

The Message may refer to:

== Film ==
- The Message (1918 film), starring A. V. Bramble
- The Message (1976 film), an Islamic epic drama by Moustapha Akkad
- The Message (2009 film), a Chinese espionage thriller directed by Chen Kuo-fu and Gao Qunshu
- The Message (2025 film), a Spanish fim directed by Iván Fund

== Literature ==
- The Message (Bible), a 2002 contemporary rendering of the Holy Bible
- The Message (novel), a 1996 Animorphs novel by K. A. Applegate
- "The Message" (short story), a 1956 story by Isaac Asimov
- The Message (Coates book), a 2024 book by Ta-Nehisi Coates
- "The Message", a 2009 short story by Andrew J. McKiernan

== Music ==
- The Message (Sirius XM), an American radio station

=== Albums ===
- The Message (Andrea Begley album) or the title song, 2013
- The Message (Chi Coltrane album) or the title song, 1986
- The Message (Grandmaster Flash and the Furious Five album) or the title song (see below), 1982
- The Message (Illinois Jacquet album) or the title song, 1963
- The Message, EP, or the title song, by Breed 77, 1998
- The Message, by 4Him, 1996
- The Message, by Gerry Weil, or the title song, 1971
- The Message, by J. R. Monterose, 1959

=== Songs ===
- "The Message" (Cymande song), 1972
- "The Message" (Grandmaster Flash and the Furious Five song), 1982
- "The Message", by Béla Fleck and the Flecktones from Three Flew Over the Cuckoo's Nest, 1993
- "The Message", by Budd Johnson from Budd Johnson and the Four Brass Giants, 1960
- "The Message", by Dr. Dre from 2001, 1999
- "The Message", by Jay Rock from 90059, 2015
- "The Message", by M.I.A. from Maya, 2010
- "The Message", by Nas from It Was Written, 1996
- "The Message", by Onefour, 2019
- "The Message", by Power Quest from Magic Never Dies, 2005
- "The Message", by Sofia Shinas, 1992

== Television ==
- The Message (Philippine TV program), a religious show
- The Message (TV series), a 2006 British surreal comedy series

=== Episodes ===
- "The Message" (Firefly)
- "The Message" (The Outer Limits)
- "The Message" (Prison Break)
- "The Message", 1998 episode of Animorphs
- "The Message", 2015 episode, see list of Steven Universe episodes
- "The Message", final episode of Naruto Shippuden

== Other ==
- The Message (podcast), a 2015 science fiction podcast
- The Message Trust, a Christian youth charity based in Manchester, UK
- The Message, a political party in Libya
- The Message, a 1999 comedy album by Eddie Griffin
- "The Message", also referred to as Branhamism, a term referring to the teachings of the evangelist William M. Branham

== See also ==
- Get the Message (disambiguation)
- Message (disambiguation)
