= Elijah =

Biblical prophet

Saint Elijah
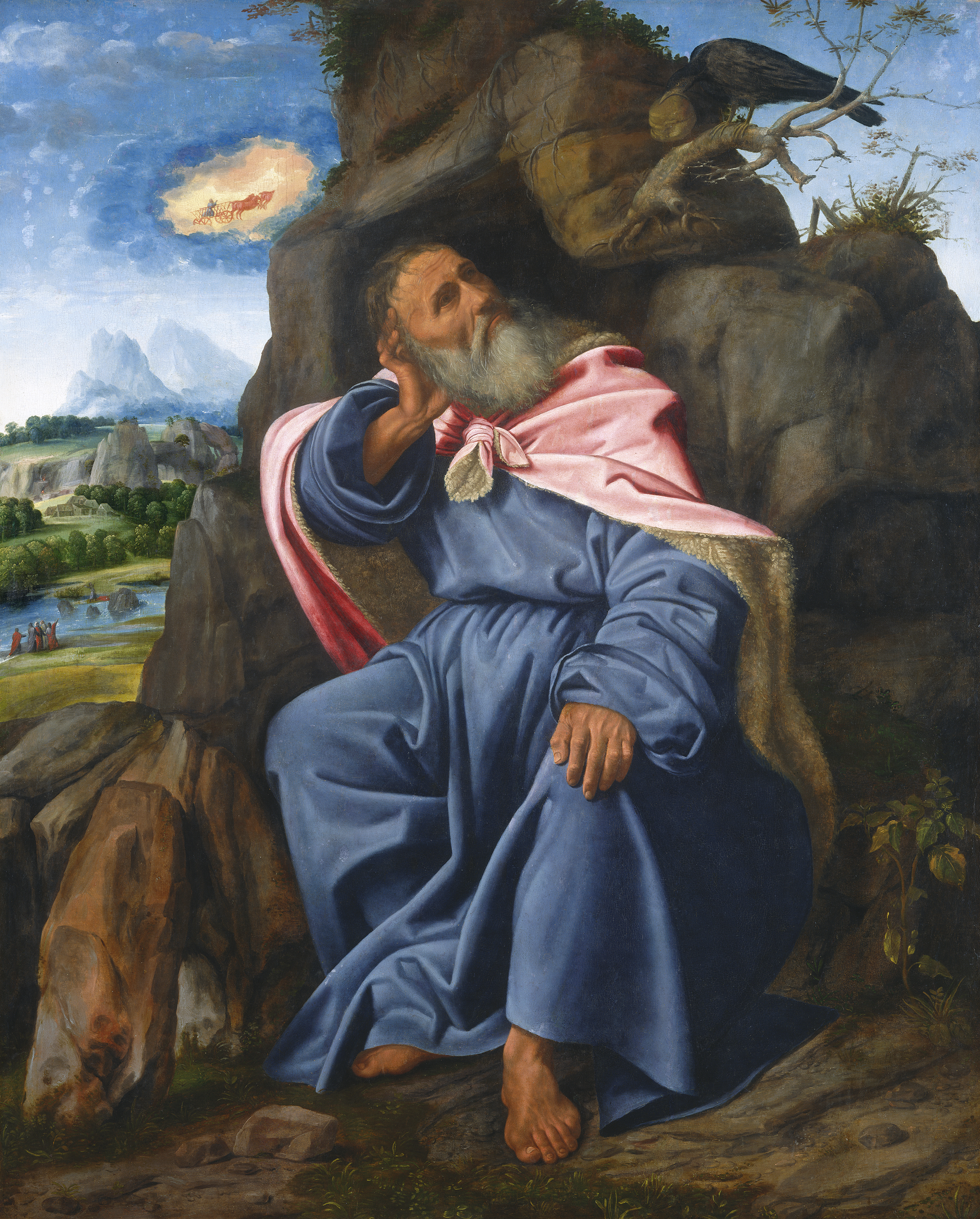
- Elijah Fed by the Raven by Giovanni Girolamo Savoldo, c. 1510

Prophet; Father of Carmelites
- Born: c. 900 BC possibly Tishbe
- Died: c. 850 BC near Jericho
- Venerated in: All Christian denominations that venerate saints; Judaism; Islam; Druze faith
- Feast: 20 July (Catholic Church, Eastern Orthodox Church, and the Lutheran Church–Missouri Synod)
- Patronage: Carmelite Order; 11th Guards Air Assault Brigade; Bosnia and Herzegovina; Druze people; Haifa; Mount Carmel; Melkite Greek Catholic Archeparchy of Akka
- Influenced: Elisha

Elijah (/ɪˈlaɪ(d)ʒə/ ih-LEYE-zhə or ih-LEYE-jə; Hebrew: אֵלִיָּהוּ, romanized: ʾĒlīyyāhu or אֵלִיָּה, ʾĒlīyyā, 'My God is Yahweh/YHWH' (Note: Ancient Greek: Ἡλίας, romanized: Elías; Syriac: ܐܸܠܝܼܵܐ, romanized: Elyāe.)) was a prophet and miracle worker who lived in the northern kingdom of Israel during the reign of King Ahab (9th century BC), according to the Books of Kings in the Hebrew Bible.

In 1 Kings 18, Elijah defended the worship of the Hebrew deity Yahweh over that of the Canaanite deity Baal. God also performed many miracles through Elijah, including resurrection, bringing fire down from the sky, and ascending to heaven alive. He is also portrayed as leading a school of prophets known as "the sons of the prophets". Following Elijah's ascension, his disciple and devoted assistant Elisha took over as leader of this school. The Book of Malachi prophesies Elijah's return "before the coming of the great and terrible day of the LORD", making him a harbinger of the Messiah and of the eschaton in various faiths that revere the Hebrew Bible. References to Elijah appear in Sirach, the New Testament, the Mishnah and Talmud, the Quran, the Book of Mormon, and Baháʼí writings. Scholars generally agree that a historical figure named Elijah existed in ancient Israel, though the biblical accounts of his life are considered more legendary and theologically reflective than historically accurate.

In Judaism, Elijah's name is invoked at the weekly Havdalah rite that marks the end of Shabbat, and Elijah is invoked in other Jewish customs, among them the Passover Seder and the brit milah (ritual circumcision). He appears in numerous stories and references in the Haggadah and rabbinic literature, including the Babylonian Talmud. According to some Jewish interpretations, Elijah will return during the End of Times.

The Christian New Testament notes that some people thought that Jesus was Elijah. but it also makes clear that John the Baptist is "the Elijah" who was promised to come in Malachi 3:1; 4:5. According to accounts in all three of the Synoptic Gospels, Elijah appeared with Moses during the Transfiguration of Jesus.

Elijah in Islam appears in the Quran as a prophet and messenger of God, where his biblical narrative of preaching against the worshipers of Baal is recounted in a concise form. Due to his importance to Muslims, Catholics, and Orthodox Christians, Elijah has been venerated as the patron saint of Bosnia and Herzegovina.

== Biblical accounts ==
Map of the kingdoms of Israel and Judah as they were in the 9th century BC according to scripture. Blue is the Kingdom of Israel. Golden yellow is the Kingdom of Judah.

According to the Bible, by the 9th century BC, the Kingdom of Israel, once united under Solomon, had been divided into the northern Kingdom of Israel and the southern Kingdom of Judah (which retained the historical capital of Jerusalem along with its Temple). Omri, King of Israel, continued policies dating from the reign of Jeroboam, contrary to religious law, that were intended to reorient religious focus away from Jerusalem: encouraging the building of local temple altars for sacrifices, appointing priests from outside the family of the Levites, and allowing or encouraging temples dedicated to Baal, an important deity in ancient Canaanite religion. Omri achieved domestic security with a marriage alliance between his son Ahab and princess Jezebel, a worshipper of Baal and the daughter of the king of Sidon in Phoenicia. (Note: Psalm 45, sometimes viewed as a wedding song for Ahab and Jezebel, may allude to this union and its problems: "Hear, Oh daughter, consider, and incline your ear; forget your people and your father's house; and the king will desire your beauty. Since he is your lord, bow to him; the people of Tyre will sue your favor with gifts." See: Smith (1982)) These solutions brought security and economic prosperity to Israel for a time, but did not bring peace with the Israelite prophets, who advocated a strict deuteronomic interpretation of the religious law.

Under Ahab's kingship tensions exacerbated. Ahab built a temple for Baal, and his wife Jezebel brought a large entourage of priests and prophets of Baal and Asherah into the country. In this context Elijah is introduced in 1 Kings 17:1 as Elijah "the Tishbite". He warns Ahab that there will be years of catastrophic drought so severe that not even dew will form, because Ahab and his queen stand at the end of a line of kings of Israel who are said to have "done evil in the sight of the Lord."

=== Books of Kings ===
No background for the person of Elijah is given except for his brief characterization as a Tishbite. His name in Hebrew means "My God is Jah", and may be a title applied to him because of his challenge to worship of Baal.

As told in the Hebrew Bible, Elijah's challenge is bold and direct. Baal was the Canaanite god responsible for rain, thunder, lightning, and dew. Elijah thus, when he initially announces the drought, not only challenges Baal on behalf of God himself, but he also challenges Jezebel, her priests, Ahab and the people of Israel.

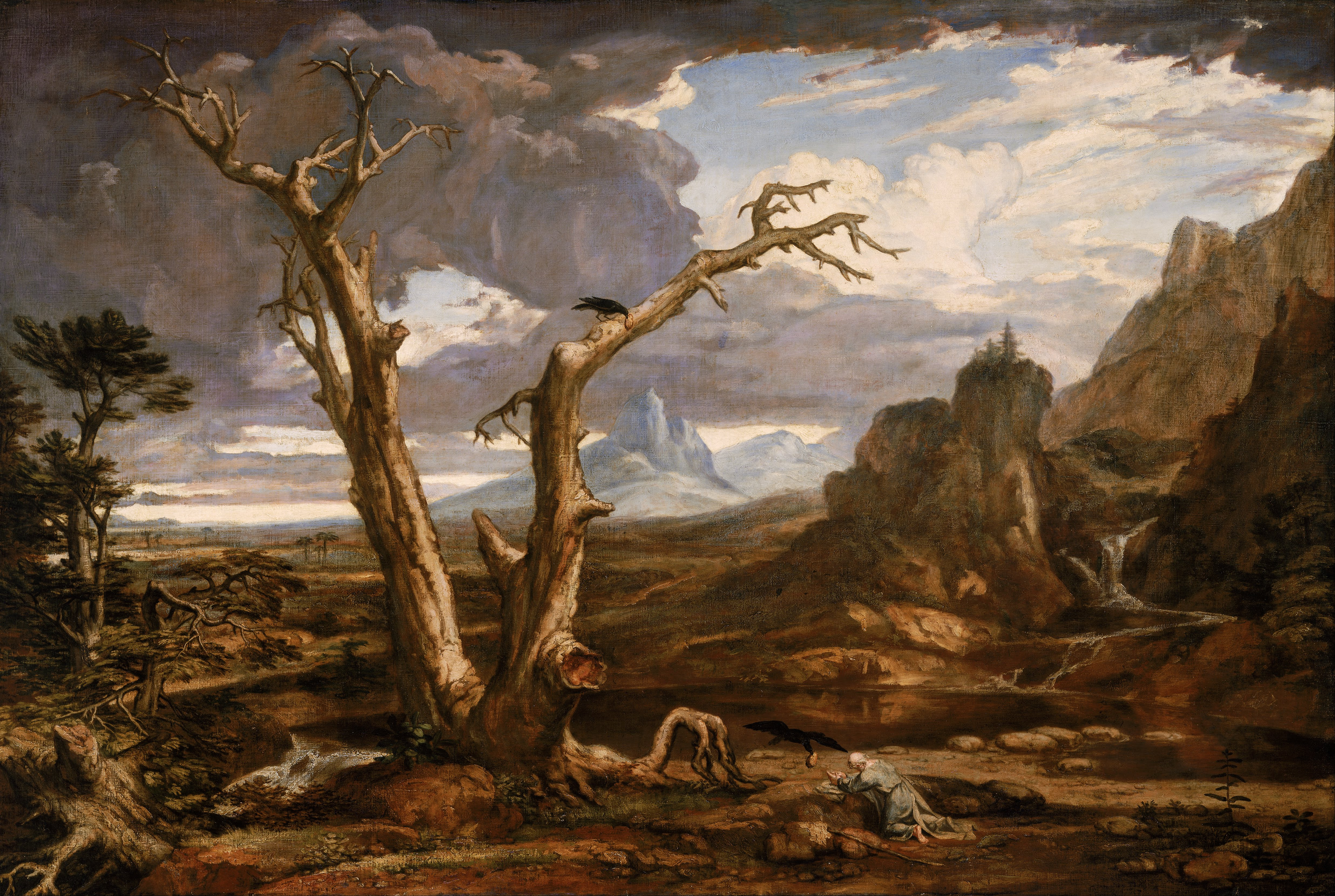
Elijah in the wilderness, by Washington Allston

==== Widow of Zarephath ====
After Elijah's confrontation with Ahab, God tells him to flee out of Israel, to a hiding place by the brook Chorath, east of the Jordan, where he will be fed by ravens. When the brook dries up, God sends him to a widow living in the town of Zarephath in Phoenicia.

When Elijah finds her, he asks her for some water and a piece of bread, but she says that she does not have sufficient food to keep her and her own son alive. Elijah tells her that God will not allow her supply of flour or oil to run out, saying, "Do not be afraid ... For thus says the Lord the God of Israel: The jar of flour will not be used up, and the jug of oil will not run dry until the day the Lord sends rain on the land." She feeds him the last of their food, and Elijah's promise miraculously comes true.

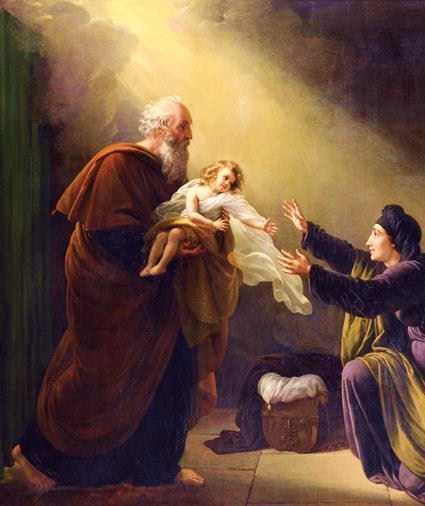
Elijah reviving the Son of the Widow of Zarephath by Louis Hersent

Some time later the widow's son dies and the widow cries, "You have come to me to bring my sin to remembrance, and to cause the death of my son!" Elijah prays that God might restore her son so that the trustworthiness of God's word might be demonstrated, and "[God] listened to the voice of Elijah; the life of the child came into him again, and he revived." This is the first instance of raising the dead recorded in Scripture. The widow cried, "the word of the Lord in your mouth is truth."

After more than three years of drought and famine, God tells Elijah to return to Ahab and announce the end of the drought. While on his way, Elijah meets Obadiah, the head of Ahab's household, who had hidden a hundred Jewish prophets from Jezebel's violent purge. Obadiah fears that when he reports to Ahab about Elijah's whereabouts, Elijah would disappear, provoking Ahab to execute him. Elijah reassures Obadiah and sends him to Ahab.

==== Challenge to Baal ====
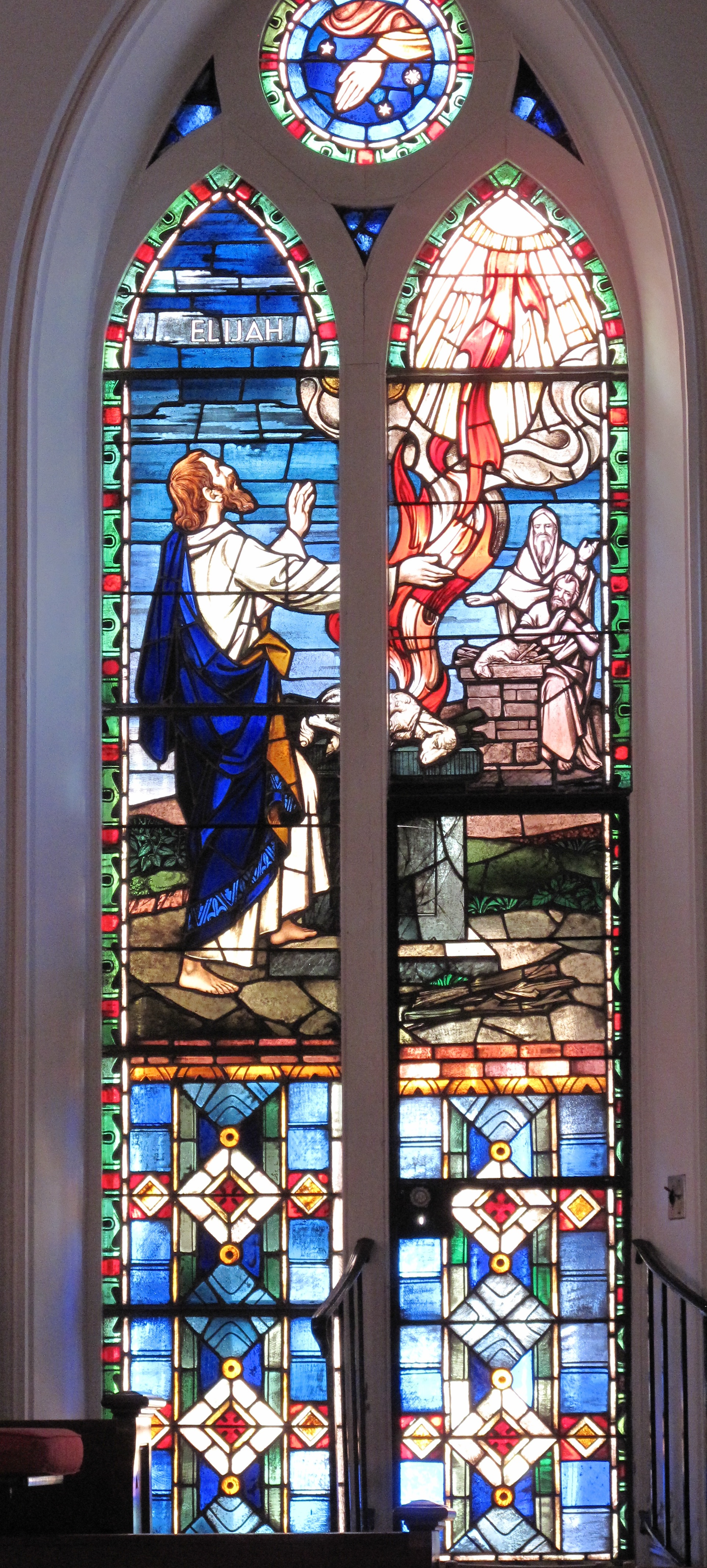
Elijah's offering is consumed by fire from heaven in a stained glass window at St. Matthew's German Evangelical Lutheran Church in Charleston, South Carolina.

When Ahab confronts Elijah, he denounces him as being the "troubler of Israel" but Elijah retorts that Ahab himself is the one who troubled Israel by allowing the worship of false gods.

At Elijah's instruction, Ahab summons the people of Israel, 450 prophets of Baal, and 400 prophets of Asherah to Mount Carmel. Elijah then berates the people for their acquiescence in Baal worship: "How long will you go limping with two different opinions? If the LORD is God, follow him; but if Baal, then follow him."

Elijah proposes a direct test of the powers of Baal and Yahweh (both Asherah and her prophets disappear from the story entirely): he and Baal's prophets will each take one of two bulls, prepare it for sacrifice and lay it on wood, but put no fire to it. The prophets of Baal choose and prepare a bull accordingly. Elijah then invites them to pray for fire to light the sacrifice. They pray from morning to noon without success. Elijah ridicules their efforts. "At noon Elijah mocked them, saying, 'Cry aloud! Surely he is a god; either he is meditating, or he has wandered away, or he is on a journey, or perhaps he is asleep and must be awakened.'" They respond by shouting louder and slashing themselves with swords, spears, knives, and sickles. They continue praying until evening without success.

Elijah then repairs Yahweh's altar with twelve stones, representing the twelve tribes of Israel. Elijah digs a trench around it and prepares the other bull for sacrifice as before. He then orders that the sacrifice and altar be drenched with water from "four large jars" poured three times, filling also the trench. He asks Yahweh to accept the sacrifice. Fire falls from the sky, consuming the sacrifice, the stones of the altar itself, the earth and the water in the trench as well. When the people see this, they declare, "The LORD—he is God; the LORD—he is God." Elijah then orders them to seize the prophets of Baal, which they do, and Elijah brings them down to the River Kishon and slays them, at which the rains begin, signaling the end of the famine.

==== Mount Horeb ====
Jezebel, enraged that Elijah has killed the prophets of Baal, threatens to kill him. Elijah flees to Beersheba in Judah, continues alone into the wilderness, and finally sits down under a shrub, praying for death and eventually falling asleep. At length an angel of the Lord rouses him gently, telling him to wake up and eat. When he awakens he finds bread and a jar of water, eats, drinks, and goes back to sleep. The angel then comes to him a second time, telling him to eat and drink afresh, because he has a long journey ahead of him.

Elijah travels for forty days and forty nights to Mount Horeb, where Moses had received the Ten Commandments. Elijah is the only person described in the Bible as returning to Horeb, after Moses and his generation had left Horeb several centuries before. He seeks shelter in a cave. Elijah is told to "Go out and stand on the mountain in the presence of the LORD, for the LORD is about to pass by." There comes a mighty wind, then an earthquake and then fire, but Yahweh is not in any of these, choosing to come instead as a still, small voice, which bids Elijah go forth again—this time to Damascus to anoint Hazael as king of Aram, Jehu as king of Israel, and Elisha as the old prophet's successor.

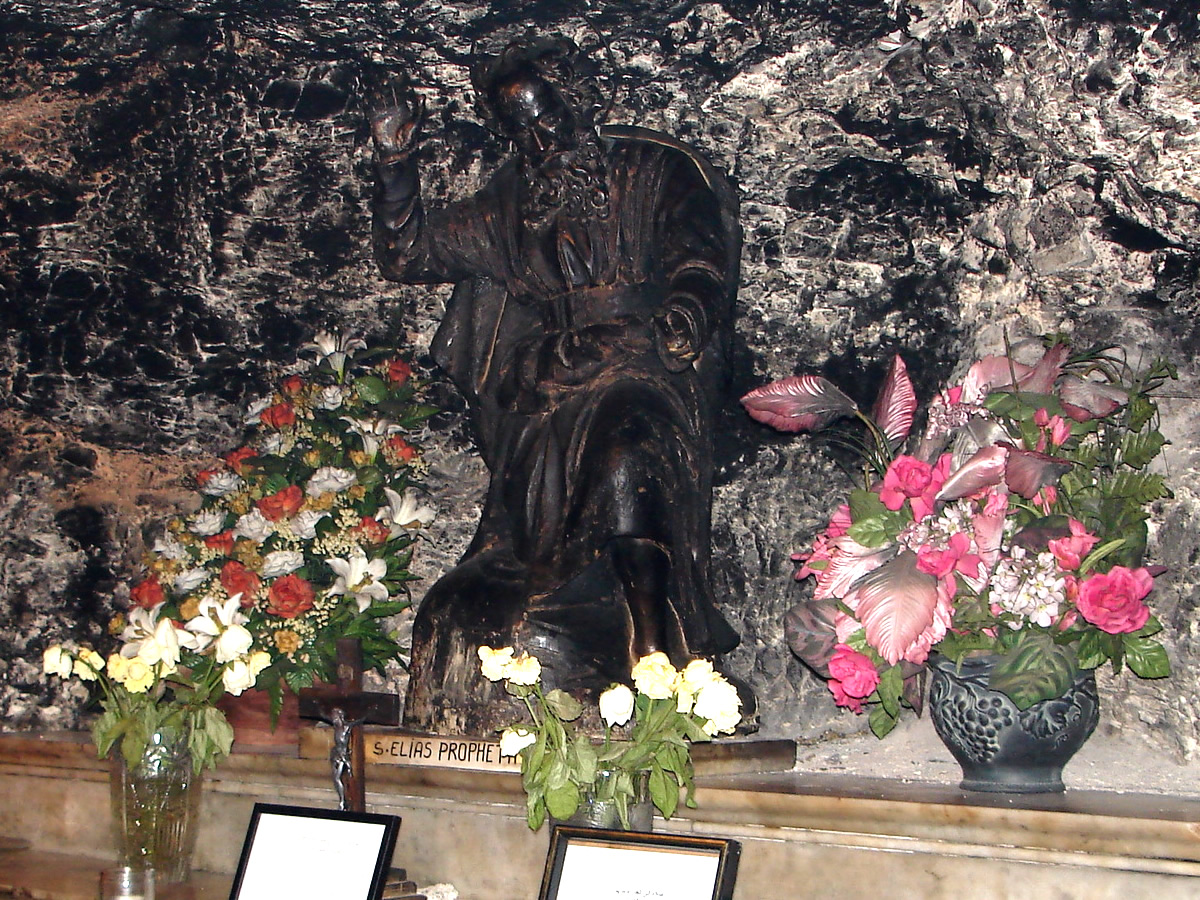
A statue of Elijah in the Cave of Elijah, Mount Carmel, Israel

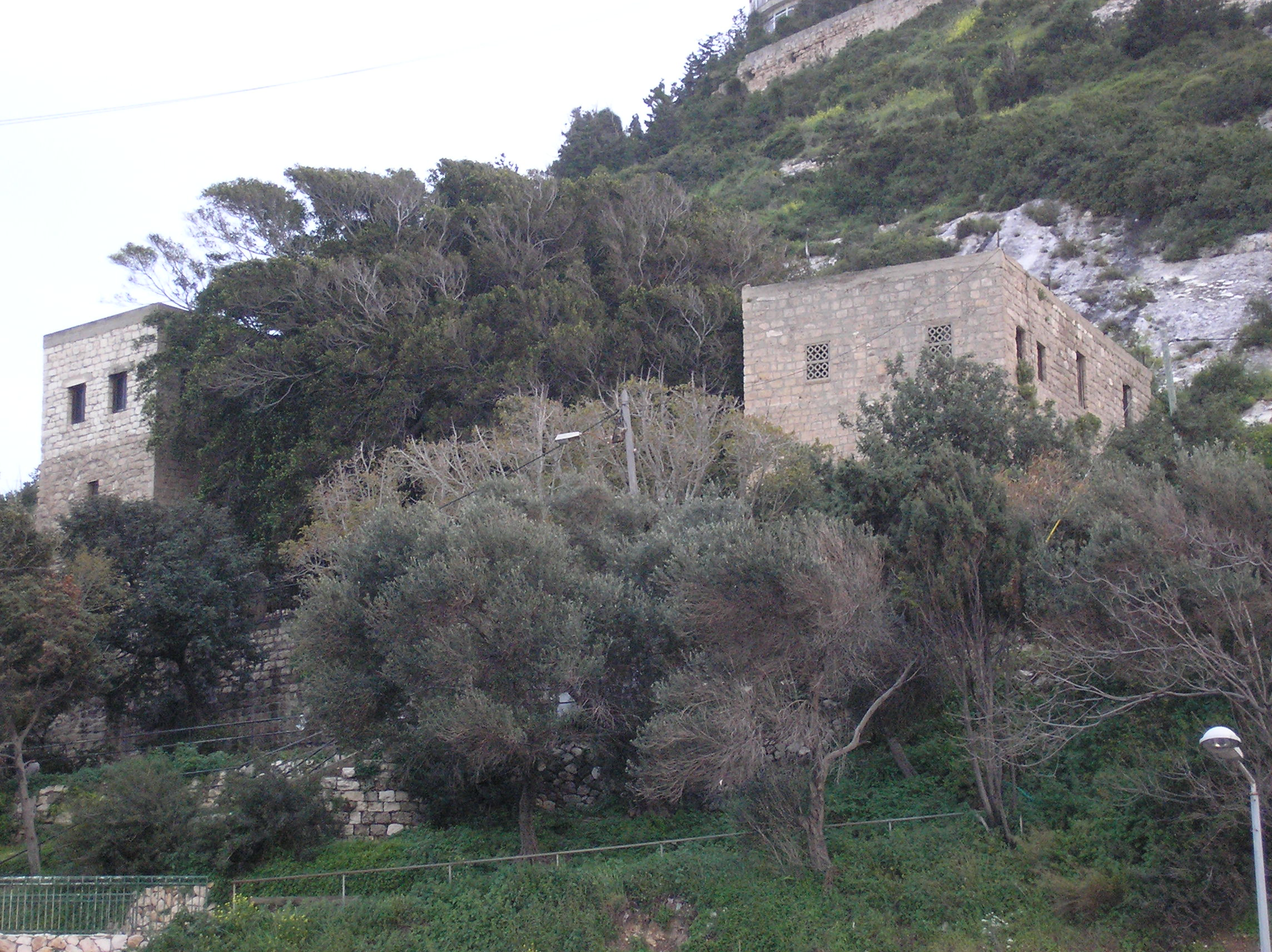
The Cave of Elijah, Mount Carmel, Israel

==== Vineyard of Naboth ====
Elijah encounters Ahab again in 1 Kings 21, after Ahab has acquired possession of a vineyard by murder. Ahab desires to have the vineyard of Naboth of Jezreel. He offers a better vineyard or a fair price for the land. But Naboth tells Ahab that God has told him not to part with the land. Ahab accepts this answer with sullen grace. Jezebel, however, plots a method for acquiring the land. She sends letters in Ahab's name to the elders and nobles who live near Naboth. They are to arrange a feast and invite Naboth. At the feast, false charges of cursing God and Ahab are to be made against him. The plot is carried out and Naboth is stoned to death. When word comes that Naboth is dead, Jezebel tells Ahab to take possession of the vineyard.

God again speaks to Elijah and sends him to confront Ahab with a question and a prophecy: "Have you murdered, and also taken possession?" and, "In the place where dogs licked up the blood of Naboth, dogs will also lick up your blood." Ahab begins the confrontation by calling Elijah his enemy. Elijah responds by throwing the charge back at him, telling him that he has made himself the enemy of God by his own actions. Elijah tells Ahab that his entire kingdom will reject his authority; that Jezebel will be eaten by dogs within Jezreel; and that his family will be consumed by dogs as well (if they die in a city) or by birds (if they die in the country). When Ahab hears this he repents so sincerely that God stays his hand in punishing Ahab, choosing instead to vent his wrath upon Jezebel and her son by Ahab, Ahaziah.

==== Ahaziah ====
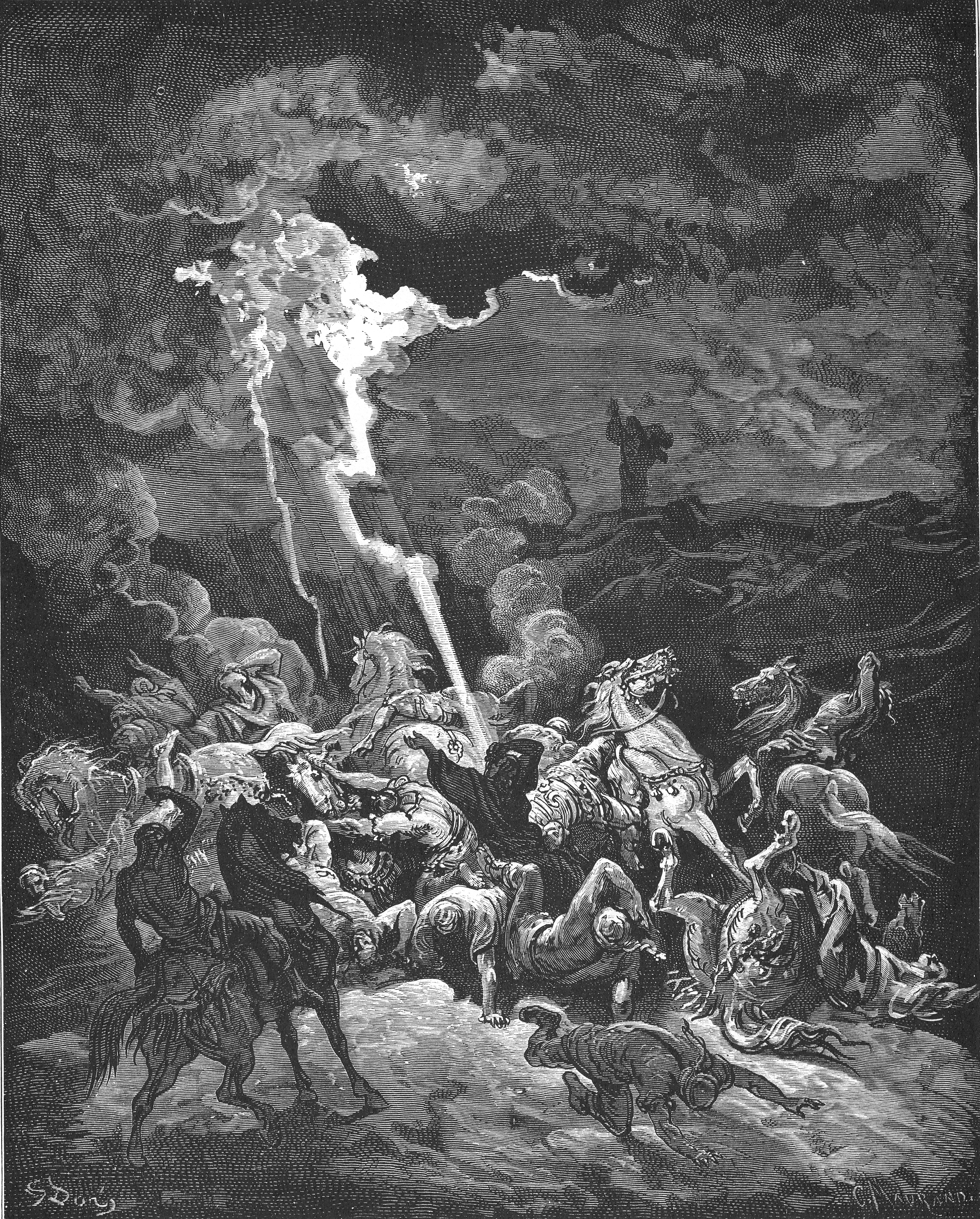
Elijah destroying the messengers of Ahaziah (illustration by Gustave Doré from the 1866 La Sainte Bible)

Elijah's story continues now from Ahab to an encounter with Ahaziah (2 Kings 1). The scene opens with Ahaziah seriously injured in a fall. He sends to the priests of Baalzebub in Ekron, outside the kingdom of Israel, to know if he will recover. Elijah intercepts his messengers and sends them back to Ahaziah with a message "Is it because there is no God in Israel that you are sending to inquire of Baal-zebub, the god of Ekron?" Ahaziah asks the messengers to describe the person who gave them this message. They tell him he was a hairy man with a leather belt around his waist and he instantly recognizes the description as Elijah the Tishbite.

Ahaziah sends out three groups of soldiers to arrest Elijah. The first two are destroyed by fire which Elijah calls down from heaven. The leader of the third group asks for mercy for himself and his men. Elijah agrees to accompany this third group to Ahaziah, where he gives his prophecy in person. Ahaziah dies without recovering from his injuries in accordance with Elijah's word. Therefore Elijah was known as most bold, aggressive, rude and fiery among prophets.

==== Departure ====
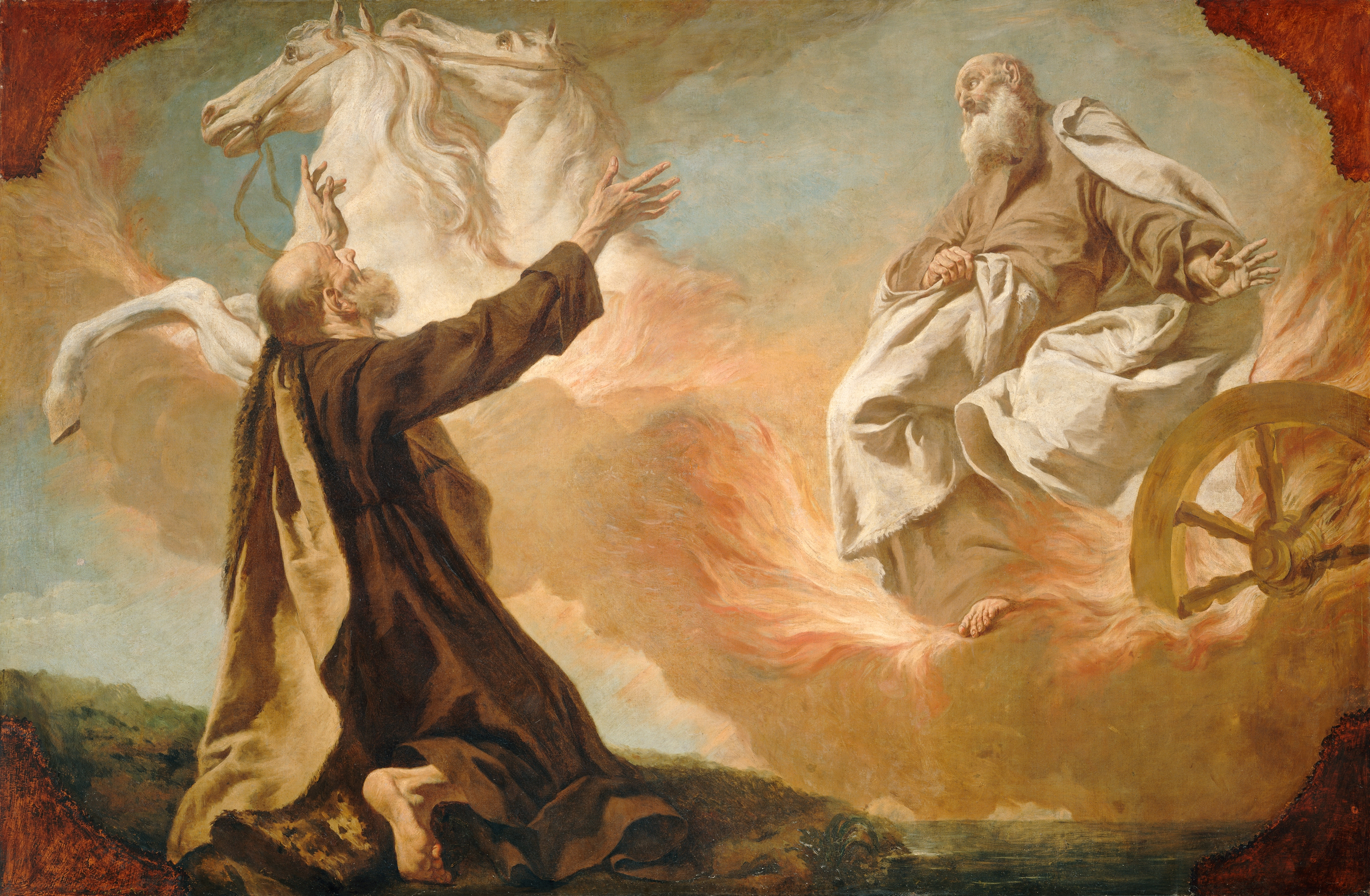
Elijah Taken Up in a Chariot of Fire by Giuseppe Angeli, c. 1740

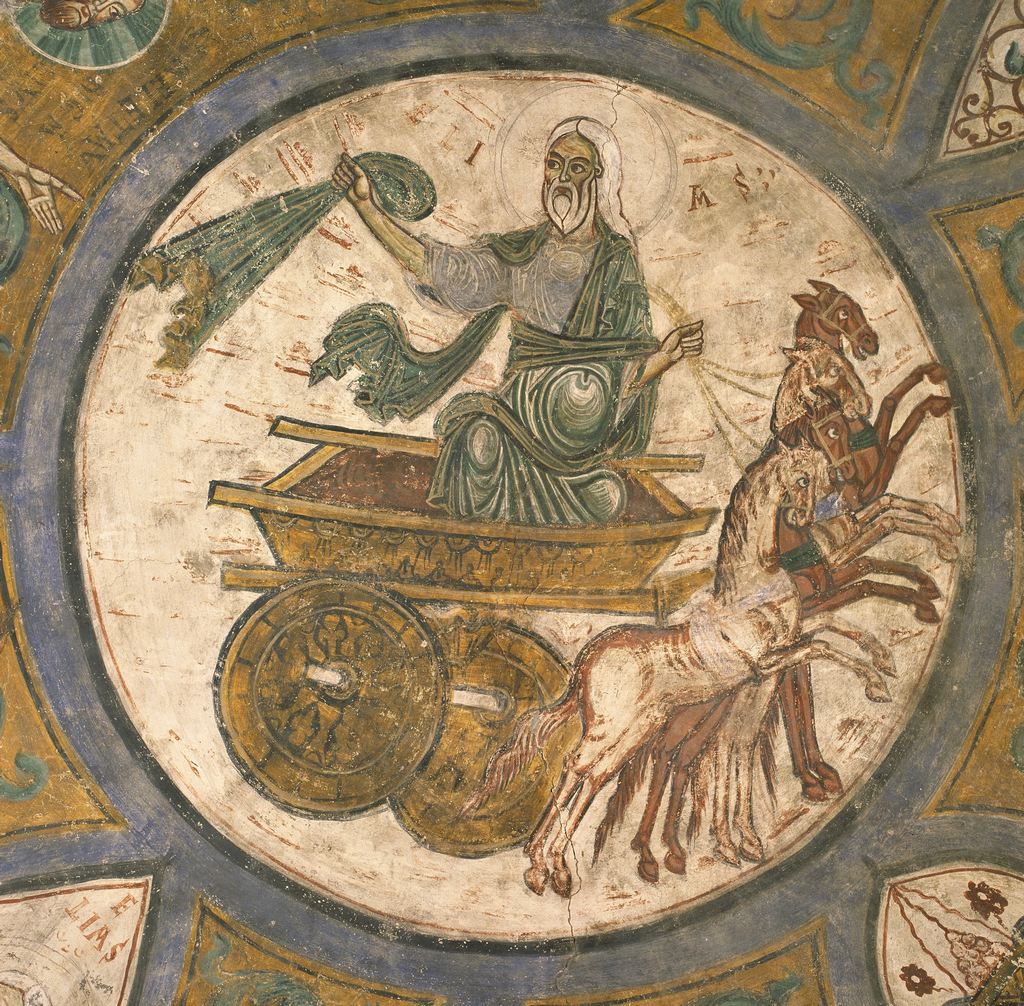
Elijah's chariot in the whirlwind. Fresco, Anagni Cathedral, c. 1250

According to 2 Kings 2:3–9, Elisha (Eliseus) and "the sons of the prophets" knew beforehand that Elijah would one day be assumed into heaven. Elisha asked Elijah to "let a double portion" of Elijah's "spirit" be upon him. Elijah agreed, with the condition that Elisha would see him be "taken".

Elijah, in company with Elisha, approaches the Jordan. He rolls up his mantle and strikes the water. The water immediately divides and Elijah and Elisha cross on dry land. Suddenly, a chariot of fire and horses of fire appear and Elijah is lifted up in a whirlwind. As Elijah is lifted up, his mantle falls to the ground and Elisha picks it up.

=== Books of Chronicles ===
Elijah is mentioned once more in 2 Chronicles 21:12, which will be his final mention in the Hebrew Bible. A letter is sent under the prophet's name to Jehoram of Judah. It tells him that he has led the people of Judah astray in the same way that Israel was led astray. The prophet ends the letter with a prediction of a painful death.

This letter is a puzzle to readers for several reasons. First, it concerns a king of the southern kingdom, while Elijah concerned himself with the kingdom of Israel. Second, the message begins with "Thus says YHVH, God of your father David..." rather than the more usual "...in the name of YHVH the God of Israel." Also, this letter seems to come after Elijah's ascension into the whirlwind.

Michael Wilcock, formerly of Trinity College, Bristol, suggests a number of possible reasons for this letter, among them that it may be an example of a better known prophet's name being substituted for that of a lesser known prophet. John Van Seters, however, rejects the letter as having any connection with the Elijah tradition. However, Wilcock argues that Elijah's letter "does address a very 'northern' situation in the southern kingdom", and thus is authentic.

=== In Malachi ===
While the final mention of Elijah in the Hebrew Bible is in the Book of Chronicles, the Christian Bible's reordering places the Book of Malachi (which prophesies a messiah) as the final book of the Old Testament, before the New Testament gospels. Thus, Elijah's final Old Testament appearance is in the Book of Malachi, where it is written, "Behold, I will send you Elijah the prophet before the great and awesome day of the Lord comes. And he will turn the hearts of fathers to their children and the hearts of children to their fathers, lest I come and strike the land with a decree of utter destruction."

== Historicity ==
Scholars generally agree that a prophet named Elijah existed in the Kingdom of Israel during the reigns of Kings Ahab and Ahaziah, that he was a religious figure of great personal dynamism and conservative zeal and the leader of resistance to the rise of Baal worship in Israel in the ninth century BC.

However, the biblical presentation of the prophet cannot be taken as historical documentation of his activity. The biblical texts present his career through the eyes of popular legend and subsequent theological reflection, which consider him a personality of heroic proportions. In this process his actions and relations to the people and the King became stereotyped, and the presentation of his behavior paradigmatic.

== In the Aggadah, Talmud, and extra-canonical books ==
Jewish legends about Elijah abound in the Aggadah, which is found throughout various collections of rabbinic literature, including the Babylonian Talmud. This varied literature does not merely discuss his life, but has created a new history of him, which, beginning with his death—or "translation"—ends only with the close of the history of the human race. The volume of references to Elijah in Jewish Tradition stands in marked contrast to that in the Canon. As in the case of most figures of Jewish legend, so in the case of Elijah, the biblical account became the basis of later legend. Elijah the precursor of the Messiah, Elijah zealous in the cause of God, Elijah the helper in distress: these are the three leading notes struck by the Aggadah, endeavoring to complete the biblical picture with the Elijah legends. His career is extensive, colorful, and varied. He has appeared the world over in the guise of a beggar and scholar.

From the time of Malachi, who says of Elijah that God will send him before "the great and dreadful day", down to the later stories of the Chasidic rabbis, reverence and love, expectation and hope were always connected in the Jewish consciousness with Elijah.

=== Origin ===
Three different theories regarding Elijah's origin are presented in the Aggadah literature: (1) he belonged to the tribe of Gad, (2) he was a Benjamite from Jerusalem, identical with the Elijah mentioned in 1 Chronicles 8:27, and (3) he was a priest.

Many Church Fathers also have stated that Elijah was a priest. Some rabbis have speculated that he should be identified with Phinehas.

According to later Kabbalistic literature, Elijah was really an angel in human form, so that he had neither parents nor offspring.

The Midrash Rabbah Exodus 4:2 states "Elijah should have revived his parents as he had revived the son of the Zarephathite" indicating he surely had parents.

The Talmud states "Said he [Rabbah] to him (Elijah): Art thou not a priest: why then dost thou stand in a cemetery?"

=== Zeal for God ===
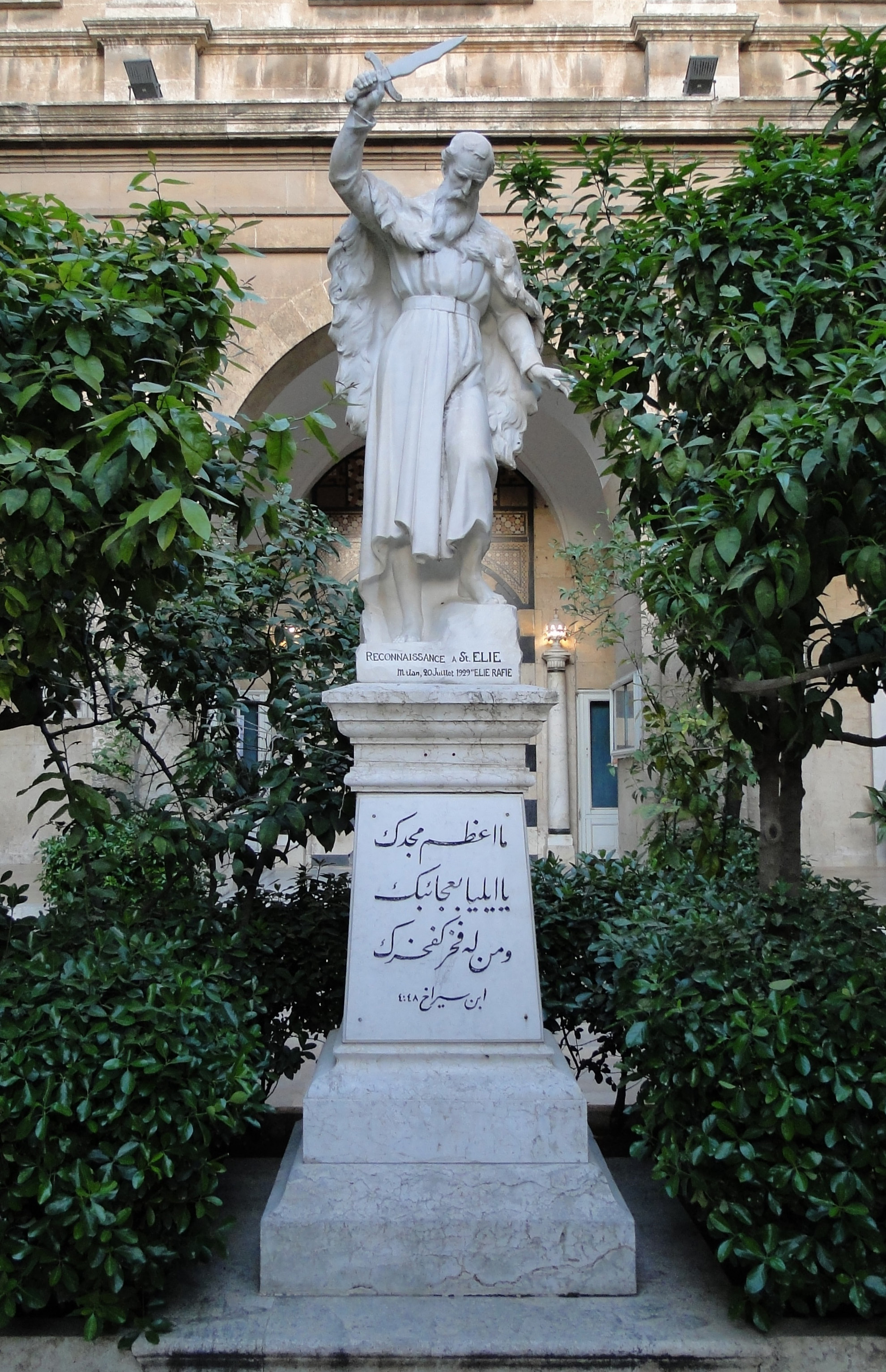
The statue of Elijah at the Saint Elias Cathedral, Aleppo, Syria

A midrash tells that they even abolished the sign of the covenant, and the prophet had to appear as Israel's accuser before God.

In the same cave where God once appeared to Moses and revealed Himself as gracious and merciful, Elijah was summoned to appear before God. By this summons he perceived that he should have appealed to God's mercy, instead of becoming Israel's accuser. The prophet, however, remained relentless in his zeal and severity, so that God commanded him to appoint his successor.

The vision in which God revealed Himself to Elijah gave him at the same time a picture of the destinies of man, who has to pass through "four worlds". This world was shown to the prophet by God through symbolism: in the form of the wind, since the world disappears as the wind; storm is the day of death, before which man trembles; fire is the judgment in Gehenna; and the stillness is the last day.

Three years after this vision, Elijah was "translated". Concerning the place to which Elijah was transferred, opinions differ among Jews and Christians, but the old view was that Elijah was received among the heavenly inhabitants, where he records the deeds of men.

But as early as the middle of the 2nd century, when the notion of translation to heaven underwent divergent possible interpretations by Christian theologians, the assertion was made that Elijah never entered into heaven proper. In later literature paradise is generally designated as the abode of Elijah, but since the location of paradise is itself uncertain, the last two statements may be identical.

=== Sirach ===
At the appointed time, it is written, you are destined to calm the wrath of God before it breaks out in fury, to turn the hearts of parents to their children, and to restore the tribes of Jacob.

— A line in the Book of Sirach describing Elijah's mission (Sirach 48:10).

Elijah's glory is honored in the Book of Sirach (Ecclesiasticus). His designated tasks are altered to:

- calming God's fury,
- restoring familial peace, and
- restoring the Twelve Tribes of Israel.

== In Judaism ==
=== Elijah's chair ===
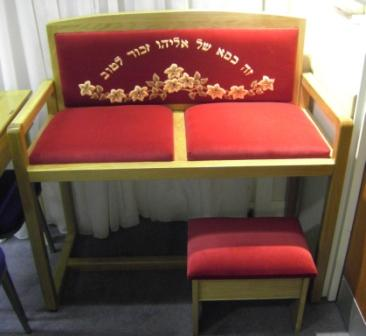
"Chair of Elijah" used during the brit milah (circumcision) ceremony. The Hebrew inscription reads "This is the chair of Elijah, remembered for Good."

At Jewish circumcision ceremonies, a chair is set aside for the use of the prophet Elijah. Elijah is said to be a witness at all circumcisions when the sign of the covenant is placed upon the body of the child. This custom stems from the incident at Mount Horeb: Elijah had arrived at Mount Horeb after the demonstration of God's presence and power on Mount Carmel. God asks Elijah to explain his arrival, and Elijah replies: "I have been very zealous for the Lord, the God of hosts; for the people of Israel have forsaken thy covenant, thrown down thy altars, and slain thy prophets with the sword; and I, even I only, am left; and they seek my life, to take it away". According to Rabbinic tradition, Elijah's words were patently untrue, and since Elijah accused Israel of failing to uphold the covenant, God would require Elijah to be present at every covenant of circumcision.

=== Elijah's cup ===
In the Talmudic literature, Elijah would visit rabbis to help solve particularly difficult legal problems. Malachi had cited Elijah as the harbinger of the eschaton. Thus, when confronted with reconciling impossibly conflicting laws or rituals, the rabbis would set aside any decision "until Elijah comes".

One such decision was whether the Passover Seder required four or five cups of wine. Each serving of wine corresponds to one of the "four expressions of redemption" in the Book of Exodus:

I am the Lord, and I will bring you out from under the burdens of the Egyptians, and I will deliver you from their bondage, and I will redeem you with an out-stretched arm and with great acts of judgment, and I will take you for my people, and I will be your God; and you shall know that I am the Lord your God, who has brought you out from under the burdens of the Egyptians.

The next verse, "And I will bring you into the land which I swore to give to Abraham, to Isaac, and to Jacob; I will give it to you for a possession. I am the Lord." was not fulfilled until the generation following the Passover story, and the rabbis could not decide whether this verse counted as part of the Passover celebration (thus deserving of another serving of wine). Thus, a cup was left for the arrival of Elijah.

In practice the fifth cup has come to be seen as a celebration of future redemption. Today, a place is reserved at the seder table and a cup of wine is placed there for Elijah. During the seder, the door of the house is opened and Elijah is invited in. Traditionally, the cup is viewed as Elijah's and is used for no other purpose.

=== Havdalah ===
Havdalah is the ceremony that concludes the Sabbath Day (Saturday evening in Jewish tradition). As part of the concluding hymn, an appeal is made to God that Elijah will come during the following week. "Elijah the Prophet, Elijah the Tishbite, Elijah from Gilead. Let him come quickly, in our day with the messiah, the son of David."

== In Jewish folklore ==
The volume of references to Elijah in folklore stands in marked contrast to that in the canon. Elijah's miraculous transferral to heaven led to speculation about his true identity. Louis Ginzberg equates him with Phinehas, Aaron's grandson. Because of Phinehas's zealousness for God, he and his descendants were promised "a covenant of lasting priesthood". Therefore, Elijah is a priest as well as a prophet. Elijah is also equated with the archangel Sandalphon, whose four wings will carry him to any part of the earth. When forced to choose between death and dishonor, Rav Kahana II decided to leap to his death. Before he could strike the ground, Elijah (i.e., Sandalphon) appeared to catch him. Elijah is also sometimes called the "Angel of the Covenant".

=== Rabbi Joshua ben Levi ===
References to Elijah in Jewish folklore range from short observations (e.g., it is said that when dogs are happy for no reason, it is because Elijah is nearby) to lengthy parables on the nature of God's justice.

One such story is that of Rabbi Joshua ben Levi. The rabbi, a friend of Elijah's, was asked what favor he might wish. The rabbi answered only that he could join Elijah in his wanderings. Elijah granted his wish only if he refrained from asking questions about the prophet's actions. He agreed, and they began their journey. The first place they came to was the house of an elderly couple who were so poor they had only one old cow. The old couple gave their hospitality as best they could. The following day, as the travelers left, Elijah prayed that the old cow would die, and it did. The second place they came to was the home of a wealthy man. He had no patience for his visitors and chased them away with the admonition that they should get jobs and not beg from honest people. As they left, they passed the man's wall and saw it crumbling. Elijah prayed that the wall be repaired, and it was so. Next, they came to a wealthy synagogue. They were allowed to spend the night with only the smallest of provisions. Elijah prayed that every synagogue member might become a leader when they left.

Finally, they came to a very poor synagogue. Here, they were treated with great courtesy and hospitality. Elijah prayed that God might give them a wise leader when they left. At this, Rabbi Joshua could no longer hold back. He demanded Elijah's explanation of his actions. At the old couple's house, Elijah knew the Angel of Death was coming for the older woman. So he prayed that God might have the angel take the cow instead. A great treasure was hidden in the crumbling wall at the wealthy man's house. Elijah prayed that the wall be restored, thus keeping the treasure away from the miser. The story ends with a moral: A synagogue with many leaders will be ruined by many arguments. A town with a single wise leader will be guided to success and prosperity. "Know then, that if thou seest an evil-doer prosper, it is not always unto his advantage, and if a righteous man suffers need and distress, think not God is unjust."

=== Rabbi Eliezer ===
The Elijah of legend did not lose any of his ability to afflict the comfortable. The case of Rabbi Eliezer, son of Rabbi Simon ben Yohai, is illustrative. Once, when walking on a beach, he came upon a hideously ugly man—the prophet in disguise. The man greeted him courteously, "Peace be with thee, Rabbi." Instead of returning the greeting, the rabbi could not resist an insult, "How ugly you are! Is there anyone as ugly as you in your town?" Elijah responded with, "I don't know. Perhaps you should tell the Master Architect how ugly is this, His construction." The rabbi realized his wrong and asked for pardon. But Elijah would not give it until the entire city had asked for forgiveness from the rabbi, and the rabbi had promised to mend his ways.

=== Lilith ===
Elijah was always seen as deeply pious, and it seemed natural that he would be pitted against an equally evil individual. This was found in the person of Lilith. Lilith, in legend, was Adam's first wife. She rebelled against Adam, the angels, and even God. She came to be seen as a demon and a witch.

Elijah encountered Lilith and instantly recognized and challenged her, "Unclean one, where are you going?" Unable to avoid or lie to the prophet, she admitted she was on her way to the house of a pregnant woman. She intended to kill the woman and eat the child.

Elijah pronounced his malediction, "I curse you in the Name of the Lord. Be silent as a stone!" But Lilith was able to make a bargain with Elijah. She promises to "forsake my evil ways" if Elijah will remove his curse. To seal the bargain, she gives Elijah her names so they can be posted in the houses of pregnant women or newborn children or used as amulets. Lilith promises, "Where I see those names, I shall run away at once. Neither the child nor the mother will ever be injured by me."

== In Christianity ==
=== New Testament ===
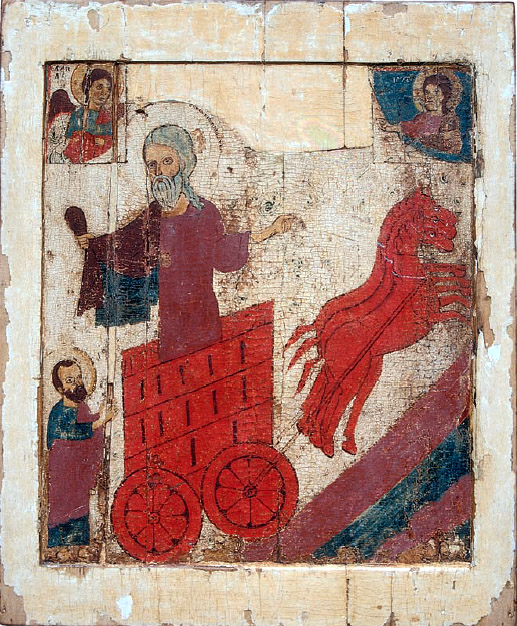
A Northern Russian icon from c. 1290 showing the ascent of Elijah toward heaven

In the New Testament, Jesus would say for those who believed, John the Baptist was Elijah, who would come before the "great and terrible day" as predicted by Malachi.

Some English translations of the New Testament use Elias, a Greek form of the name. In the King James Version, "Elias" appears only in the texts translated from Greek.

==== John the Baptist ====
John the Baptist preached a message of repentance and baptism. He predicted the day of judgment using imagery similar to that of Malachi. He also preached that the Messiah was coming. All of this was done in a style that immediately recalled the image of Elijah to his audience. He wore a coat of camel's hair secured with a leather girdle. He also frequently preached in wilderness areas near the Jordan River.

In the Gospel of John, when John the Baptist was asked by a delegation of priests (present tense) "Art thou Elias", he replied "I am not". Matthew 11:14 and Matthew 17:10–13 however, make it clear that John was the spiritual successor to Elijah. In the Nativity of St. John the Baptist in Luke, Gabriel appears to Zechariah, John's father, and told him that John "will turn many of the sons of Israel to the Lord their God", and that he will go forth "in the spirit and power of Elijah".

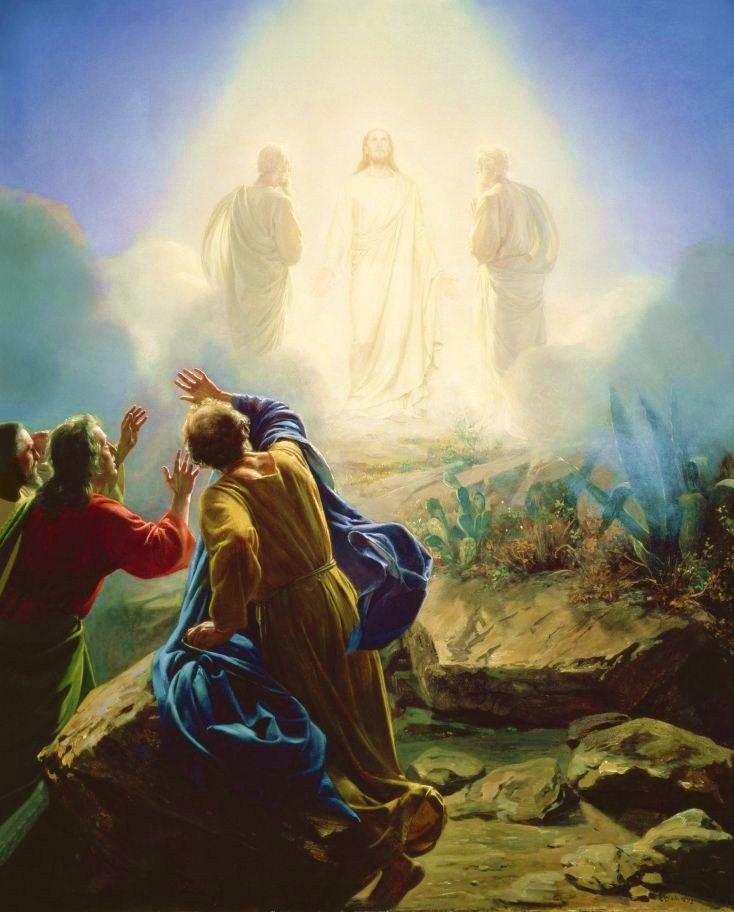
Elijah appears at the Transfiguration of Jesus (as recounted in Matthew 17:1–8, Mark 9:2–8, Luke 9:28–36).

==== Transfiguration ====
Elijah makes an appearance in the New Testament during an incident known as the Transfiguration.

At the summit of an unnamed mount, Jesus' face begins to shine. The disciples who are with Him hear the voice of God announce that Jesus is "My beloved Son". The disciples also see Moses and Elijah appear and talk with Jesus. This apparently relates to how both Elijah and Moses (the latter according to tradition but not the Bible) both were translated to heaven instead of dying. Peter is so struck by the experience that he asks Jesus if they should build three "tabernacles": one for Elijah, one for Jesus and one for Moses.

There is agreement among some Christian theologians that Elijah appears to hand over the responsibility of the prophets to Jesus as the Samaritan woman at the well said to Jesus "I perceive thou art a prophet." Moses also likewise came to hand over the responsibility of the law for the divinely announced Son of God.

==== Other references ====
Elijah is mentioned four more times in the New Testament: in Luke, Romans, Hebrews, and James. In Luke 4:24–27, Jesus uses Elijah as an example of rejected prophets. Jesus says, "No prophet is accepted in his own country", and then mentions Elijah, saying that there were many widows in Israel, but Elijah was sent to one in Phoenicia. In Romans 11:1–6, Paul cites Elijah as an example of God's never forsaking his people (the Israelites). Hebrews 11:35 ("Women received their dead raised to life again...") refers to both Elijah raising the son of the widow of Zarephath and Elisha raising the son of the woman of Shunem, citing both Elijah and Elisha as Old Testament examples of faith. In James 5:16–18, James says, "The effectual fervent prayer of a righteous man availeth much", and then cites Elijah's prayers which started and ended the famine in Israel as examples.

=== Sainthood ===
In Western Christianity, Elijah is commemorated as a saint with a feast day on 20 July by the Latin Church and the Lutheran Church–Missouri Synod. Catholic tradition holds he was unmarried and celibate.

In the Eastern Orthodox Church and Byzantine Catholic Churches, he is commemorated on the same date, 2 August [O.S. 20 July]. He is greatly revered among the Orthodox as a model of the contemplative life. He is also commemorated on the Orthodox liturgical calendar on the Sunday of the Holy Fathers (i.e., the Sunday before the Nativity of the Lord).

Elijah has been venerated as the patron saint of Bosnia and Herzegovina since 26 August 1752, replacing George of Lydda at the request of Bishop Pavao Dragičević. The reasons for the replacement are unclear, but a theory is that Elijah is an important figure for all three of the country's main religious groups—Catholics, Muslims and Orthodox Christians. Pope Benedict XIV is said to have approved Bishop Dragičević's request with the remark that a wild nation deserved a wild patron.

Prophet Elias is also commemorated by the Catholic Church on 17 June. He is also commemorated by the Eastern Orthodox Church on 14 April with all holy Sinai monks.

==== Carmelite tradition ====
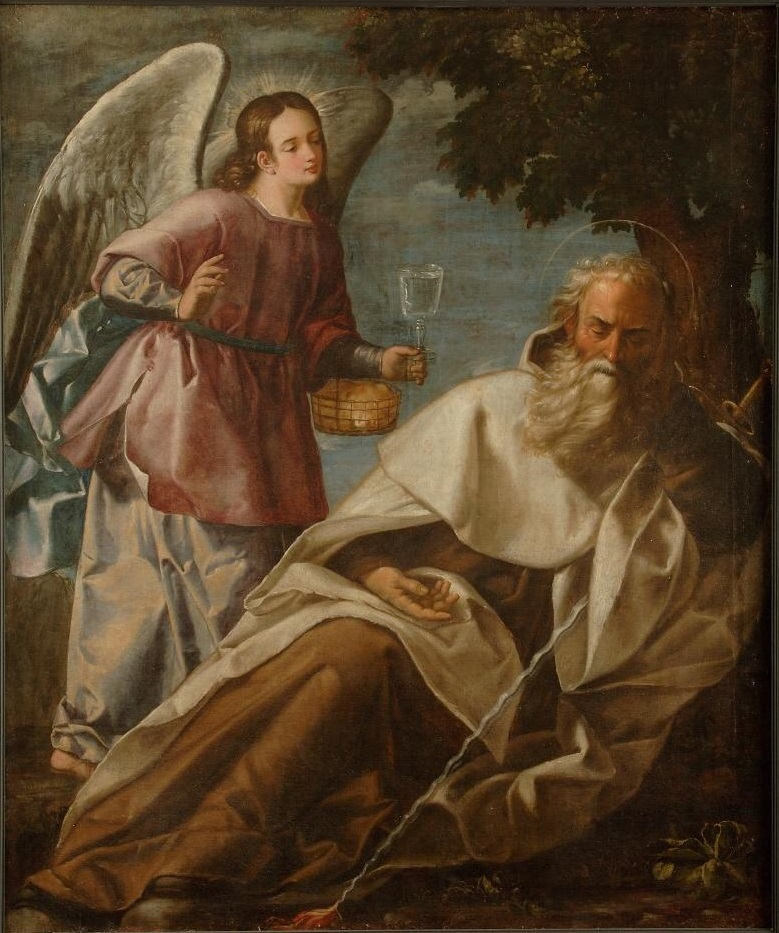
A Catholic painting of the Prophet Elías in the desert, confronted by an angel. He is shown in the habit of a Carmelite friar.

In Catholicism, Elijah receives particular reverence among the Carmelites as their spiritual Father and traditional founder. In addition to taking their name from Mount Carmel, where the first hermits of the order established themselves, both the Carmelites of the Ancient Observance and the Discalced Carmelites have traditions pertaining to Elijah which focus upon the prophet's withdrawal from public life. The medieval Carmelite Book of the First Monks offers some insight into the heart of both orders' contemplative vocation and reverence for the prophet. In 1725, the Holy See in the reign of Pope Benedict XIII allowed the Carmelites to place a statue of the Prophet Elias in St. Peter's Basilica, which denoted him as their founder.

In the 17th century the Bollandist Society, whose declared aim was to search and classify materials concerning saints venerated by the Church, and to print what seemed to be the most reliable sources of information entered into controversy with the Carmelites on this point. In writing of Saint Albert, Patriarch of Jerusalem and author of the Carmelite Rule, the Bollandist Daniel Papebroch stated that the attribution of Carmelite origin to Elijah was insufficiently grounded. The Carmelites reacted strongly, thus each side issued a series of letters, pamphlets, and other documents from 1681 to 1698. The Carmelites were supported by a Spanish tribunal, while the Bollandists had the support of Jean de Launoy and the Sorbonne. In November 1698, Pope Innocent XII ordered an end to the controversy.

==== Liturgical commemorations ====
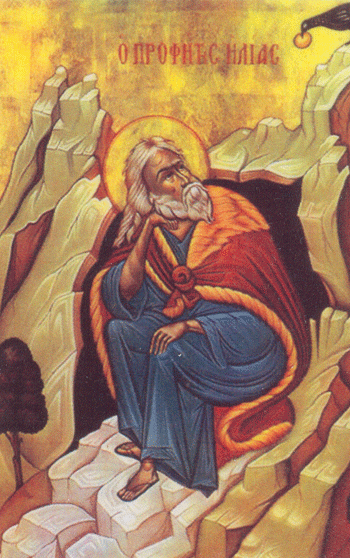
Elias on Mount Horeb, as depicted in a Greek Orthodox icon

Since most Eastern Churches either use Greek as their liturgical language or translated their liturgies from the Greek, Elias (or its modern iotacized form Ilias) is the form of the prophet's name used among most members of the Eastern Orthodox Church and those Eastern Catholic Churches which follow the Byzantine Rite.

The feast day of Saint Elias falls on 20 July of the Orthodox liturgical calendar (for those churches which follow the traditional Julian Calendar, 20 July currently falls on 2 August of the modern Gregorian Calendar). This day is a major holiday in Lebanon and is one of a handful of holidays there whose celebration is accompanied by a launching of fireworks by the general public. The full name of St. Elias in Lebanon translates to St. Elias the Living because it is believed that he did not die but rode his fiery chariot to heaven. The reference to the fiery chariot is likely why the Lebanese celebrate this holiday with fireworks.

Elias is also commemorated, together with all of the righteous persons of the Old Testament, on the Sunday of the Holy Forefathers (the Sunday before the Nativity of the Lord).

The Apolytikion in the Fourth Tone for St. Elias:

The incarnate Angel, the Cornerstone of the Prophets, the second Forerunner of the Coming of Christ, the glorious Elias, who from above, sent down to Elisha the grace to dispel sickness and cleanse lepers, abounds therefore in healing for those who honor him.

The Kontakion in the Second Tone for St. Elias:

O Prophet and foreseer of the great works of God, O greatly renowned Elias, who by your word held back the clouds of rain, intercede for us to the only Loving One.

==== The Church of Jesus Christ of Latter-day Saints ====
The Church of Jesus Christ of Latter-day Saints acknowledges Elijah as a prophet. The Church teaches that the Malachi prophecy of the return of Elijah was fulfilled on 3 April 1836, when Elijah visited the prophet and founder of the church, Joseph Smith, along with Oliver Cowdery, in the Kirtland Temple as a resurrected being. This event is chronicled in Doctrine and Covenants 110:13–16. This experience forms the basis for the church's focus on genealogy and family history and belief in the eternal nature of marriage and families.

In Latter-day Saint theology, the name-title Elias is not always synonymous with Elijah and is often used for people other than the biblical prophet. According to Joseph Smith,

The spirit of Elias is first, Elijah second, and Messiah last. Elias is a forerunner to prepare the way, and the spirit and power of Elijah is to come after, holding the keys of power, building the Temple to the capstone, placing the seals of the Melchizedek Priesthood upon the house of Israel, and making all things ready; then Messiah comes to His Temple, which is last of all.

People to whom the title Elias is applied in the Church's theology include Noah, the angel Gabriel (who is considered to be the same person as Noah in the Church's doctrine), Elijah, John the Baptist, John the Apostle, and an unspecified man who was a contemporary of Abraham.

Detractors of Latter-day Saint faith have often alleged that Smith, in whose time and place the King James Version was the only available English translation of the Bible, simply failed to grasp the fact that the Elijah of the Old Testament and the Elias of the New Testament are the same person. Latter-day Saints deny this and say that the difference they make between the two is deliberate and prophetic. The names Elias and Elijah refer to one who prepares the way for the coming of the Lord. This is applicable to John the Baptist coming to prepare the way for the Lord and His baptism; it also refers to Elijah appearing during the transfiguration to prepare for Jesus by restoring keys of sealing power. Jesus then gave this power to the Twelve saying, "Verily I say unto you, Whatsoever ye shall bind on earth shall be bound in heaven: and whatsoever ye shall loose on earth shall be loosed in heaven."

== Pagan associations and mountaintops ==
Starting in the fifth century, Elias is often connected with Helios, the Sun. The two words have very similar pronunciations in Postclassical Greek; Elijah rode in his chariot of fire to heaven just as Helios drove the chariot of the sun across the sky; and the holocaust sacrifice offered by Elijah and burned by fire from heaven corresponds to the sun warming the earth.

Sedulius writes poetically in the fifth century that the "bright path to glittering heaven" suits Elias both "in merits and name", as changing one letter makes his name "Helios"; but he does not identify the two. A homily entitled De ascensione Heliae, misattributed to Chrysostom, claims that poets and painters use the ascension of Elijah as a model for their depictions of the sun, and says that "Elijah is really Helios". Saint Patrick appears to conflate Helios and Elias. In modern times, much Greek folklore also connects Elias with the sun.

In Greece, chapels and monasteries dedicated to Prophet Elias (Προφήτης Ηλίας) are often found on mountaintops, which themselves are often named after him. Since Wachsmuth (1864), the usual explanation for this has been that Elias was identified with Helios, who had mountaintop shrines. But few shrines of Helios were on mountaintops, and sun-worship was subsumed by Apollo-worship by Christian times, and so could not be confused with Elias. The modern folklore is not good evidence for the origin of the association of the sun, Elias, and mountaintops. Perhaps Elias is simply a "natural patron of high places".

The association of Elias with mountaintops seems to come from a different pagan tradition: Elias took on the attributes and the locales associated with Zeus, especially his associations with mountains and his powers over rain, thunder, lightning, and wind. When Elias prevailed over the priests of Baal, it was on Mount Carmel which later became known as Mount St. Elias. When he spent forty days in a cave, it was on Mount Horeb. When Elias confronted Ahab, he stopped the rains for three years.

A map of mountain-cults of Zeus shows that most of these sites are now dedicated to Elias, including Mount Olympus, Mount Lykaion, Mount Arachnaion, and Mount Taleton on the mainland, and Mount Kenaion, Mount Oche, and Mount Kynados in the islands. Of these, the only one with a recorded tradition of a Helios cult is Mount Taleton.

Elias is associated with pre-Christian lightning gods in many other European traditions.

Among Albanians, pilgrimages are made to mountaintops to ask for rain during the summer. One such tradition gaining popularity is the 2 August pilgrimage to Ljuboten on the Sharr mountains. Muslims refer to this day as Aligjyn ("Ali Day"), and it is believed that Ali becomes Elias at midday.

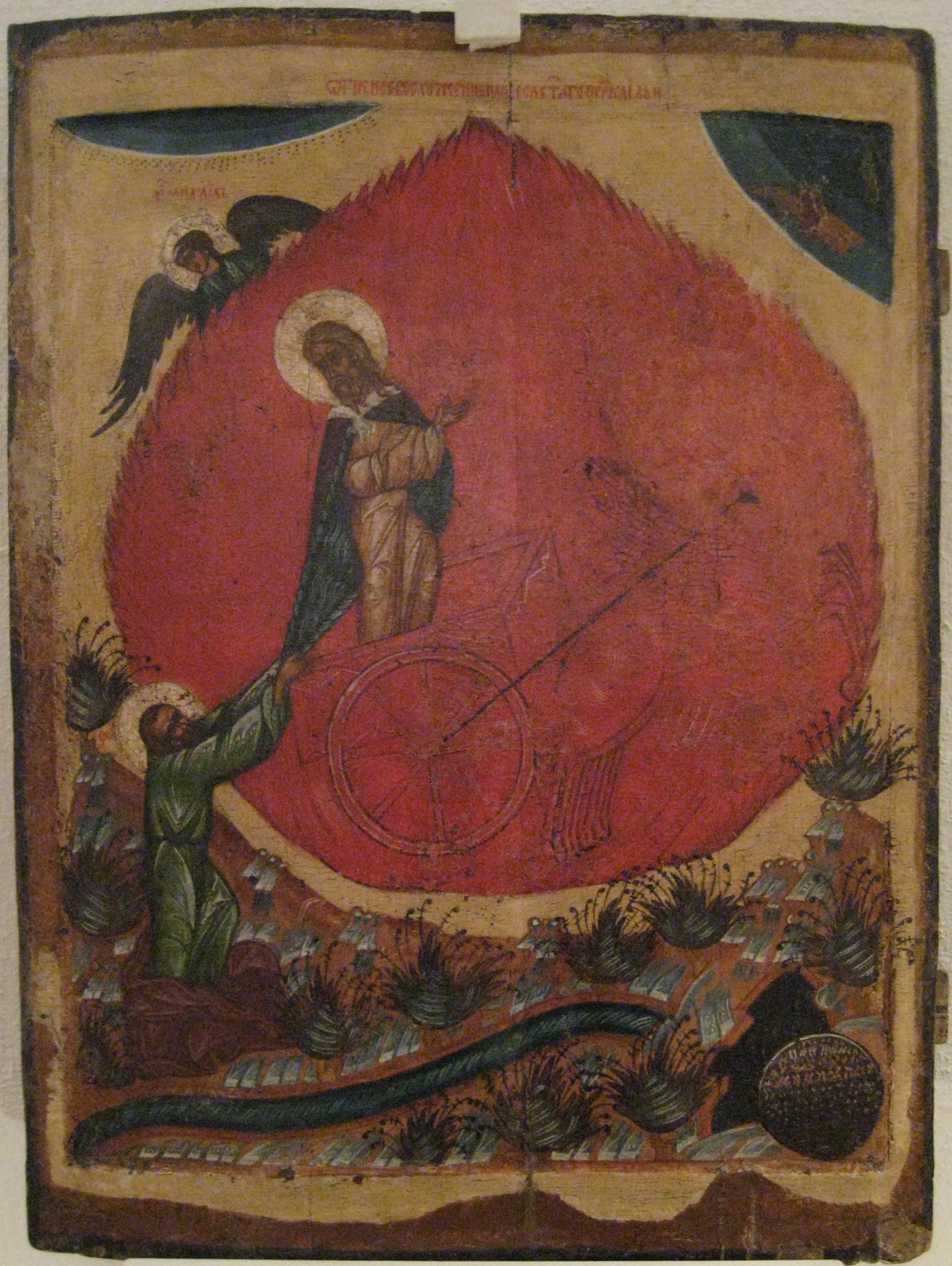
This common depiction of the prophet Elijah riding a flaming chariot across the sky resulted in syncretistic folklore among the Slavs incorporating pre-Christian motifs in the beliefs and rites regarding him in Slavic culture.

As Elijah was described as ascending into heaven in a fiery chariot, the Christian missionaries who converted Slavic tribes likely found him an ideal analogy for Perun, the supreme Slavic god of storms, thunder and lightning bolts. In many Slavic countries Elijah is known as "Elijah the Thunderer" (Ilija Gromovnik), who drives the heavens in a chariot and administers rain and snow, thus actually taking the place of Perun in popular beliefs. Perun is also sometimes conflated with the legendary hero Elijah of Murom. The feast of St. Elias is known as Ilinden in South Slavic, and was chosen as the day of the Ilinden-Preobrazhenie Uprising in 1903; it is now observed as Republic Day in North Macedonia.

In Estonian folklore Elijah is considered to be the successor of Ukko, the lightning spirit.

In Georgian mythology, he replaces Elwa. A Georgian story about Elijah:

Once Jesus, the prophet Elijah, and St. George were going through Georgia. When they became tired and hungry they stopped to dine. They saw a Georgian shepherd and decided to ask him to feed them. First, Elijah went up to the shepherd and asked him for a sheep. After the shepherd asked his identity Elijah said that, he was the one who sent him rain to get him a good profit from farming. The shepherd became angry at him and told him that he was the one who also sent thunderstorms, which destroyed the farms of poor widows. (After Elijah, Jesus and St. George attempt to get help and eventually succeed).

Among other peoples of the Caucasus, including the Ossetians and Kabardians, Elijah is understood as a kind of thunder-divinity named Uac-illa, Ilia, or Yeli, and was traditionally invoked in "choppa" ritual associated with lightning strikes and certain mental illnesses. If a person or animal was struck by lightning, a circle dance was performed immediately around the site, even if the storm was still ongoing, and Elijah's name was invoked alongside a nonsense word "choppa" or "coppay". If the victim had died, their family were forbidden from grieving and were required to bury them where they fell instead of in the village cemetery. If the victim survived, their lives were dedicated to Elijah: human survivors were prophets, while animals were released with a mark so that others would know not to take them home. In other versions of this tradition, the one venerated was not Elijah, but other traditional thunder-divinities like Shyble (Щыблэ), Afy (Афы), or Antswa (Анцуа).

Elias has other pagan associations: a modern legend about Elias mirrors precisely the legend of Odysseus seeking a place where the locals would not recognize an oar—hence the mountaintops.

== In Islam ==
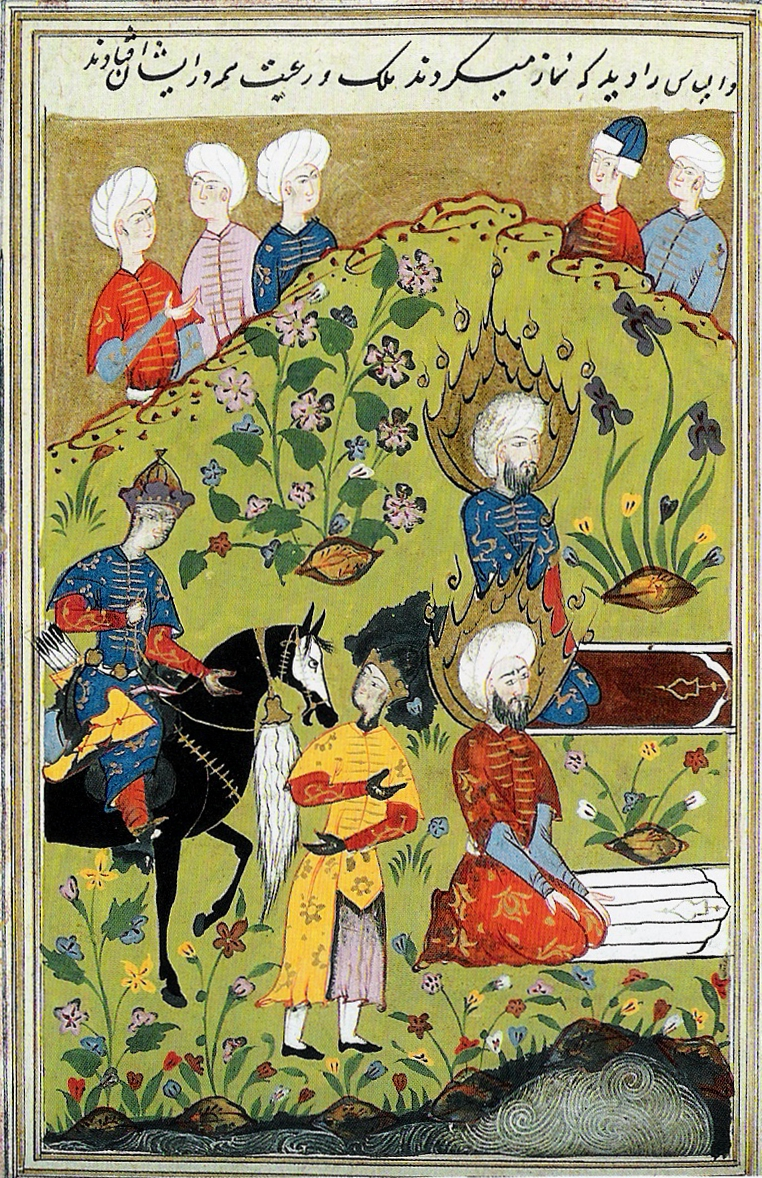
Khizr and Elijah Praying in Mecca; Persian miniature from an illuminated manuscript of Stories of the Prophets (c. 427 AH/ 1036 AD)

Elijah (Arabic: إلياس, romanized: Ilyās) is mentioned as a prophet in Quran 6:85. Elijah's narrative in Muslim tradition and Tafsir resembles closely that in the Hebrew Bible and Muslim literature records Elijah's primary prophesying as taking place during the reign of Ahab and Jezebel as well as Ahaziah. (Note: "Elias is the same as Elijah, whose story will be found in the Old Testament in 1 Kings 17–19 and 2 Kings 1–2. Elijah lived in the reign of Ahab (896–874 BC) and Ahaziah (874–872 BC), kings of the (northern) kingdom of Israel or Samaria. He was a prophet of the desert, like John the Baptist, unlike our holy Prophet, who took part in, controlled, and guided all the affairs of his people. Both Ahab and Azariah were prone to lapse into the worship of Baal, the sun-god worshipped in Syria. That worship also included the worship of nature-powers and procreative powers, as in the Hindu worship of the Lingam, and led to many abuses. King Ahab had married a princess of Sidon, Jezebel, a wicked woman who led her husband to forsake Allah and adopt Baal-worship." ... "Elijah denounced all Ahab's sins as well as the sins of Ahaziah and had to flee for his life. Eventually, according to the Old Testament, he was taken up in a whirlwind to heaven in a chariot of fire after he had left his mantle with Elisha the prophet.") He is seen by Muslims to be the prophetic predecessor to Elisha. While neither the Bible nor the Quran mentions the genealogy of Elijah, some scholars of Islam believe he may have come from the priestly family of the prophet Aaron. While Elijah is associated with Islamic eschatology, Islam views Jesus as the Messiah. Elijah's figure has been identified with a number of other prophets and saints, including Idris, which is believed by some scholars to have been another name for Elijah, and the figure Khidr. Islamic legend later developed the figure of Elijah, greatly embellishing upon his attributes, and some late apocryphal literature gave Elijah the status of a half-human, half-angel. Elijah also appears in later works of literature, including the Hamzanama.

=== Quran ===
Elijah is mentioned in the Quran, where his preaching is recounted in a concise manner. The Quran narrates that Elijah told his people to come to the worship of God and to leave the worship of Baal, the primary idol of the area. The Quran states, "And Elias was indeed one of the messengers. ˹Remember˺ when he said to his people, "Will you not fear ˹Allah˺? Do you call upon ˹the idol of˺ Ba'l and abandon the Best of Creators— Allah, your Lord and the Lord of your forefathers?" "

The Quran makes it clear that the majority of Elijah's people denied the prophet and continued to follow idolatry. However, it mentions that a small number of devoted servants of God among them followed Elijah and believed in and worshiped God. The Quran states, "But they rejected him, so they will certainly be brought ˹for punishment˺. But not the chosen servants of Allah. We blessed him ˹with honourable mention˺ among later generations: "

In the Quran, God praises Elijah in two places:

"Peace be upon Elias." Indeed, this is how We reward the good-doers. He was truly one of Our faithful servants.

— Surah As-Saaffat 37:130–132

Likewise, We guided Zachariah, John, Jesus, and Elias, who were all of the righteous.

— Surah Al-An'am 6:85

Numerous commentators have offered commentary on Al-An'am 6:85 saying that Elijah, Zechariah, John the Baptist and Jesus were all spiritually connected. Abdullah Yusuf Ali says

The third group consists not of men of action, but Preachers of Truth, who led solitary lives. Their epithet is: 'the Righteous.' They form a connected group round Jesus. Zachariah was the father of John the Baptist, who is referenced as "Elias, which was for to come" (Matt 11:14); and Elias is said to have been present and talked to Jesus at the Transfiguration on the Mount (Matt. 17:3).

=== Literature and tradition ===
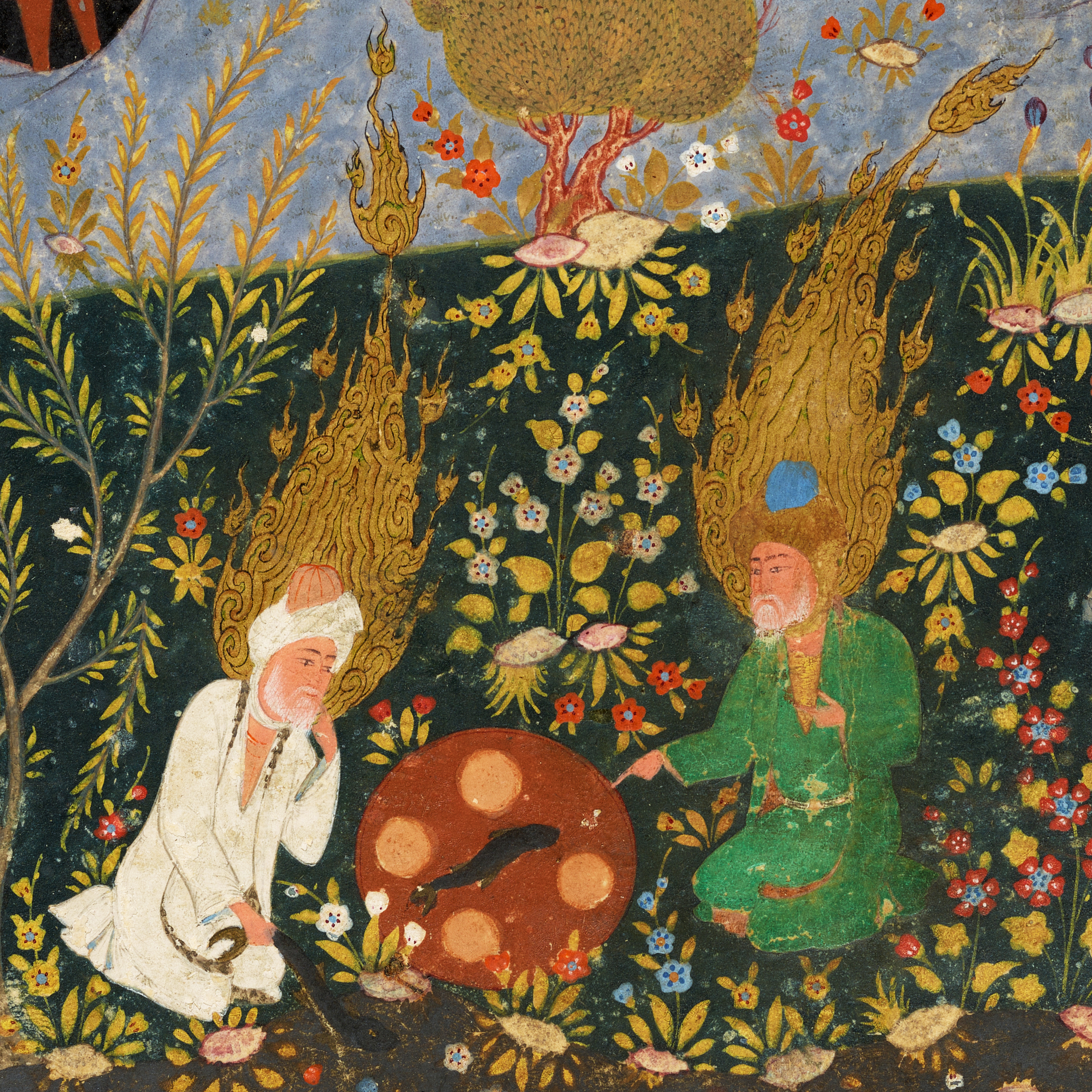
Islamic miniature of Ilyas (left) and fellow Islamic prophet Khidr sit together at the fountain of youth.

Muslim literature and tradition recounts that Elijah preached to the Kingdom of Israel, ruled over by Ahab and later his son Ahaziah. He is believed to have been a "prophet of the desert—like John the Baptist". Elijah is believed to have preached with zeal to Ahab and his wife Jezebel, who according to Muslim tradition was partly responsible for the worship of false idols in this area. Muslims believe that it was because the majority of people refused to listen to Elijah that Elisha had to continue preaching the message of God to Israel after him.

Elijah has been the subject of legends and folktales in Muslim culture, usually involving his meeting with Khidr, and in one legend, with Muhammad himself. In Islamic mysticism, Elijah is associated closely with the sage Khidr. One hadith reported that Elijah and Khidr met together every year in Jerusalem to go on the pilgrimage to Mecca. Elijah appears also in the Hamzanama numerous times, where he is spoken of as being the brother of Khidr as well as one who drank from the Fountain of Youth.

Further, It is narrated in Kitab al-Kafi that Imam Ja'far al-Sadiq was reciting the prostration of Ilyas (Elijah) in the Syrian language and began to weep. He then translated the supplication in Arabic to a group of visiting scholars:

"O Lord, will I find that you punish me although you know of my thirst in the heat of midday? Will I find that you punish me although you know that I rub my face on Earth to worship you? Will I find that you punish me although you know that I give up sins for you? Will I find that you punish me although you know that I stay awake all night just for you?" To which Allah then inspired to Ilyas, "Raise your head from the Earth for I will not punish you".

Although most Muslim scholars believed that Elijah preached in Israel, some early commentators on the Quran stated that Elijah was sent to Baalbek, in Lebanon. Scholars have rejected this claim, stating that the connection of the city with Elijah would have been made because of the first half of the city's name, that of Baal, which was the deity that Elijah exhorted his people to stop worshiping. Scholars who reject identification of Elijah's town with Baalbek further argue that the town of Baalbek is not mentioned with the narrative of Elijah in either the Quran or the Hebrew Bible.

== In Druze religion ==
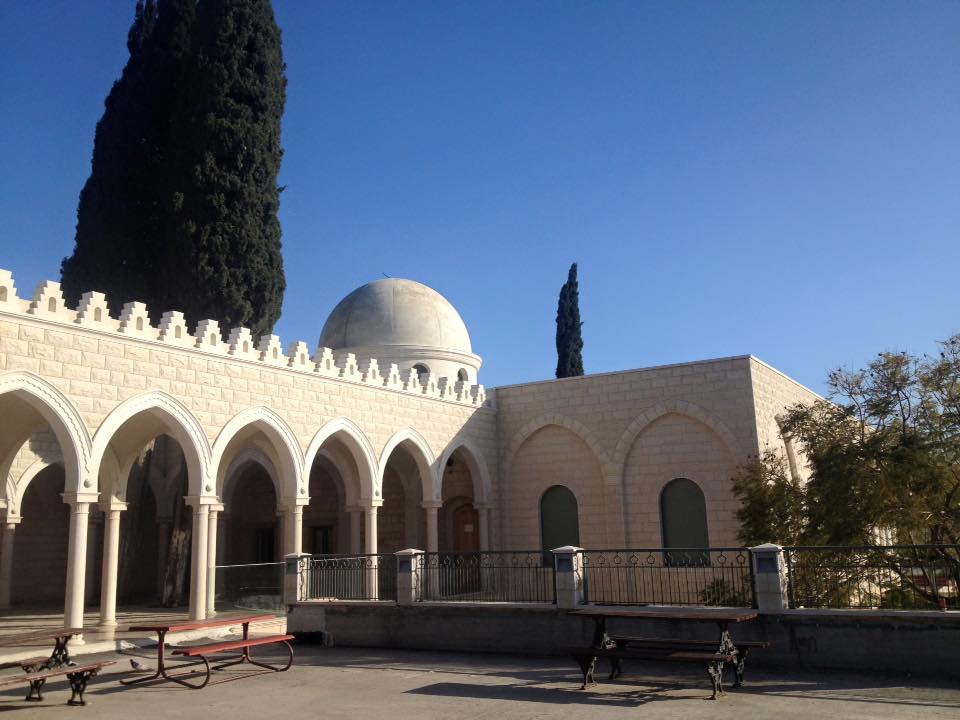
The Druze maqam Al-Khidr in Kafr Yasif, Israel

Druze tradition honors several "mentors" and "prophets", and Elijah is honored as a prophet. Elijah is considered a central figure in Druze. And due to his importance in the religion, the settlement of Druzes on Mount Carmel had partly to do with Elijah's story and devotion. There are two large Druze towns on the eastern slopes of Mount Carmel: Daliyat al-Karmel and Isfiya. The Druze regard the Cave of Elijah as holy, and they identify Elijah as "al-Khidr", the green prophet who symbolizes water and life, a miracle who cures the sick. He and Jethro (Shuaib) are considered patron saints of the Druze people.

Druze, like some Christians, believe that Elijah returned as John the Baptist, since they believe in reincarnation and the transmigration of the soul, Druze believe al-Khidr and John the Baptist are one and the same, along with Saint George.

Due to the Christian influence on the Druze faith, two Christian saints become the Druze's favorite venerated figures: Saint George and Saint Elijah. Thus, in all the villages inhabited by Druze and Christians in central Mount Lebanon a Christian church or Druze maqam is dedicated to either one of them. According to scholar Ray Jabre Mouawad the Druze appreciated the two saints for their bravery: Saint George because he confronted the dragon and Elijah because he competed with the pagan priests of Baal and won over them. In both cases the explanations provided by Christians is that Druzes were attracted to warrior saints that resemble their own militarized society.

== In the Baháʼí Faith ==
In the Baháʼí Faith, the Báb, founder of the Bábí faith, is believed to be the return of Elijah and John the Baptist. Both Elijah and John the Baptist are considered to be Lesser Prophets, whose stations are below that of a Manifestation of God like Jesus Christ, Buddha, the Báb or Bahá'u'lláh. The Báb is buried in his shrine on the slope of Mount Carmel, where Elijah had his confrontation with the prophets of Baal.

== Controversies ==
=== Miracle of the ravens ===
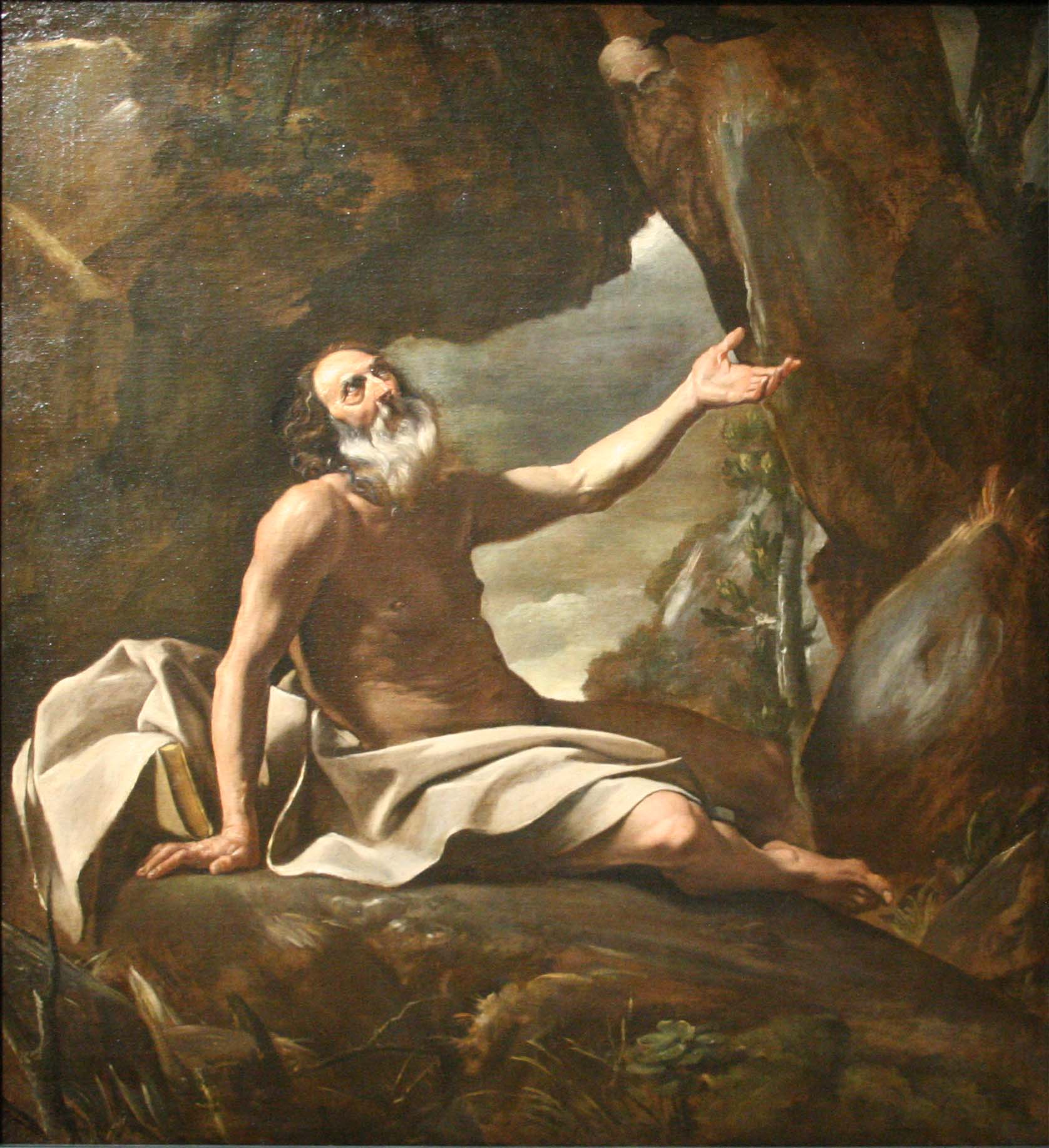
Elijah fed by the ravens, by Giovanni Lanfranco, Musée des beaux-arts de Marseille

That ravens fed Elijah by the brook Chorath has been questioned. The Hebrew text at 1 Kings 17:4–6 uses the word עֹרְבִים `ōrvīm, which means ravens, but with a different vocalization might equally mean Arabs. The Septuagint has κορακες, ravens, and other traditional translations followed.

Alternatives have been proposed for many years; for example Adam Clarke (d. 1832) treated it as a discussion already of long standing. Objections to the traditional translation are that ravens are ritually unclean as well as physically dirty; it is difficult to imagine any method of delivery of the food which is not disgusting. The parallelism with the incident that follows, where Elijah is fed by the widow, also suggests a human, if mildly improbable, agent.

Prof. John Gray chooses Arabs, saying "We adopt this reading solely because of its congruity with the sequel, where Elijah is fed by an alien Phoenician woman." His translation of the verses in question is:

And the word of YHWH came to Elijah saying, Go hence and turn eastward and hide thyself in the Wadi Chorath east of the Jordan, and it shall be that thou shalt drink of the wadi, and I have commanded the Arabs to feed thee there. And he went and did according to the word of YHWH and went and dwelt in the Wadi Chorath east of the Jordan. And the Arabs brought him bread in the morning and flesh in the evening and he would drink of the wadi.

=== Fire on Mount Carmel ===
The challenge to the priests of Baal had the two-fold purpose of demonstrating that the God of Israel was greater than Baal, and that it was he who was the giver of rain. According to J. Robinson, "Some scholars have suggested that the pouring of water was a piece of sympathetic magic."

Hugo Gressmann suggested that the fire that destroyed the offering and altar was lightning, while Ferdinand Hitzig and others thought the water poured on the sacrifice and into the ditch might have been flammable naphtha. Baptist scholar H. H. Rowley rejects both views. Robinson dismisses the suggestion of naphtha with the view that the priests of Baal would have been aware of the properties of naphtha. Julian Morgenstern rejects the idea of sympathetic magic, but supports the interpretation of white naphtha possibly ignited by a glass or mirror to focus the sun's rays, citing other mentions of sacred fire, as in 2 Maccabees 1:18–22.

=== Ascension into the heavens ===
Elijah's name typically occurs in Jewish lists of those who have entered heaven alive.

In the Gospel of John, Jesus says: "And no man hath ascended up to heaven, but he that came down from heaven, [even] the Son of man which is in heaven." Traditionally Christianity interprets the "Son of Man" as a title of Jesus, but this has never been an article of faith and there are other interpretations. Further interpreting this quote, some Christians believe that Elijah was not assumed into heaven but simply transferred to another assignment either in heaven or with King Jehoram of Judah.

The question of whether Elijah was in heaven or elsewhere on earth depends partly on the view of the letter Jehoram received from Elijah in 2 Chronicles 21:12 after Elijah had ascended. Some have suggested that the letter was written before Elijah ascended, but only delivered later. The rabbinical Seder Olam explains that the letter was delivered seven years after his ascension. This is also a possible explanation for some variation in manuscripts of Josephus' Antiquities of the Jews when dealing with this issue. Others have argued that Elijah was only "caught away" such as Philip in Acts 8 (Note: "There is evidence that Elijah was back on earth after he was taken away in the whirlwind: It can be shown that a letter was received by Jehoram, King of Judah, from Elijah, after Elijah was taken to heaven. Either the letter was written before he went to heaven and delivered by a messenger on earth (unlikely), or Elijah was "caught away" as was Philip from the Gaza Road to Azotas, (about 17 miles,) for an unspecified purpose and returned to the earth. Consider the evidence: 1. Elijah had been taken to heaven in a whirlwind.; 2. Elisha had taken over the duties of Elijah in the reign of Jehoshaphat.; 3. Jehoram received a letter from Elijah, the prophet. King Jehoram reigned after Jehoshaphat.) John Lightfoot reasoned that it must have been a different Elijah.

=== Return ===
The Jewish nation awaits the coming of Elijah to precede the coming of the Messiah.

For Christians, this prophecy was fulfilled in the gospel. After Elijah appears during the Transfiguration alongside Moses, Jesus explains to his disciples that John the Baptist, recently beheaded by Herod Antipas, had fulfilled Elijah's return. Commentators have said that Moses' appearance represented the law, while Elijah's appearance represented the prophets. The Church of Jesus Christ of Latter-day Saints believes that Elijah returned on 3 April 1836 in an appearance to Joseph Smith and Oliver Cowdery, fulfilling the prophecy in Malachi.

The Baháʼí Faith believes Elijah returned as the biblical prophet John the Baptist and as the Báb who founded the Bábí Faith in 1844. Druze, like Baháʼí Faith believes, believe that Elijah came back as John the Baptist.

The American founded Nation of Islam believes Elijah returned as Elijah Muhammad, black separatist religious leader (who claimed to be a "messenger", not a prophet). This is considered less important than their belief that Allah himself showed up in the person of Fard Muhammad, the founder of the group. It differs notably from most beliefs about Elijah, in that his re-appearance is usually the precursor to a greater one's appearance, rather than an afterthought.

== In arts and literature ==
- Perhaps the best-known representation of the story of Elijah is Felix Mendelssohn's oratorio "Elijah". The oratorio chronicles many episodes of Elijah's life, including his challenge to Ahab and the contest of the gods, the miracle of raising the dead, and his ascension into heaven. Composed and premiered in 1846, the oratorio was criticized by members of the New German School but nonetheless remains one of the most popular Romantic choral-orchestral works in the repertoire.
- In his ethnography Waiting for Elijah: Time and Encounter in a Bosnian Landscape, anthropologist Safet HadžiMuhamedović discusses the syncretic harvest feast of Elijah's Day (Ilindan/Aliđun), shared by Christians and Muslims throughout Bosnia. He focuses on the Field of Gacko in the southeastern Bosnian highlands. Starting with a well-known Bosnian proverb about Elijah's two names "Ilija until noon – Alija after noon" (Do podne Ilija, od podne Alija), HadžiMuhamedović discusses the traditional and postwar waiting for Elijah, as well as the plethora of other characters he merges with (e.g. Slavic deity Perun and prophet Khidr). As the central trope in the book, the waiting for Elijah becomes the waiting for the restoration of home and cosmology after nationalist violence. The absence of Elijah is reminiscent of the one in Jewish rituals and HadžiMuhamedović discovers an imaginative form of political resistance in the waiting for Elijah's return.
- In Orlando Furioso, the English knight Astolfo flies up to the moon in Elijah's flaming chariot.
- Elijah Rock is a traditional Christian spiritual about Elijah, also sometimes used by Jewish youth groups.
- "Go Like Elijah" is a song by the American rock-pop-jazz songwriter Chi Coltrane.
- Lorenzetto created a statue of Elijah with assistance of the young sculptor Raffaello da Montelupo, using designs by Raphael.
- The Fifth Mountain by Paulo Coelho is based on the story of Elijah.
- Christian metal band Disciple released the song "God of Elijah" on their 2001 album By God. The theme of the song is the challenge Elijah placed against Ahab between Baal and the god of Israel.
- The roots-fusion band Seatrain records, on the albums of the same name (1970), band member Peter Rowans song "Waiting for Elijah", alluding to Elijah's second coming.
- From 1974 to 1976 Philip K. Dick believed himself to be possessed by the spirit of Elijah. He later included Elijah (as Elias Tate) in his novel The Divine Invasion.
- On Ryan Adams' 2005 album 29, the song "Voices" speaks of Elijah, alluding to Elijah being the prophet of destruction.
- Journeys With Elijah: Eight Tales of the Prophet, book by Barbara Goldin and illustrated by Jerry Pinkney
- In 1996, Robin Mark created a praise song entitled "Days of Elijah".
- Cormac McCarthy's post-apocalyptic novel The Road (2006) features an old man who ambiguously refers to himself as Ely.
- Elijah ("Lije") is the name of the protagonist in three novels of Isaac Asimov's Robot series. He is familiar with biblical stories and sometimes relates them in the narrative or in discussion with his robot partner who was built in a world devoid of religion. His wife is ironically named Jezebel.
- The popular movie Chariots of Fire alludes to the William Blake poem And did those feet in ancient time, which in turn alludes to the Elijah story.
- Elijah was played by John Hoyt in the 1953 film Sins of Jezebel.
- A series of paintings by Clive Hicks-Jenkins c. 2003–2007 depicted Elijah being fed by a raven, inspired by fragments of a Tuscan altarpiece in Christ Church Picture Gallery in Oxford.
- Referenced in the song "It Was Written", by Damian Marley, featuring Capleton and Drag-On.
- Referenced in the movie The Book of Eli, starring Denzel Washington in the title role as the man on a mission in a post-apocalyptic world to deliver the Bible for safe-keeping.
- I. L. Peretz wrote The Magician, which was illustrated by Marc Chagall in 1917, about Elijah.
- Early in Moby-Dick, Ishmael and Queequeg run into a scarred and deformed man named Elijah, a prophet (or perhaps merely a frightening stranger) who hints to them the perils of signing aboard Ahab's ship, the Pequod.
- Elijah appears in psychologist Carl Jung's "Red Book" as one of central book heroes.

== See also ==
- Biblical narratives and the Quran
- Eli (name)
- Qisas Al-Anbiya (Stories of The Prophets)
- St. Elijah's Church (disambiguation), for churches dedicated to Elijah
- Theophoric name
- Two witnesses

== Bibliography ==
- Elijah: Prophet of Carmel, by Jane Ackerman, ICS Publications, 2003. ISBN 0-935216-30-8
- Landesmann, Peter (2004). Die Himmelfahrt des Elija. Entstehen und Weiterleben einer Legende sowie ihre Darstellung in der frühchristlichen Kunst [The Ascension of Elijah. The emergence and survival of a legend and its depiction in early Christian art]. Wien: Böhlau, ISBN 3-205-77184-2.

=== Anthropology ===
- HadžiMuhamedović, S. Waiting for Elijah: Time and Encounter in a Bosnian Landscape. New York and Oxford: Berghahn Books. ISBN 978-1-78533-856-4

=== History ===
- Miller, J. M. and J. H. Hayes. A History of Ancient Israel and Judah. Louisville, KY: Westminster John Knox Press, 2004. ISBN 0-664-22358-3

=== Folklore and tradition ===
- Bialik, H. N. and Y. H Ravnitzky. eds. The Book of Legends: Sefer Ha-Aggadah. New York: Schocken Books, 1992. ISBN 0-8052-4113-2
- Ginzberg, Lewis. Legends of the Bible. Philadelphia: Jewish Publication Society of America, 1956.
- Schwartz, Howard. Tree of Souls: The Mythology of Judaism. Oxford: Oxford University Press, 2004. ISBN 0-19-508679-1
- Wolfson, Ron and Joel L. Grishaver. Passover: The Family Guide to Spiritual Celebration. Woodstock, VT: Jewish Lights Publishing, 2003. ISBN 1-58023-174-8
- Négrier, Patrick. Elie & Elisée, KDP Editions 2024, Amazon.fr

=== Children's literature ===
- Aronin, Ben and Shay Rieger. The Secret of the Sabbath Fish. Philadelphia: Jewish Publication Society of America, 1978. ISBN 0-8276-0110-7
- Goldin, Barbara. Journeys with Elijah: Eight Tales of the Prophet. New York: Harcourt Brace, 1999. ISBN 0-15-200445-9
- Jaffe, Nina. The Mysterious Visitor: Stories of the Prophet Elijah. New York: Scholastic Press, 1997. ISBN 0-590-48422-2
- Jaffe, Nina. The Way Meat Loves Salt: A Cinderella Tale from the Jewish Tradition. New York: Holt Publishing, 1998. ISBN 0-8050-4384-5
- Silverman, Erica. Gittel's Hands. Mahwah, NJ: BridgeWater Books, 1996. ISBN 0-8167-3798-3
- Sydelle, Pearl. Elijah's Tears: Stories for the Jewish Holidays. New York: Holt Publishing, 1996. ISBN 0-8050-4627-5
- Thaler, Mike. Elijah, Prophet Sharing: and Other Bible Stories to Tickle Your Soul. Colorado Springs, CO: Faith Kids Publishing, 2000. ISBN 0-7814-3512-9
- Scheck, Joann. The Water That Caught On Fire. St. Louis, Missouri: Concordia Publishing House: ARCH Books, 1969. (59–1159)

=== Christian literature ===
- Friedrich Justus Knecht (1910). "God raises up Prophets. — Mission of the Prophet Elias" . A Practical Commentary on Holy Scripture. B. Herder.

=== References in the Qur'an ===
- Mission of Elijah: 37:123–126, 37:127–129
- Praise for Elijah: 6:85, 37:130–132
