= Tishbe =

Biblical town

Tishbe, sometimes transliterated as Thisbe, is a town mentioned in the Hebrew Bible's First Book of Kings, 1 Kings 17:1, as the residence and possibly even birthplace of the prophet Elijah, known as the Tishbite (see that page for discussion of the term). It is placed by the biblical text in the historical region of Gilead, now in the western part of modern-day Jordan. However, the toponym may denominate another location, as discussed below.

== Demonym or descriptor? ==
Many of the Hebrew prophets are introduced with the name of their father, their original place of residence, or both. For instance, Jonah is introduced as "Jonah, the son of Amittai... of Gath-hepher", Elisha is introduced as "Elisha, the son of Shaphat, of Abel-meholah", Micah is introduced as "Micah the Morashtite", etc. Elijah, in turn, is introduced as "Elijah the Tishbite, of the settlers of Gilead." When considering the general pattern of how prophets are first introduced in the text of the Hebrew Bible, it would seem the passage is a simple statement of Elijah's origins.

Because the original Hebrew words for "Tishbite" (תִּשְׁבִּי, tīšbī) and "settlers" (תֹּשָׁבֵי, tōšāḇē) are strikingly similar, some scholars have questioned whether tīšbī is actually a demonym for a place called "Tishbe", or if it is a form of the word "settler" conjugated to match Elijah – thereby reading "Elijah the settler" rather than "Elijah the Tishbite". The word tīšbī appears just six times in the Hebrew Bible, each time in conjunction with Elijah's own name, but no place called "Tishbe" appears throughout the entire Tanakh. Therefore, it is debated whether or not the text is indicating Elijah hailed from a place called Tishbe, or that he originated from amongst settlers in the Gilead.

== Possible locations ==
=== Tishbe in Gilead ===
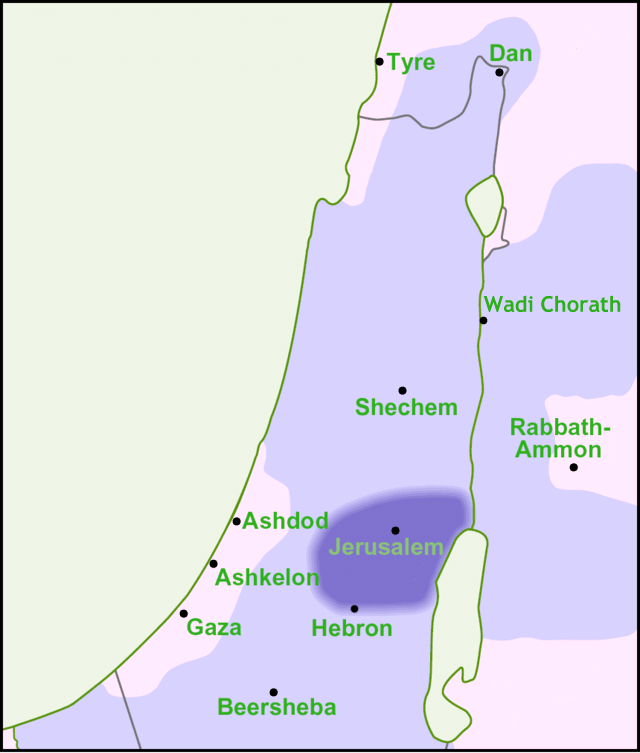
Tishbe: the likely location near the stream of Chorath, identified here with today's Wadi al-Yabis

1 Kings 17:1 indicates that Elijah was from Tishbe in Gilead, which is a historical region located east of the Jordan River in present Jordan. The Jewish ancient historian Josephus supposed that Tishbe was in Gilead. The eastern half of the Israelite Tribe of Manasseh and, possibly also, the Tribe of Gad, have been in possession of Gilead; therefore Tishbe was probably in the territory of the eastern half of Manasseh, or possibly in that of Gad. According to Pfeiffer and Vos, it is located in the territory of Manasseh, in proximity to the wadi known from the Bible as Cherith, in present-day Jordan.

Tishbe has for a long time been identified as the historical town of Listib in Gilead, due to its location and the similarity between the ancient Hebrew name and the Arabic name, "el-Istib", but the 1915 International Standard Bible Encyclopedia refutes the identification because el-Istib has only been established during the Byzantine period. The ruins of Listib are located 13 kilometres north of the Jabbok River in Gilead, known in Arabic as the Zarqa River, just west of biblical Mahanaim, a short distance beyond the northwest limits of Ajloun in the Ajloun Governorate in northern Jordan. However, Listib is known to have been uninhabited during the time of the Northern Kingdom of Israel.

=== Tishbe in Naphtali ===
Alternatively, Tishbe may be identical to the as-yet undiscovered "Thisbe" referenced in the Book of Tobit (Tobit 1:2), which was located west of the Jordan River in the territory of the tribe of Naphtali, "to the south of Kedesh Naphtali in Upper Galilee, above Asher toward the west, and north of Phogor".
