= Thunder and Lightning (Chi Coltrane song) =

Single by Chi Coltrane

from the album Chi Coltrane
- B-side: "Time to Come In"
- Released: August 1972
- Genre: Blue-eyed soul
- Length: 3:02
- Label: Columbia
- Songwriter: Chi Coltrane

Chi Coltrane singles chronology
"Thunder and Lightning" (1972)	"Go Like Elijah" (1973)

"Thunder and Lightning" is a 1972 song by American singer and pianist Chi Coltrane. It was the first release from her eponymous debut album, peaking at No. 17 on the US Billboard Hot 100, No. 15 on Cash Box and No. 14 on Record World. It also charted at No. 18 on the Canadian RPM magazine singles chart.

== Charts ==
Chart (1972)	Peak position
Canadian RPM Top Singles	18
US Billboard Hot 100	17
US Cash Box Top 100	15
US Record World	14
