= Go Like Elijah =

Single by Chi Coltrane

from the album Chi Coltrane
- B-side: "It's Really Come to This"
- Released: 1973
- Genre: Pop
- Label: Columbia
- Songwriter(s): Chi Coltrane

Chi Coltrane singles chronology
| "Thunder and Lightning" (1972) | "Go Like Elijah" (1973) | "You Were My Friend" (1973) |

"Go Like Elijah" is a 1973 song by Chi Coltrane. It was a number-one hit in the Netherlands at the time. It stayed in the Dutch Top 40 for one month. In the Netherlands, it was released with "It's Really Come to This" as its B-side.

The song can be found on her album Chi Coltrane (1973).

== Lyrics ==
The lyrics describe how the singer wants to rise up to Heaven after her death in the same manner as the biblical prophet Elijah who, according to a Bible passage, was lifted up in the sky by a chariot pulled by fiery horses. The song is notable for its gospel arrangement and turning the subject of death into a celebration. In an interview Coltrane explained that she did not set out to write the song as a gospel tune, but first and foremost as her true expressions about death.

== Reception ==
Record World wrote that "This very beautiful and talented lady comes up with another powerhouse vocal from her initial album. Gospel rocker that should win her many converts."

== Charts ==
| Chart (1973) | Peak position |
|---|---|
| Belgium (Ultratop 50 Flanders) | 7 |
| Belgium (Ultratop 50 Wallonia) | 8 |
| Netherlands (Single Top 100) | 1 |
