= Message (disambiguation) =

A message is an object of communication.

Message or Messages may also refer to

== Arts, entertainment, and media ==
=== Music ===
==== Groups and labels ====
- Message (band), an American hard rock band

==== Albums ====
- Message (AIDES album) (2010)
- Messages (Mongol800 album) (2001)
- Messages: Greatest Hits, a compilation album by Orchestral Manoeuvres in the Dark
- Messages (album), a 1974 album by Steve Swindells
- Message (Aya Ueto album) (2004)
- Sakura Gakuin 2010 Nendo: Message, a 2011 album by Sakura Gakuin

==== Songs ====
- "Message" (Boris song) (2008)
- "Message" (Masaharu Fukuyama song) (1995)
- "Message" (Myname song) (2011)
- "Messages" (Orchestral Manoeuvres in the Dark song) (1980)
- "Messages" (San Cisco song), a 2020 song by San Cisco
- "Message"/"Personal", a single by Aya Ueto from Message
- "Message" (Vivid song)
- "Message", a song by Sakura Gakuin from Sakura Gakuin 2010 Nendo: Message
- "Messages", a song by A Flock of Seagulls from A Flock of Seagulls
- "Messages", a song by Filthy Dukes from Nonsense in the Dark
- "Messages", a song by Velvet Revolver from Libertad

=== Other uses in arts, entertainment, and media ===
- Message, a Seventh-day Adventist periodical
- Messages (film), a 2007 British film
- The Message, a 1976 film based on the life of Islamic Prophet Muhammad

== Other uses ==
- Messages (Apple), a messaging app by Apple
- Google Messages, a messaging app by Google

== See also ==
- "Message / Call My Name", a 2013 BoA song
- Message passing
- The Message (disambiguation)
