= Tishbite =

Epithet of Elijah

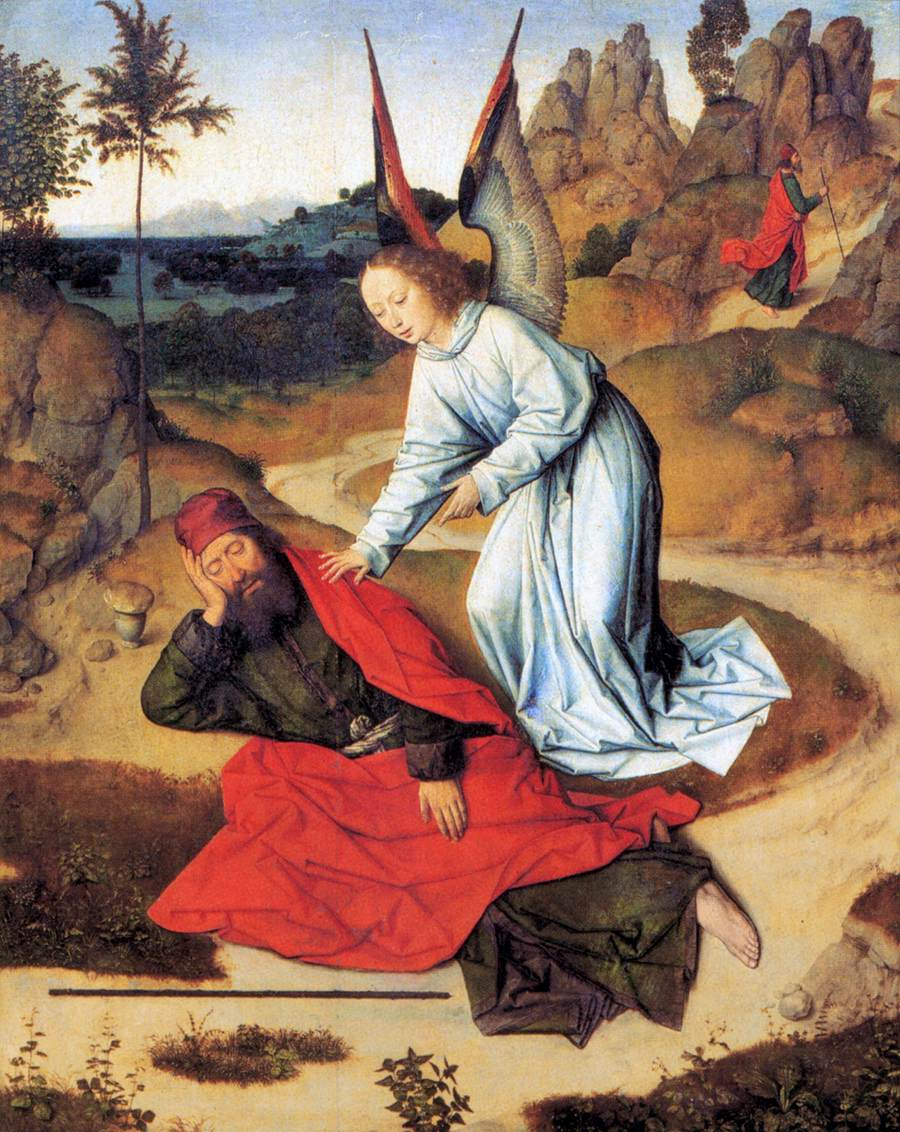
’Elijah in the Desert’ by Dieric Bouts. There are several interpretations of the Bible's reference to Elijah as "the Tishbite".

Tishbite is a demonym predicated of the Prophet Elijah in the Hebrew Bible. Scholars dispute the precise denotation of the word.

The words of 1 Kings 17:1 are usually rendered as "Elijah the Tishbite of Tishbe in Gilead". As translated into English, Tishbite is the demonym for Tishbe: the demonym is predicated of the prophet to denote that his residence or possibly his birthplace was Tishbe.

Alternatively, the words of 1 Kings 17:1 could be rendered as "Elijah the dweller from among the inhabitants in Gilead", because in that verse "Tishbite" and the word denoting inhabitants are very similar. Strong's Exhaustive Concordance of the Bible states that the word denotes a dweller, especially as distinguished from a native resident, but not an outlandish dweller, or a temporary inmate or lodger; essentially it denotes a resident alien. The Concordance indicates that the word is used to denote a sojourner nine times, a stranger three times, a foreigner once, and an inhabitant once. The most frequent use of the word is in Leviticus 25, which states sabbatical and jubilee year requirements. The denotation of sojourner is found in Leviticus 25:23, 35, 40 and 47, and the denotation of stranger in Leviticus 25:6, 45 and 47—a total of seven instances. Abraham is mentioned as a sojourner in Genesis 23:4 and King David and "our fathers" are described as "sojourners" in Psalm 39:12. These other instances of the word in question support this alternative reading for "Tishbite", such that 1 Kings 17:1 would not assert that Tishbe was the residence or birthplace of Elijah.
