= Ready to Roll (Chi Coltrane album) =

Studio album by Chi Coltrane
- Released: 1983
- Genre: Pop rock
- Length: 34:46
- Label: Teldec
- Producer: Chi Coltrane

Chi Coltrane chronology
Silk & Steel (1981)	Ready to Roll (1983)	The Message (1986)

Singles from Ready to Roll
- 1. "I'm Gonna Make You Love Me" Released: 1983

Ready to Roll is the fifth studio album by American singer Chi Coltrane, released in 1983 by German label Teldec. "I'm Gonna Make You Love Me" was the sole single to be released from the album.

== Critical reception ==
Professional ratings
Review scores
Source	Rating
AllMusic	2/5 stars

In a retrospective review for AllMusic, critic Charles Donovan described the album as a "mixed bag", concluding that "Her vocal performance is as committed and passionate as ever, and the piano playing that isn't buried in a soup of synthesizers certainly shines, but the songs fall short of expectations."

== Track listing ==
All tracks are written by Chi Coltrane.

Side one
No.	Title	Length
1.	"The Last Train"	4:03
2.	"Goin' Out Tonight"	4:20
3.	"Don't Hang Up"	3:49
4.	"Clouds, Dreams and Love"	4:54

Side two
No.	Title	Length
5.	"On My Own"	3:19
6.	"Soulstalker"	3:59
7.	"I'm Gonna Make You Love Me"	4:05
8.	"Here Comes the Rain"	2:55
9.	"I Come Back to You"	3:22
Total length:		34:46

== Personnel ==
Credits are adapted from the Ready to Roll liner notes.

- Chi Coltrane – producer
- Larry Brown – engineer
- Larry R. Craycraft – design
- George Goad – illustration; cover
- Alberto Venzago – front cover photography
- Norman Seeff – inner sleeve photography
