= The Message (Chi Coltrane album) =

Studio album by Chi Coltrane
- Released: 1986
- Studio: Sound Mill Studio LTD (England)
- Genre: Pop rock
- Length: 39:06
- Label: Teldec
- Producer: Chi Coltrane

Chi Coltrane chronology
Ready to Roll (1983)	The Message (1986)	The Comeback Concert — Live In Vienna (2012)

Singles from The Message
- 1. "I Didn't Want to Fall in Love" Released: 1986

The Message is the sixth studio album by American singer Chi Coltrane, released in 1986 by German label Teldec. "I Didn't Want to Fall in Love" was the sole single to be released from the album.

== Critical reception ==
Professional ratings
Review scores
Source	Rating
AllMusic	2.5/5 stars

In a retrospective review for AllMusic, critic Charles Donovan wrote that "The Message follows the same pattern as Ready to Roll – a grab-bag of uptempo, synth numbers, and languid ballads.", adding that "As before, nothing here wrenches the heart in the way Coltrane's first few albums did."

== Track listing ==
All tracks are written by Chi Coltrane.

Side one
No.	Title	Length
1.	"Runnin'"	4:56
2.	"Heart of Stone"	2:54
3.	"Work to Make Money"	4:52
4.	"You Don't Love Me"	4:21

Side two
No.	Title	Length
5.	"I Didn't Want to Fall in Love"	4:16
6.	"The Message"	3:21
7.	"Blinded by Love"	4:18
8.	"Angie"	4:35
9.	"Goodbye My Love"	5:33
Total length:		39:06

== Personnel ==
Credits are adapted from the liner notes of The Message.

- Chi Coltrane — lead and background vocals; keyboards; grand piano
- Laurence Cottle — bass guitar
- Stuart Elliott — drums; percussion
- Haydn Bendall — percussion
- Richard Cottle – saxophone
- Phil Smith – saxophone
- Neal Sidwell – trombone
- Steve Sidwell — trumpet
- Paul Carman – backing vocals
- Peter King – backing vocals
- Sheila Parker – backing vocals
- Sheryl Parker – backing vocals
- Carl Jones – backing vocals on "Work to Make Money"

Production and artwork

- Chi Coltrane – producer
- Haydn Bendall – engineer
- BN – mastering engineer
- Carsten Maass – design; cover
