= Chorath =

Seasonal stream mentioned in the Hebrew Bible

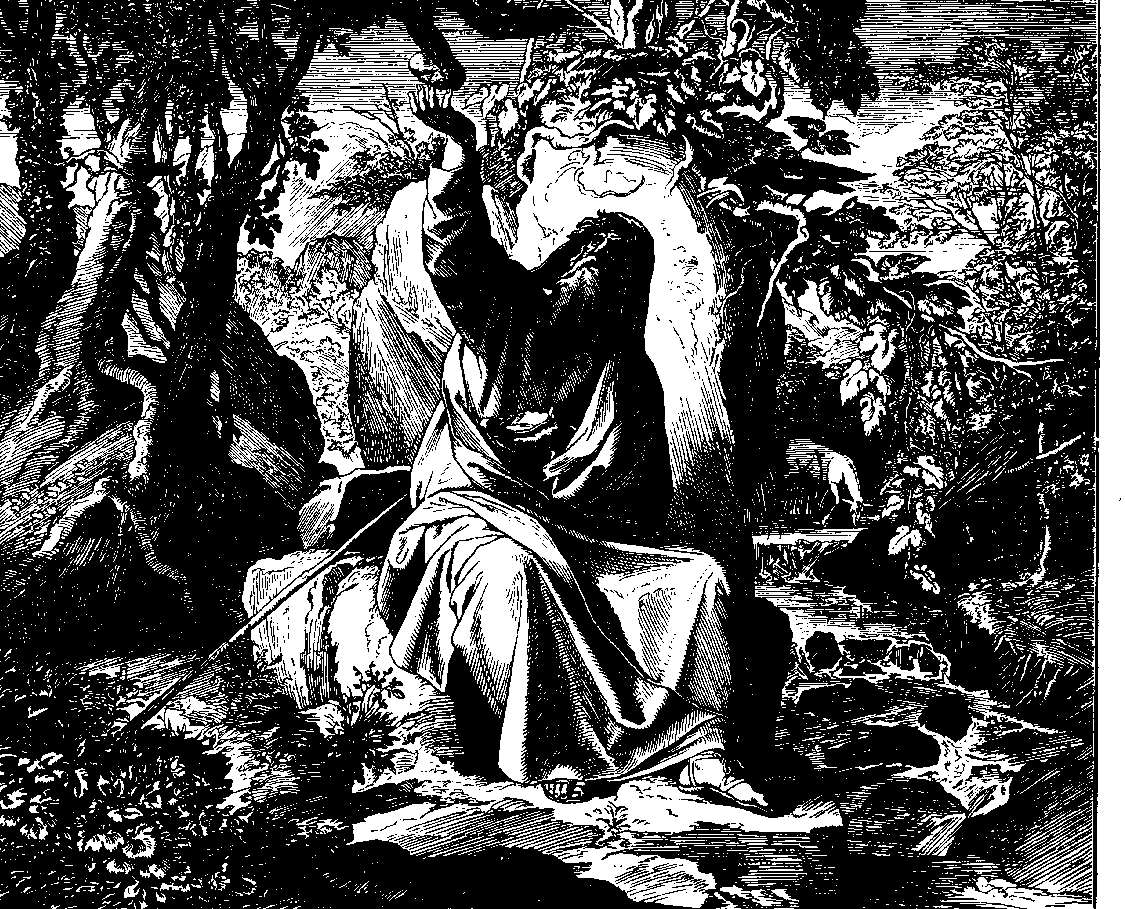
Ravens feed Elijah by the brook Cherith, from Die Bibel in Bildern

Chorath, Kerith (Hebrew: נַחַל כְּרִית, romanized: naḥal Kəriṯ), or sometimes Cherith (/ˈkɔːrɑːθ/; from the Septuagint's Greek: Χειμάῤῥους Χοῤῥάθ cheimárrhous Chorrháth), is the name of a wadi or seasonal stream mentioned in the Hebrew Bible. The prophet Elijah hid himself on the banks of the Chorath and was fed by ravens during the early part of the three years' drought which he announced to King Ahab (1 Kings 17:3).

== Etymology and toponymy ==
Cherith is a common English spelling of the Hebrew name, which comes from the Hebrew root כרת k-r-t meaning "to cut off" or "cut down". The name also signifies to engrave or carve, a cutting, separation, gorge, torrent-bed, or winter-stream.

Chorath is the name used in the 3rd-century BCE Greek translation of the Torah known as the Septuagint.

The Kerith is a naḥal in Hebrew, a wadi or seasonal stream.

== Identification ==
=== Wadi al-Yabis ===
It is usually identified with Wadi al-Yabis, a stream in western Jordan, which flows into the Jordan River at a spot opposite of Beit She'an and slightly south of it. Travellers have described it as one of the wildest ravines of the Fertile Crescent, and peculiarly fitted to afford a secure asylum to the persecuted. During the summer, the stream is very dry. Olive trees grow on its banks, and it is home to an array of wildlife including gazelle, hyrax, and egret.

According to the 1994 Peace treaty between Israel and Jordan, Israel can maintain its use of the Jordan River waters between the Yarmouk and Wadi al-Yabis.

=== Wadi Kelt ===
Some identify the stream Chorath with Wadi Qelt at the Monastery of Saint George of Choziba. If 1 Kings 17:3 is to be translated "Wadi Chorath, which is east of the Jordan", this identification would be in contradiction to the Bible, since Wadi Qelt is west of it. The King James version states Elijah should "turn eastward" (from Samaria); therefore, the brook could be anywhere east of Samaria (now Sebastia, West Bank), on either side of the River Jordan. Some translations (i.e. the Orthodox Jewish Bible: ) allow such an interpretation, by stating that Chorath is merely "near the Yarden" (Yarden being the Hebrew name of the River Jordan).

=== Wadi Fusail ===
Conder and Kitchener noted, while writing of Qaryut, that "[t]his place, being at the head of Wady Fusail, seems to have given rise to the mediaeval identification of that valley as the Brook Cherith (mentioned by Marino Sanuto in 1321)." Sanuto commented that the stream extended into Phasaelis, which was named after Prince Phasael, the brother of King Herod. This identification would again contradict the more common translation of 1 Kings 17:3 (see comment above at "Wadi Kelt"), since Wadi Fusail with both modern Qaryut and ancient Phasaelis lie west, not east of the Jordan.

== Other uses of the name ==
The name is also a Mizrahi Jewish surname, specifically among Yemenite Jews. They descend from the Banu al-Harith, which is of Qahtanite origin and was once one of the most important tribes of the city of Najran.

Irish novelist, short-story writer, poet, art critic, memoirist, and dramatist George Moore (1852–1933) wrote The Brook Kerith: A Syrian Story, which was published in 1916. It is a retelling of the New Testament account of Jesus's life.
