= Ready to Rock (disambiguation) =

Ready To Rock may refer to:

- Ready to Rock
- "Ready to Rock", a song by Airbourne from Black Dog Barking
- "Ready to Rock", a song by Band-Maid from Scooooop
- "Ready to Rock", a song by Krokus from The Blitz
- "Ready to Rock", a song by Michael Schenker Group from MSG
