= Ready to Run =

Ready to Run may refer to:

- Ready to Run (film), 2000 Disney Channel television film
- Ready to Run (album), 2003 debut and only album by Fame Academy contestant Sinéad Quinn and title song "Ready to Run" from the same album
- "Ready to Run" (song), a 1999 song by Dixie Chicks
- "Ready to Run", a song by One Direction from the album Four
- "Ready to Run", a 2019 song by Adam Lambert from his EP Velvet: Side A
