= Chi Coltrane =

American singer (born 1948)

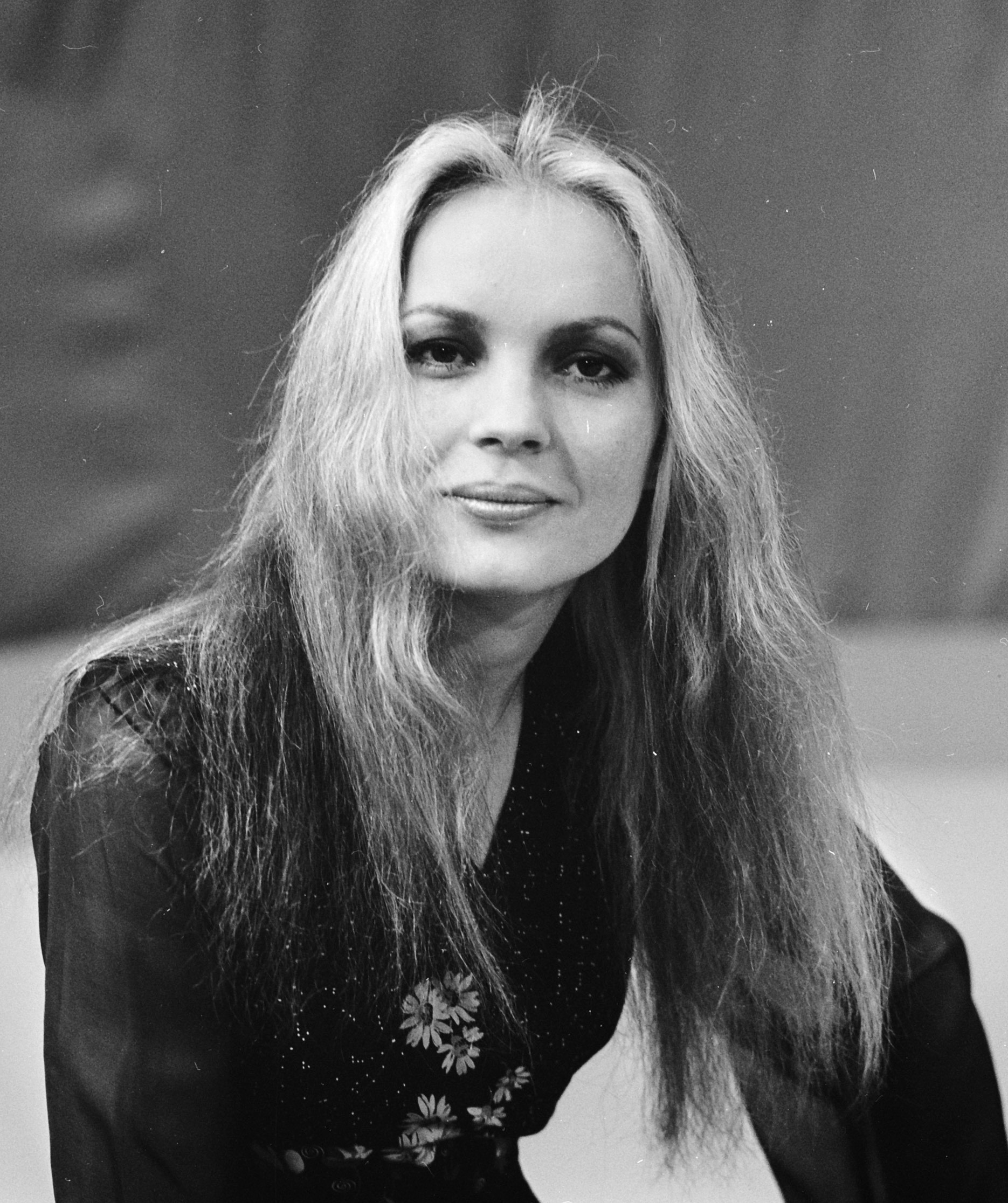
- Coltrane on TopPop in 1974

Background information
- Born: November 6, 1948 (age 78)
- Genres: Rock; gospel
- Occupations: Songwriter; pianist; singer
- Instruments: Vocals; piano
- Years active: 1972–present
- Labels: Columbia; CBS; Clouds; Teldec; Trane Music
- Website: chicoltrane.com

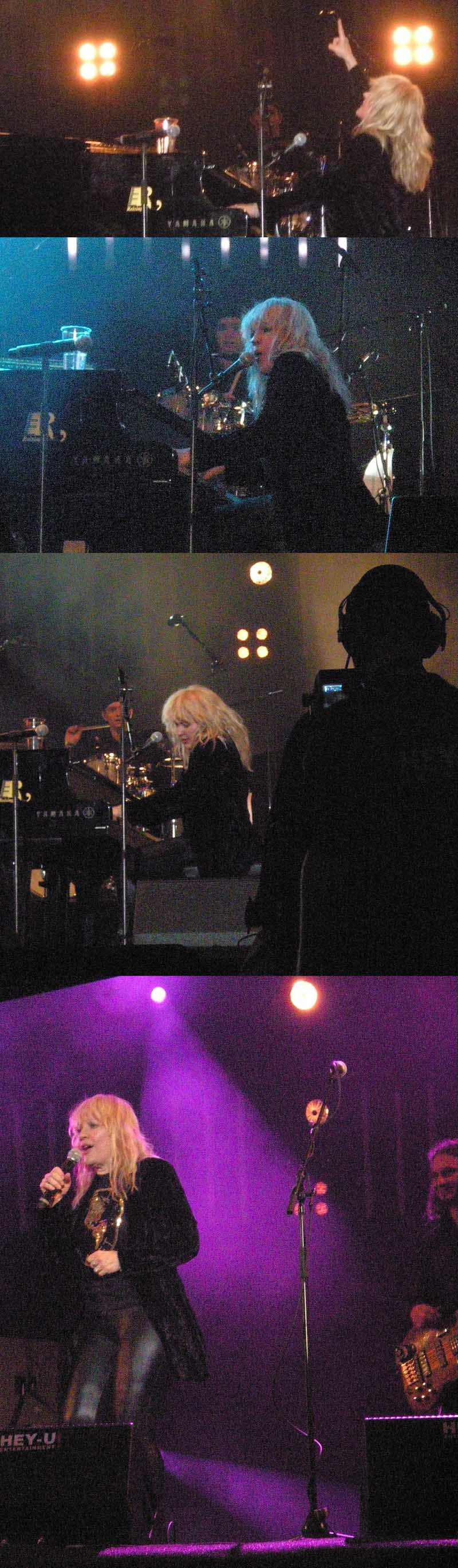
Coltrane in 2009

Chi Coltrane (born November 16, 1948) is an American rock/gospel singer, songwriter, and pianist.

She first came to notice in 1972 with the single "Thunder and Lightning". Her 1973 song "Go Like Elijah" was a number one-hit in The Netherlands.

== Career ==
Chi Coltrane began as a performer in Chicago. She made her overseas debut when she represented the U.S. at the International Rock Festival for 50,000 people in Rio de Janeiro. She returned to the U.S. where Clive Davis signed her to Columbia Records. Her only hit in the U.S. was "Thunder and Lightning", which reached #17 nationwide. Coltrane had two top 40 hits in Germany, hitting #1 in the Netherlands and holding that position for a month with the original "Go Like Elijah."

Coltrane made many guest appearances on American Network TV programs, including NBC's The Tonight Show and Episode 76 of NBC's Midnight Special on July 12, 1974. Coltrane appeared with The Who, The Eagles, Stevie Wonder, and Rod Stewart. During the 1970s and 1980s in America, Chi was once dubbed "The First Lady of Rock"; and held the #1 position in the "Music Express Popularity" poll. Chi's lifetime work has garnered many awards and accolades, both in America and abroad, including the European Gold Hammer and Silver Hammer for top Female artist. In 1999 Chi was honored in Los Angeles.

Coltrane was listed in the European "100 Best Musicians of the CENTURY" list. Rolling Stone described Coltrane as a "rip-snorting female vocalist/composer/producer whose performances are nothing less than searing." Paul Buckmaster, referring to her new song "Yesterday, Today & Forever" said; "I had to stop a few times while working on the string arrangement of 'Yesterday, Today & Forever' because of the profound emotions it stirred up in me - it is that great of a song. I think this may be the most beautiful song I have ever heard."

== Discography ==
=== Studio albums ===
- Chi Coltrane (Columbia, 1972) (No. 148 on the Billboard Top LPs).
- Let It Ride (Columbia, 1973)
- Road to Tomorrow (Clouds, 1977)
- Silk & Steel (CBS, 1981)
- Live! (Teldec, 1982)
- Ready to Roll (Teldec, 1983)
- The Message (Teldec, 1986)
- The Comeback Concert - Live in Vienna (Trane Music, 2012)
