= Get the Message =

Get the Message may refer to:

- Get the Message (game show), a 1964 American TV game show
- "Get the Message" (The Loud House), a segment from a 2016 television episode
- Get the Message (film), a 1972 Disney educational animated short
- "Get the Message" (song), a 1991 song by Electronic
- Get the Message – The Best of Electronic, a 2006 compilation album by Electronic
- "Get the Message", a 2009 song by 50 Cent from War Angel LP
- Get the Message, a 1987 play by Clive King
