= Testament: The Bible in Animation =

- Also known as: Testament: Y Beibl Wedi'i Animeiddio (Wales); Testament: The Bible in Animation (UK and US)
- Genre: Drama
- Created by: Naomi Jones
- Developed by: Derek W. Hayes
- Written by: Richard Everitt
- Creative director: Martin Lamb
- Country of origin: United Kingdom
- Original languages: English; Welsh
- No. of seasons: 1
- No. of episodes: 9

Production
- Executive producer: Naomi Jones
- Producer: Gary Hurst
- Production companies: Christmas Films; S4C; Right Angle

Original release
- Network: BBC2 (UK); S4C (Wales); HBO (US)
- Release: 11 October – 6 December 1996

Testament: The Bible in Animation is a 1996 British animated series that was produced by and shown on Sianel 4 Cymru (S4C). It was also shown on the BBC. It featured animated versions of stories from the Bible, each story using its own unique style of animation, including stop-motion animation. It ran for one series of nine episodes in the United Kingdom and won one Emmy, with three nominations, in the United States. It includes the song "Adiemus" by Welsh composer Karl Jenkins as its intro.

The show was produced by Christmas Films and S4C, who also created the 1992–1994 series Shakespeare: The Animated Tales and the 2000 film The Miracle Maker, sharing many of the same voice talents and styles of animation.

== Series overview ==
Series	Episodes	Originally released	
Series	Episodes	First released	Last released
1	9	11 October 1996 (S4C version); 16 October 1996 (BBC Wales version)	6 December 1996 (S4C version); 11 December 1996 (BBC Wales version)

== Episodes ==
No.	Title	Animation type	Based on	Original release date
1	"Creation and the Flood"	Cel animation and Paint on glass	Genesis	11 October 1996 (S4C version); 16 October 1996 (BBC Wales version)
As his ark crosses the drowned Earth, Noah tells his family the story of Adam and Eve, the fall of Lucifer, and the banishment from Eden.
2	"Abraham"	Stop motion	Genesis	18 October 1996 (S4C version); 23 October 1996 (BBC Wales version)
When God told Abraham that he and his wife Sarah would have a son, Abraham was astounded, for Sarah was long past child bearing age, but God assigned to Abraham the honour of being the "Father of Many Nations." Overjoyed at the birth of his son Isaac, Abraham was horrified by the next command from God, to offer his son as a sacrifice to Him.
3	"Joseph"	Stop motion	Genesis	25 October 1996 (S4C version); 30 October 1996 (BBC Wales version)
Sold into slavery by his jealous brothers, Joseph uses his skills to interpret dreams and becomes seated at the right hand of the Pharaoh himself.
4	"Moses"	Cel animation	Exodus	1 November 1996 (S4C version); 6 November 1996 (BBC Wales version)
Fleeing after murdering an Egyptian overseer, the Hebrew Moses settles in the land of Midian. But one day he is visited by God who instructs him to return to Egypt and, with the help of his brother Aaron and ten devastating plagues, free the Israelites from the iron grip of the pharaoh Merneptah.
5	"Ruth"	Stop motion	Ruth	8 November 1996 (S4C version); 13 November 1996 (BBC Wales version)
This is the story of a woman whose name has becomes synonymous with love and fidelity. In a moving tale, Ruth follows her mother-in-law Naomi back to Naomi's native Bethlehem after the sad death of both women's husbands. Working hard in the fields to feed herself and Naomi, Ruth finds her feeling for her kinsman Boaz run deeper than gratitude for his help with the work. Prepared to marry for Naomi's sake, Ruth's loyalty touches Boaz and he decides to challenge the claim of a closer relative for Ruth's hand.
6	"David and Saul"	Cel animation	1 Samuel	15 November 1996 (S4C version); 20 November 1996 (BBC Wales version)
Tormented by demons, King Saul sends for a musician, David to calm his mind, little knowing the young man will one day be his greatest general - and his greatest enemy.
7	"Elijah"	Cel animation	1 Kings	22 November 1996 (S4C version); 27 November 1996 (BBC Wales version)
Elijah, the one prophet of The Lord God, sets out to save Israel from the corrupt King Ahab and his evil Queen Jezebel. The music used is that of the Mendelssohn's oratorio Elijah, with Welsh Baritone Bryn Terfel as soloist in the part of the Prophet Elijah.
8	"Daniel"	Oil painting	Daniel	29 November 1996 (S4C version); 4 December 1996 (BBC Wales version)
Political intrigue and unwavering faith are the cornerstones of the story of Daniel, held captive for many years under the Babylonian Kings. Much loved and respected by the conqueror, King Darius, who appointed him governor, Daniel provoked great jealousy among the court advisers. Divine love and human resolver enter the lions' den together, emerging victorious.
9	"Jonah"	For animation	Jonah	6 December 1996 (S4C version); 11 December 1996 (BBC Wales version)
The prophet Jonah rejects God's call to go to Nineveh, but divine intervention, and a great fish brings him to the evil city which he warns will be destroyed in forty days.

== Voice cast ==
- Joss Ackland − Noah, Samuel
- John Alderton − Jonah
- Roger Allam - Chief Magus
- Adjoa Andoh − Ruth
- Oona Beeson − Ishmael
- Deborah Berlin − Isaac
- Patrick Brennan − Narrator, Lot, Japhet
- David Burke − God
- Simon Callow − Merneptah
- Anna Carteret − Miriam
- Terry Dauncey − Shaphat
- Alan Dobie − Saul
- Philip Franks − Daniel
- Hannah Gordon − Narrator
- Emma Gregory − Atarah
- Christopher Guard − Jonathan
- Helen Gwyn − Hagar
- Robert Hardy − Abraham
- Robert Harper − Young Joseph
- Simon Harris − Adam, Shem
- Ciarán Hinds − Satan (Lucifer)
- Steve Hodson − Nebuchadnezzar
- David Holt − Michael, Captain
- Kelly Hunter − Eve
- Gerald James − Jacob
- Martin Jarvis − Moses
- Siriol Jenkins − Orpah
- Iestyn Jones − Elisha
- Hakeem Kae-Kazim − Ham
- Polly Kemp − Michal
- Rob Lane − Reuben
- Jane Lapotaire − Sarah
- Tony Leader − Aaron, Rameses, Eliab
- Anton Lesser − Joseph
- Simon Ludders − Simeon
- Doreen Mantle − Naomi
- John McAndrew − Benjamin
- Colin McFarlane − God, Goliath
- Paul McGann − David
- T. P. McKenna − God
- Ian McNeice − Ahab
- Clive Merrison − Darius
- Bill Nighy − Belshazzar
- Richard O'Callaghan − Judah
- Carolyn Pickles − Narrator
- Christine Pritchard − Witch of Endor
- Sue Roderick − Naamah
- Ivor Roberts − Jethro
- Clive Russell − Boaz
- David Schofield − Elijah
- Bryn Terfel - Elijah (vocal soloist)
- Mark Straker − Angel
- Jonathan Tafler − Levi, Pharaoh
- Stephen Thorne − King of Nineveh, Governor
- Philip Voss − Potiphar
- Victoria Wicks − Jezebel

== Broadcast UK history ==
- BBC2 (16 October 1996 – 11 December 1996, 6 January 1997 – 13 May 1997; repeated from 1998-2006 as part of BBC2's BBC Schools daytime strand also repeated occasionally as part of the BBC Learning Zone in 2001, 2003, 2004 and 2006)
- S4C (11 October 1996 – 6 December 1996; in Welsh, as Testament: Y Beibl Wedi'i Animeiddio)

== See also ==
- List of Welsh television series
