= Raising of the son of the widow of Nain =

Miracle carried out by Jesus according to the Bible

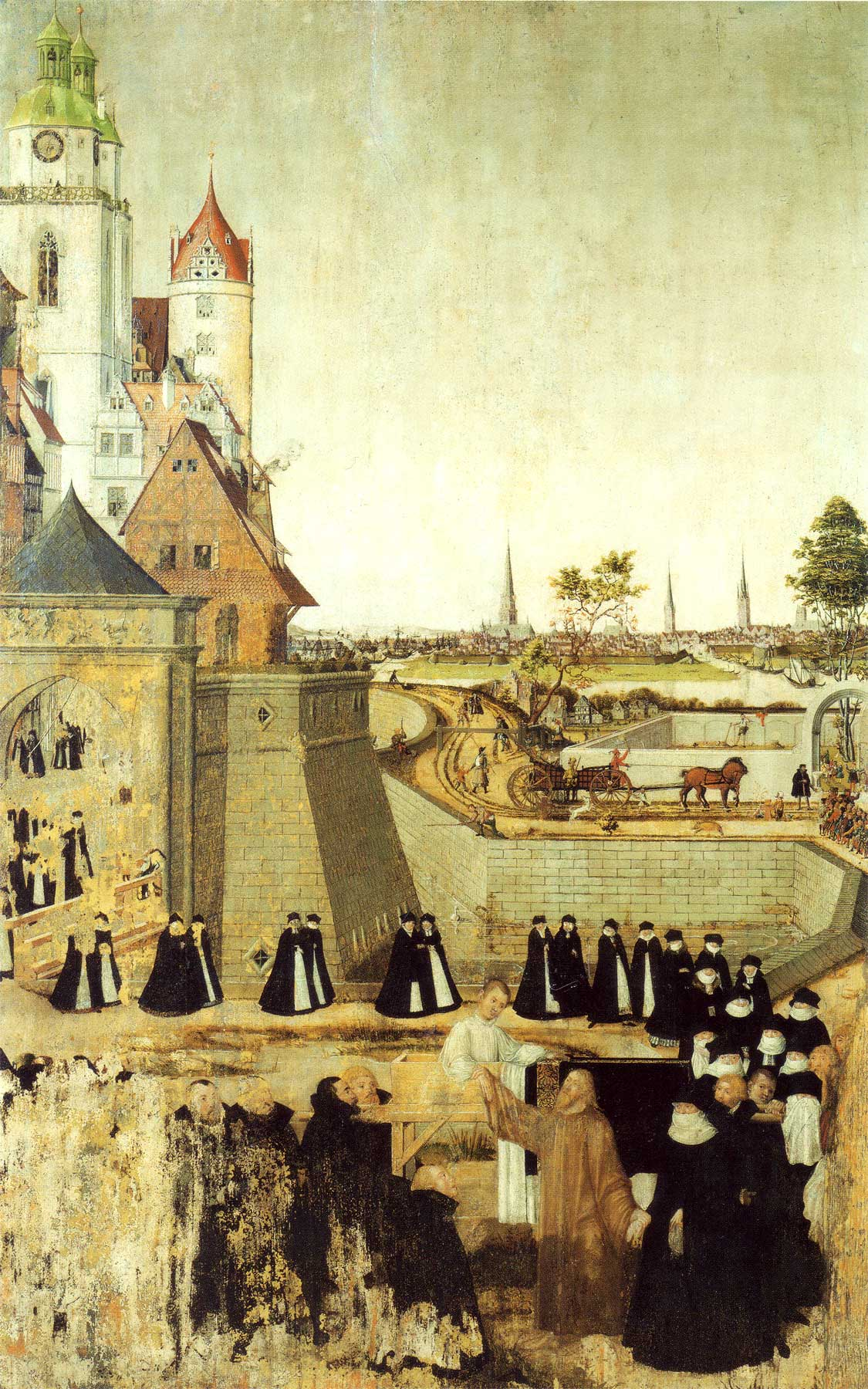
Resurrection of the Widow's son from Nain, altar panel by Lucas Cranach the Younger, c. 1569, in the Stadtkirche Wittenberg

The raising of the son of the widow of Nain (or Naim) is an account of a miracle by Jesus, recorded in the Gospel of Luke chapter 7. Jesus arrived at the village of Nain during the burial ceremony of the son of a widow, and raised the young man from the dead. (Luke 7:11–17)

The location is the village of Nain, two miles (3.2 km) south of Mount Tabor. This is the first of three miracles of Jesus in the canonical gospels in which he raises the dead, the other two being the raising of Jairus' daughter and of Lazarus.

== Biblical account ==
The miracle is described thus in Luke 7:

11 Soon afterwards Jesus went to a town named Nain, accompanied by His disciples and a large crowd. 12 And when He arrived at the gate of the town, a funeral procession was coming out. A young man had died, the only son of his mother, and she was a widow. And a large crowd from the town was with her. 13 And when the Lord saw her, His heart was filled with pity for her, and He said to her, "Do not weep". 14 Then He walked over and touched the coffin, while the pallbearers stood still. Jesus said to the dead man, "Young man, I say to thee, arise!" And he who was dead, sat up and began to talk, and Jesus gave him back to his mother.

16 Then they all were filled with awe and praised God. And they said, "A great prophet has risen among us", and "God has visited His people".

17 This news about Jesus went out through all the country and the surrounding territory.

— Good News Translation

== Interpretation ==
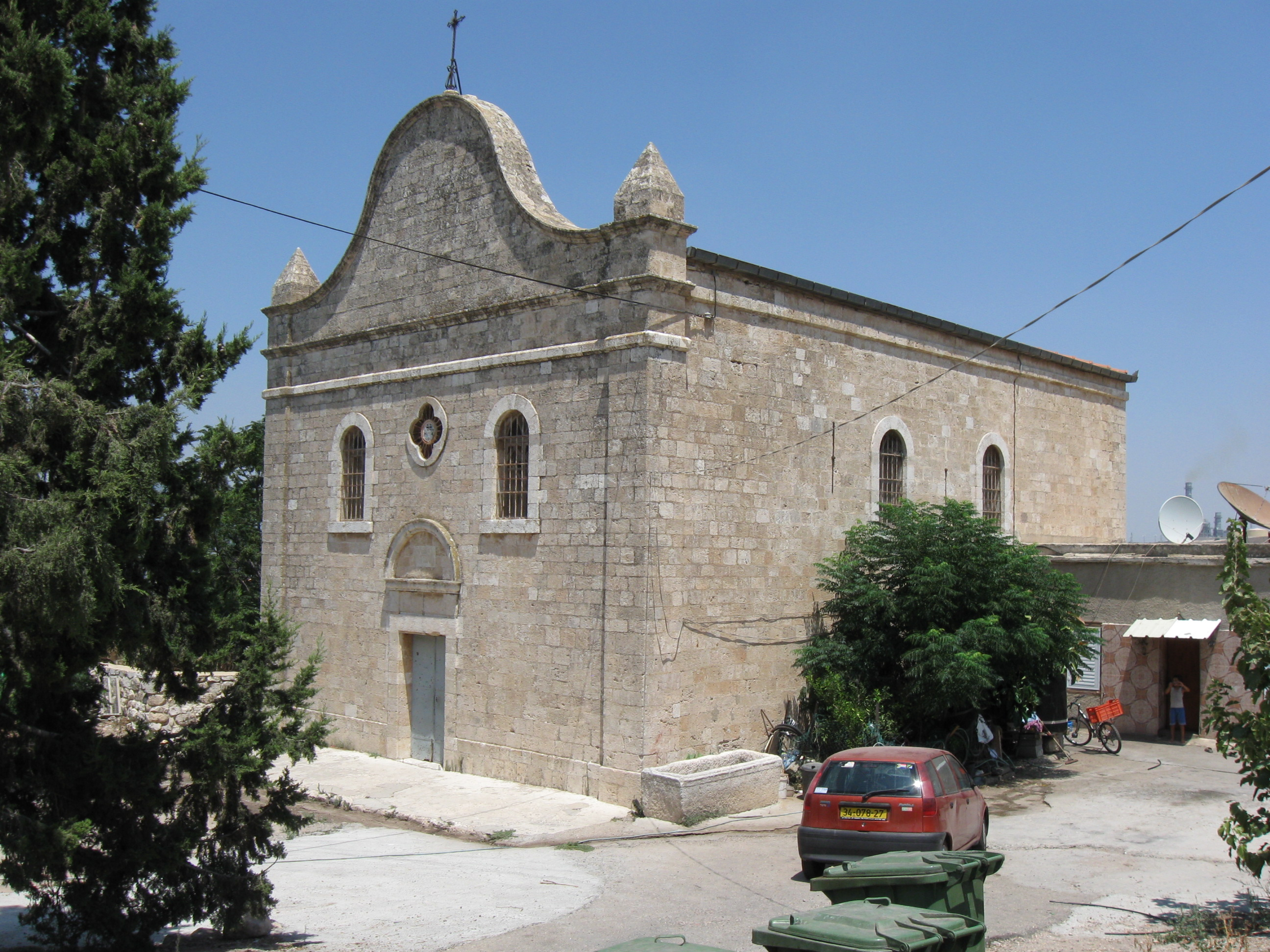
Widow's Son Church at Nain, which is the site of the miracle

The raising of the son of the widow of Zarephath, by the Old Testament prophet Elijah (1 Kings 17), is seen by Fred Craddock as the model for this miracle, as there are several parallels in the details, especially some verbal parallels. The raising of the son of the woman of Shunem (2 Kings 4) by Elisha is also similar, including the reaction of the people. In particular, the location of Nain is very close to Shunem, identified with modern Sulam. Sinclair Ferguson calls attention to this as an example of a repeated pattern in the history of redemption. He concludes that the pattern repetition:

"comes to its fullness in the person of Jesus Christ, the great prophet who heals not merely through delegated authority from God, but on his own authority, without rituals or prayers, but with a simple word of power. Here is the great God and Saviour of Israel in the flesh"...

The woman in the story had lost both her husband and her only son, so that there was no one left to support her. As she could not have inherited the land, the loss of her only son would have left her dependent on the charity of more distant relatives and neighbours.

Both this account and the preceding one of the healing of the Centurion's servant (Luke 7:1–10) serve as a precursor to Jesus' assurance to the imprisoned John the Baptist that He is truly, 'the one who is to come' (7:19), since, 'the dead are raised.' (7:22).

== See also ==
- Ministry of Jesus
- Miracles of Jesus
- New Testament places associated with Jesus
- Parables of Jesus
- Church of the Resurrection of the Widow's Son

Raising of the son of the widow of Nain Life of Jesus: Miracles
Preceded by Parable of the Two Builders in the Sermon on the Mount	New Testament; Events	Succeeded by Parable of the Two Debtors; Parables of Jesus
