= Atara =

Atara may refer to:

- 'Atara, Palestinian village
- Atara, Abkhazia, a village in Ochamchira District, Abkhazia
- Atarah, Hebrew name meaning "crown"
- Atara, a former genus of gossamer-winged butterfly, nowadays included in the genus Rapala (butterfly)
- Atara Barzilay, Miss Israel 1957
