= 1 Kings 18 =

1 Kings, chapter 18

- ← chapter 17 chapter 19 →
- The pages containing the Books of Kings (1 & 2 Kings) Leningrad Codex (1008 CE).
- Book: First book of Kings
- Hebrew Bible part: Nevi'im
- Order in the Hebrew part: 4
- Category: Former Prophets
- Christian Bible part: Old Testament
- Order in the Christian part: 11

1 Kings 18 is the eighteenth chapter of the Books of Kings in the Hebrew Bible or the First Book of Kings in the Old Testament of the Christian Bible. The book is a compilation of various annals recording the acts of the kings of Israel and Judah by a Deuteronomic compiler in the seventh century BCE, with a supplement added in the sixth century BCE. This chapter belongs to the section comprising 1 Kings 16:15 to 2 Kings 8:29 which documents the period of Omri's dynasty. The focus of this chapter is the activity of prophet Elijah during the reign of king Ahab in the northern kingdom.

== Text ==
This chapter was originally written in the Hebrew language and since the 16th century is divided into 46 verses.

=== Textual witnesses ===
Some early manuscripts containing the text of this chapter in Hebrew are of the Masoretic Text tradition, which includes the Codex Cairensis (895), Aleppo Codex (10th century), and Codex Leningradensis (1008).

There is also a translation into Koine Greek known as the Septuagint, made in the last few centuries BCE. Extant ancient manuscripts of the Septuagint version include Codex Vaticanus (B; $\mathfrak{G}$^{B}; 4th century) and Codex Alexandrinus (A; $\mathfrak{G}$^{A}; 5th century). (Note: The whole book of 1 Kings is missing from the extant Codex Sinaiticus.)

== Elijah and Obadiah (18:1–16) ==
The main theme of the narrative is drought and rain. As the land of Israel including the king suffered under the drought, YHWH sent for Elijah to bring about the crisis and then the solution to the conflict between the worship of two deities. Before Elijah faced Ahab, one (God-fearing) minister, named Obadiah (meaning: 'servant of Yahweh') became an intermediate. Obadiah was also the one helping to hide Yahweh's servants during a purge of prophets by queen Jezebel (apparently the reason of Elijah's journey to the river of Kerith into the foreign territory of Phoenicia in Zarephath), so when Elijah unexpectedly standing before him, Obadiah fell to the ground in fear and respect. Similar miraculous transport of God's prophets is noted in Ezekiel 3:14, 11:1, cf. 2 Kings 2:11.

=== Verse 1 ===
After many days the word of the Lord came to Elijah, in the third year, saying, “Go, show yourself to Ahab, and I will send rain upon the earth.”

- "The third year": The Jewish tradition preserved in the New Testament (Luke 4:25; James 5:17) reckons this not from the beginning of the drought (which is said to have lasted for three years and six months), but to be the third year after the restoration of the widow's son in Zarephath.

== Elijah and the competition between the deities on Mount Carmel (18:17–40) ==
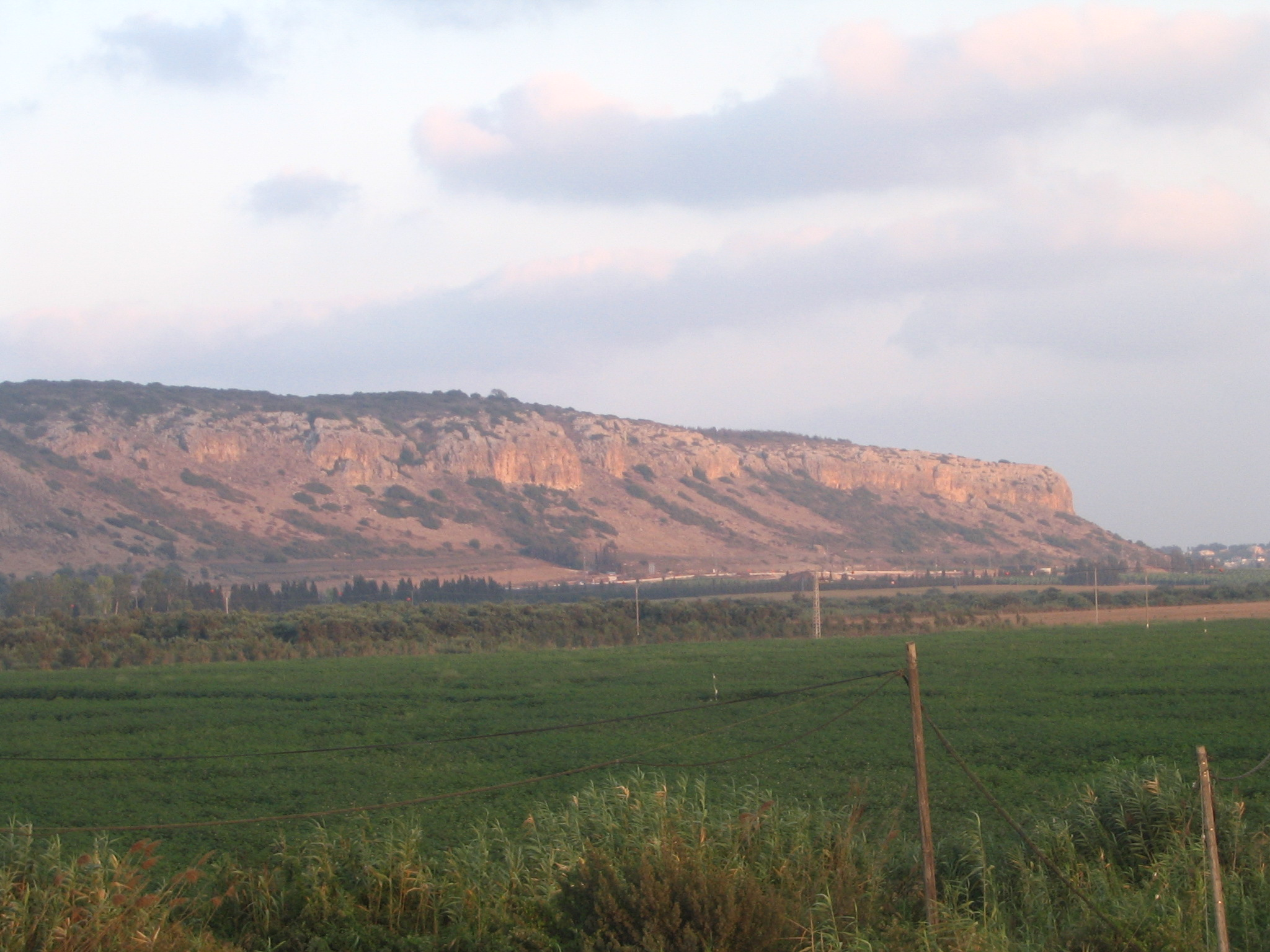
Mount Carmel at sunset, as seen from the entrance of Kibbutz Ma'agan Michael.

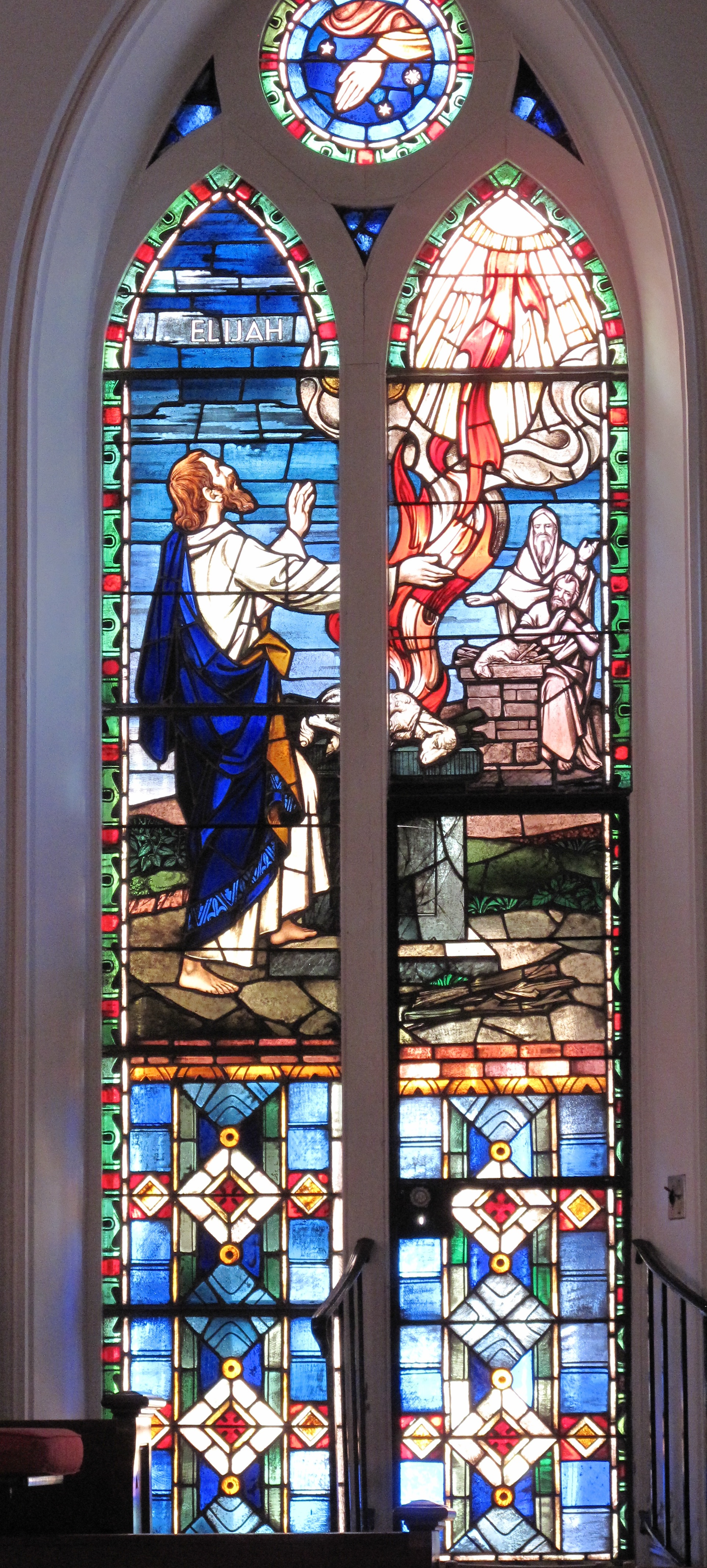
Elijah's offering is consumed by fire from heaven in a stained glass window at St. Matthew's German Evangelical Lutheran Church in Charleston, South Carolina.

As soon as Ahab met Elijah, he tried to hold the prophet responsible for the calamity befallen Israel, calling Elijah 'the troubler of Israel' (verse 17; cf. Joshua 6:18; 7:25 concerning Achan, whose sin brought God's judgment on Israel) . Elijah immediately threw the accusation back at Ahab for the apostasy sin of him and his father's house forsaking Yahweh and following the Baals. In Joshua 7, the identity of the true 'troubler of Israel' was revealed in public before "all Israel", so in this case, Elijah wanted "all Israel" to gather on Mount Carmel, a place near to the Phoenician border, to resolve the matter. The people of Israel at this point seemed not to hold YHWH monotheism anymore as they didn't react to the choice Elijah offering at all: 'YHWH or Baal' alone, but they agreed to witness the competition (while the prophets of Baal didn't reply to the challenge). A miracle must bring truth to light, and it was quickly revealed that the Baals are incapable of doing this, even after their priests performing the whole cultic and ritual activities of Baalistic religion (as reliably reported in this narrative: the 'prayer, rhythmic movements, and self-mortification building up to ecstasy', verses 26–29). This violent cultic frenzy of Baalistic activities with 'swords and lances' (=spears) was attested by an Egyptian traveller "Wen-Amon" or "Wenamun", who around 1100 BCE witnessed it in Byblos, a Phoenician coastal city north of Jezebel's hometown of Sidon. By contrast, YHWH-religion only requires the spoken word (prayer) to immediately produce miracles. The people who saw the demonstration of divine power quickly turned to YHWH's side with a call of faith, 'The LORD indeed is God', which unmistakably recalls Elijah's name ('my God is YHWH'), so the personal conviction of Elijah then became that of the people of Israel.

=== Verse 19 ===
[Elijah answered] "Now therefore send and gather all Israel to me at Mount Carmel, and the 450 prophets of Baal and the 400 prophets of Asherah, who eat at Jezebel's table."

- "Mount Carmel": also known in Arabic as "Mount Mar Elias" (Arabic: جبل مار إلياس, Jabal Mar Ilyas, lit. "Mount Saint Elias/Elijah"), a coastal mountain range in northern Israel stretching from the Mediterranean Sea towards the southeast, about 35 kilometres (22 mi) northwest of Jezreel.

=== Verse 31 ===
And Elijah took twelve stones, according to the number of the tribes of the sons of Jacob, to whom the word of the Lord had come, saying, "Israel shall be your name."

- "Twelve stones": reminding the people of their true identity as the special people of the Lord (cf. Genesis 35:10).

== Elijah brings rain (18:41–46) ==
The triumph of Elijah on Mount Carmel seems to make king Ahab even listen to Elijah's word, that the king should eat and drink while expecting the rain to come soon. The return of the rains is another triumph for Elijah, who called for rain seven times (verses 42–44) and as the rain started to pour, Elijah had the 'hand of the LORD' grasping him so he could run ahead of the royal chariots for more than 20 kilometres (12 mi) from Carmel to Jezreel. Thus, the opening conflict of 16:32–33 and 17:1 is resolved by proving YHWH to be the only effective God.

=== Verse 46 ===
And the hand of the Lord was on Elijah; and he girded up his loins, and ran before Ahab to the entrance of Jezreel.

- "Girded up his loins": or "Tucked the skirts of his robe in his belt in preparation for quick travel"
- "To the entrance of Jezreel": Jezreel is located in the valley southeast of Mount Carmel; a place where Ahab and Jezebel had a palace (1 Kings 21:1). Elijah went there presumably because he thought that the war was over.

== See also ==
- Abraham
- Asherah
- Baal
- Idolatry
- Isaac
- Israel
- Jezreel
- Kishon
- Prophet
- Samaria
- Twelve Tribes of Israel
- Related Bible parts: Genesis 35, 1 Kings 16, 1 Kings 17, 2 Chronicles 17, Luke 4, James 5

== Sources ==
- Collins, John J. (2014). "Chapter 14: 1 Kings 12 – 2 Kings 25". Introduction to the Hebrew Scriptures. Fortress Press. pp. 277–296. ISBN 978-1451469233.
- Coogan, Michael David (2007). Coogan, Michael David; Brettler, Marc Zvi; Newsom, Carol Ann; Perkins, Pheme (eds.). The New Oxford Annotated Bible with the Apocryphal/Deuterocanonical Books: New Revised Standard Version, Issue 48 (Augmented 3rd ed.). Oxford University Press. ISBN 978-0195288810.
- Dietrich, Walter (2007). "13. 1 and 2 Kings". In Barton, John; Muddiman, John (eds.). The Oxford Bible Commentary (first (paperback) ed.). Oxford University Press. pp. 232–266. ISBN 978-0199277186.
- Halley, Henry H. (1965). Halley's Bible Handbook: an abbreviated Bible commentary (24th (revised) ed.). Zondervan Publishing House. ISBN 0-310-25720-4.
- Hayes, Christine (2015). Introduction to the Bible. Yale University Press. ISBN 978-0300188271.
- Leithart, Peter J. (2006). 1 & 2 Kings. Brazos Theological Commentary on the Bible. Brazos Press. ISBN 978-1587431258.
- McKane, William (1993). "Kings, Book of". In Metzger, Bruce M; Coogan, Michael D (eds.). The Oxford Companion to the Bible. Oxford University Press. pp. 409–413. ISBN 978-0195046458.
- Metzger, Bruce M; Coogan, Michael D, eds. (1993). The Oxford Companion to the Bible. Oxford University Press. ISBN 978-0195046458.
- Würthwein, Ernst (1995). The Text of the Old Testament. Translated by Rhodes, Erroll F. Grand Rapids, MI: Wm. B. Eerdmans. ISBN 0-8028-0788-7.
