= 1 Kings 19 =

1 Kings, chapter 19

- ← chapter 18 chapter 20 →
- The pages containing the Books of Kings (1 & 2 Kings) Leningrad Codex (1008 CE).
- Book: First book of Kings
- Hebrew Bible part: Nevi'im
- Order in the Hebrew part: 4
- Category: Former Prophets
- Christian Bible part: Old Testament
- Order in the Christian part: 11

1 Kings 19 is the nineteenth chapter of the Books of Kings in the Hebrew Bible or the First Book of Kings in the Old Testament of the Christian Bible. The book is a compilation of various annals recording the acts of the kings of Israel and Judah by a Deuteronomic compiler in the seventh century BCE, with a supplement added in the sixth century BCE. This chapter belongs to the section comprising 1 Kings 16:15 to 2 Kings 8:29 which documents the period of the Omrides. The focus of this chapter is the activity of prophet Elijah during the reign of king Ahab in the northern kingdom.

== Text ==
This chapter was originally written in the Hebrew language and since the 16th century is divided into 21 verses.

=== Textual witnesses ===
Some early manuscripts containing the text of this chapter in Hebrew are of the Masoretic Text tradition, which includes the Codex Cairensis (895), Aleppo Codex (10th century), and Codex Leningradensis (1008).

There is also a translation into Koine Greek known as the Septuagint, made in the last few centuries BCE. Extant ancient manuscripts of the Septuagint version include Codex Vaticanus (B; $\mathfrak{G}$^{B}; 4th century) and Codex Alexandrinus (A; $\mathfrak{G}$^{A}; 5th century). (Note: The whole book of 1 Kings is missing from the extant Codex Sinaiticus.)

== Elijah's flight to Horeb (19:1–8) ==
The strife for the exclusive worship of Yahweh and against Baalism in Israel took longer time and less straightforward than expected from 1 Kings 18—a fact reflected in Elijah's sudden flight to Horeb, the name used in the Book of Deuteronomy and Chronicles for Mount Sinai, where the Israelites received the Ten Commandments. The dispirited Elijah miraculously received food and water as well as encouragement twice before reaching the mountain of God (cf. 1 Kings 18:46).

=== Verse 3 ===
And when he saw that, he arose and ran for his life, and went to Beersheba, which belongs to Judah, and left his servant there.

- "And when he saw that": from Hebrew: וַיַּ֗רְא wa-yar; The Greek Septuagint (LXX) follows the reading וַיִרָא and renders it as καὶ ἐφοβήθη, "and he was afraid", which makes sense but unnecessary, because Elijah clearly understood the threat for his life when he "saw" the message from Jezebel.
- Beersheba: a frontier town far to the south of Jerusalem which was little mentioned after the patriarchal time (Genesis 21:14; Genesis 21:33; Genesis 22:19; Genesis 28:10; Genesis 46:1, etc.). The note that "it belonged to Judah" was significant because the kingdom of Judah under Jehoshaphat was in an alliance with the kingdom of Israel, so Elijah might not be safe there, although his servant (traditionally believed to be the son of the widow of Zarephath) might stay safely there.

== Elijah's meeting with God on Horeb (19:9–18) ==
Patterning after Moses who met God on Mount Horeb (Exodus 24; 33) Elijah hoped to have a similar meeting. However, instead of encountering God in impressive natural phenomena (which would have been connected with the weather god Baal) nor in violent power (such as in 1 Kings 18:40), Elijah met a completely different God whose approach was 'extremely powerful and quietly beautiful', a clear contrast to that of 1 Kings 18 and especially 2 Kings 10. The prophet was twice asked the reason for his presence, and twice he replied with the same frustration, as if God had not appeared to him in the meantime. God spoke of the 7,000 Israelites who did not kneel before Baal to redress the balance of Elijah's complaint about his apparent solitude. During that meeting Elijah was charged to enlist three warriors for Yahweh's cause, two of whom would 'draw a line of blood through history': Hazael of Aram and Jehu of Israel. The third one is the prophet Elisha who would actually anoint the other two to carry out Elijah's mission after Elijah was taken up to heaven (cf. 2 Kings 8:7–15; 9:1–10).

=== Verses 11–12 ===
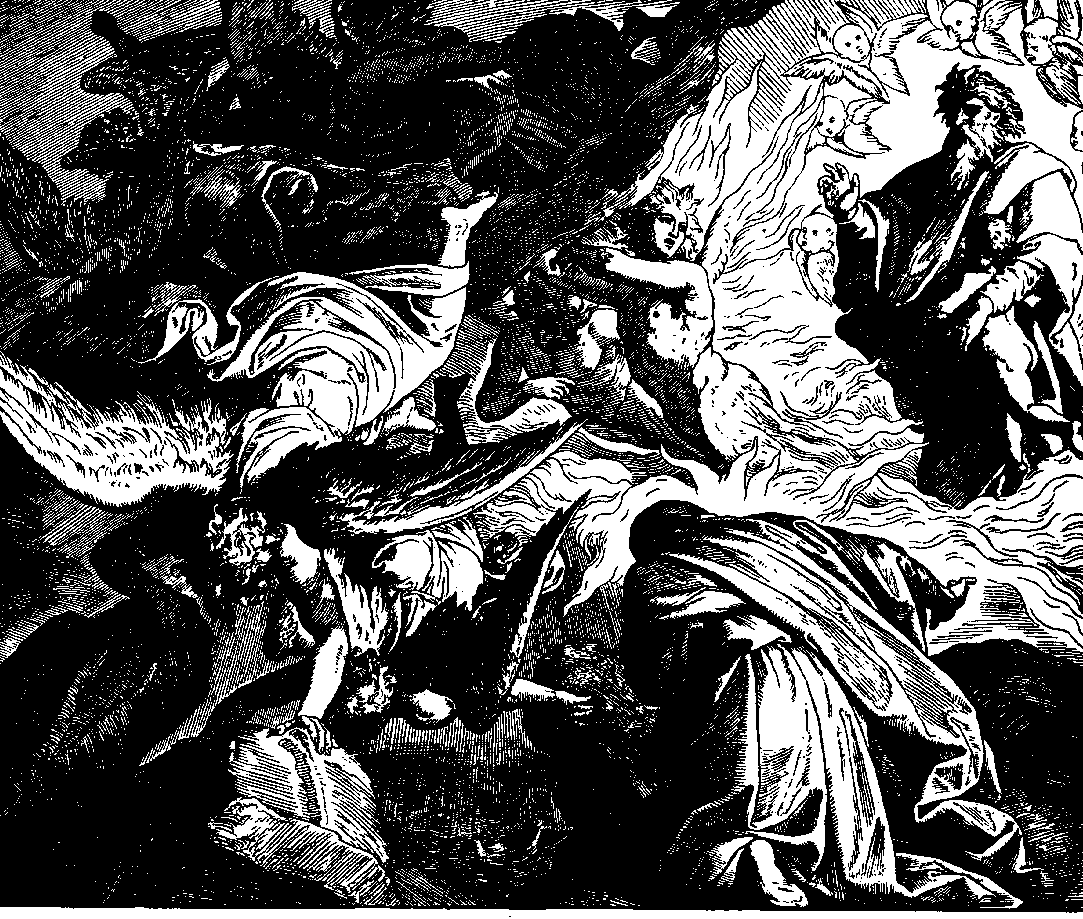
God Appears to Elijah on Mount Horeb, 1860 woodcut by Julius Schnorr von Karolsfeld

^{11} And he said, Go forth, and stand upon the mount before the Lord. And, behold, the Lord passed by,
and a great and strong wind rent the mountains, and brake in pieces the rocks before the Lord; but the Lord was not in the wind:
and after the wind an earthquake; but the Lord was not in the earthquake:
^{12} And after the earthquake a fire; but the Lord was not in the fire:
and after the fire a still small voice.

- "A still small voice": or "a delicate whispering voice", "a low whisper" (ESV) or "a sound, a thin silence" from Hebrew קול דממה דקה, qōl' də-mā-māh ḏaqāh; can be rendered as "a voice of gentle silence". "Demamah" is an onomatopoetic word meaning "whisper", rendered as "silence" in Job 4:16. This is not unconnected to God's instructions to Elijah to anoint Hazael, Jehu and Elisha, to set up a new order that would 'bring about the final victory over Baal worship', not by 'spectacular demonstrations of divine power' as in chapter 18, but 'through a (quieter) political process' in which God removed some kings and appointed others.

== Elijah charges Elisha (19:19–21) ==
In his lifetime, Elijah only fulfilled one out of three required appointments in 19:15-16, that is of Elisha, who would fulfill the other two appointments, when he later took over Elijah's staff (or his mantle, which was apparently his hallmark; cf. 2 Kings 2:8,14; in 1 Kings 1:8 a different Hebrew word is used). Becoming Elijah's disciple ("servant") required Elisha, who appeared to be a rich farmer, to relinquish his property and family and only to 'follow' Elijah (cf. Matthew 4:19; 8:18–22). After Elijah was taken up to heaven, Elisha would anoint Hazael (2 Kings 8:7–15) and Jehu (1 Kings 9:1–13).

=== Verse 19 ===
So he departed thence, and found Elisha the son of Shaphat, who was plowing with twelve yoke of oxen before him, and he with the twelfth: and Elijah passed by him, and cast his mantle upon him.

- "Cast his mantle": This act was apparently a part of the form of adoption of a child, here in spiritual significance, which Elisha correctly understood after a moment's bewilderment. The mantle would have been 'the rough hair-mantle characteristic of the ascetic recluse' as described of Elijah in 2 Kings 1:8, and, in the New Testament, of John the Baptist, as well as included in a warning in Zechariah 13:4 that the prophets ‘shall not wear a rough garment (Revised Version: 'a hairy mantle') to deceive.’

=== Verse 21 ===
And he returned back from him, and took a yoke of oxen, and slew them, and boiled their flesh with the instruments of the oxen, and gave unto the people, and they did eat. Then he arose, and went after Elijah, and ministered unto him.

- "And ministered unto him": from Hebrew: וַיְשָׁרְתֵֽהוּ way-shā-rə-ṯê-hū, literally, "and became his servant", using the same root word to describe the relationship of Joshua with Moses (cf. Exodus 24:13; 33:11; Numbers 11:28). Elisha decisively turned his back on the life he had by 'destroying his previous means of sustenance' (cf. 1 Samuel 11:5–7) and became fully enlisted as Elijah's servant.

== See also ==
- Abel-meholah
- Asherah
- Baal
- Cave of Elijah
- Damascus
- Idolatry
- Israel
- Jezreel
- Prophet
- Syria
- Tribe of Judah
- Related Bible parts: 1 Kings 17, 1 Kings 18, 2 Kings 1, 2 Kings 2, 2 Kings 8, 2 Kings 9, Zechariah 13, Matthew 4,

== Sources ==
- Collins, John J. (2014). "Chapter 14: 1 Kings 12 – 2 Kings 25". Introduction to the Hebrew Scriptures. Fortress Press. pp. 277–296. ISBN 978-1451469233.
- Coogan, Michael David (2007). Coogan, Michael David; Brettler, Marc Zvi; Newsom, Carol Ann; Perkins, Pheme (eds.). The New Oxford Annotated Bible with the Apocryphal/Deuterocanonical Books: New Revised Standard Version, Issue 48 (Augmented 3rd ed.). Oxford University Press. ISBN 978-0195288810.
- Dietrich, Walter (2007). "13. 1 and 2 Kings". In Barton, John; Muddiman, John (eds.). The Oxford Bible Commentary (first (paperback) ed.). Oxford University Press. pp. 232–266. ISBN 978-0199277186.
- Halley, Henry H. (1965). Halley's Bible Handbook: an abbreviated Bible commentary (24th (revised) ed.). Zondervan Publishing House. ISBN 0-310-25720-4.
- Hayes, Christine (2015). Introduction to the Bible. Yale University Press. ISBN 978-0300188271.
- Leithart, Peter J. (2006). 1 & 2 Kings. Brazos Theological Commentary on the Bible. Brazos Press. ISBN 978-1587431258.
- McKane, William (1993). "Kings, Book of". In Metzger, Bruce M; Coogan, Michael D (eds.). The Oxford Companion to the Bible. Oxford University Press. pp. 409–413. ISBN 978-0195046458.
- Metzger, Bruce M; Coogan, Michael D, eds. (1993). The Oxford Companion to the Bible. Oxford University Press. ISBN 978-0195046458.
- Würthwein, Ernst (1995). The Text of the Old Testament. Translated by Rhodes, Erroll F. Grand Rapids, MI: Wm. B. Eerdmans. ISBN 0-8028-0788-7.
