= 1 Kings 17 =

1 Kings, chapter 17

- ← chapter 16 chapter 18 →
- The pages containing the Books of Kings (1 & 2 Kings) Leningrad Codex (1008 CE).
- Book: First book of Kings
- Hebrew Bible part: Nevi'im
- Order in the Hebrew part: 4
- Category: Former Prophets
- Christian Bible part: Old Testament
- Order in the Christian part: 11

1 Kings 17 is the seventeenth chapter of the Books of Kings in the Hebrew Bible or the First Book of Kings in the Old Testament of the Christian Bible. The book is a compilation of various annals recording the acts of the kings of Israel and Judah by a Deuteronomic compiler in the seventh century BCE, with a supplement added in the sixth century BCE. This chapter belongs to the section comprising 1 Kings 16:15 to 2 Kings 8:29 which documents the period of Omri's dynasty. The focus of this chapter is the activity of prophet Elijah during the reign of king Ahab in the northern kingdom.

== Text ==
This chapter was originally written in the Hebrew language and since the 16th century is divided into 24 verses.

=== Textual witnesses ===
Some early manuscripts containing the text of this chapter in Hebrew are of the Masoretic Text tradition, which includes the Codex Cairensis (895), Aleppo Codex (10th century), and Codex Leningradensis (1008).

There is also a translation into Koine Greek known as the Septuagint, made in the last few centuries BCE. Extant ancient manuscripts of the Septuagint version include Codex Vaticanus (B; $\mathfrak{G}$^{B}; 4th century) and Codex Alexandrinus (A; $\mathfrak{G}$^{A}; 5th century). (Note: The whole book of 1 Kings is missing from the extant Codex Sinaiticus.)

== Elijah's conflict with Ahab and his flight (17:1–6) ==
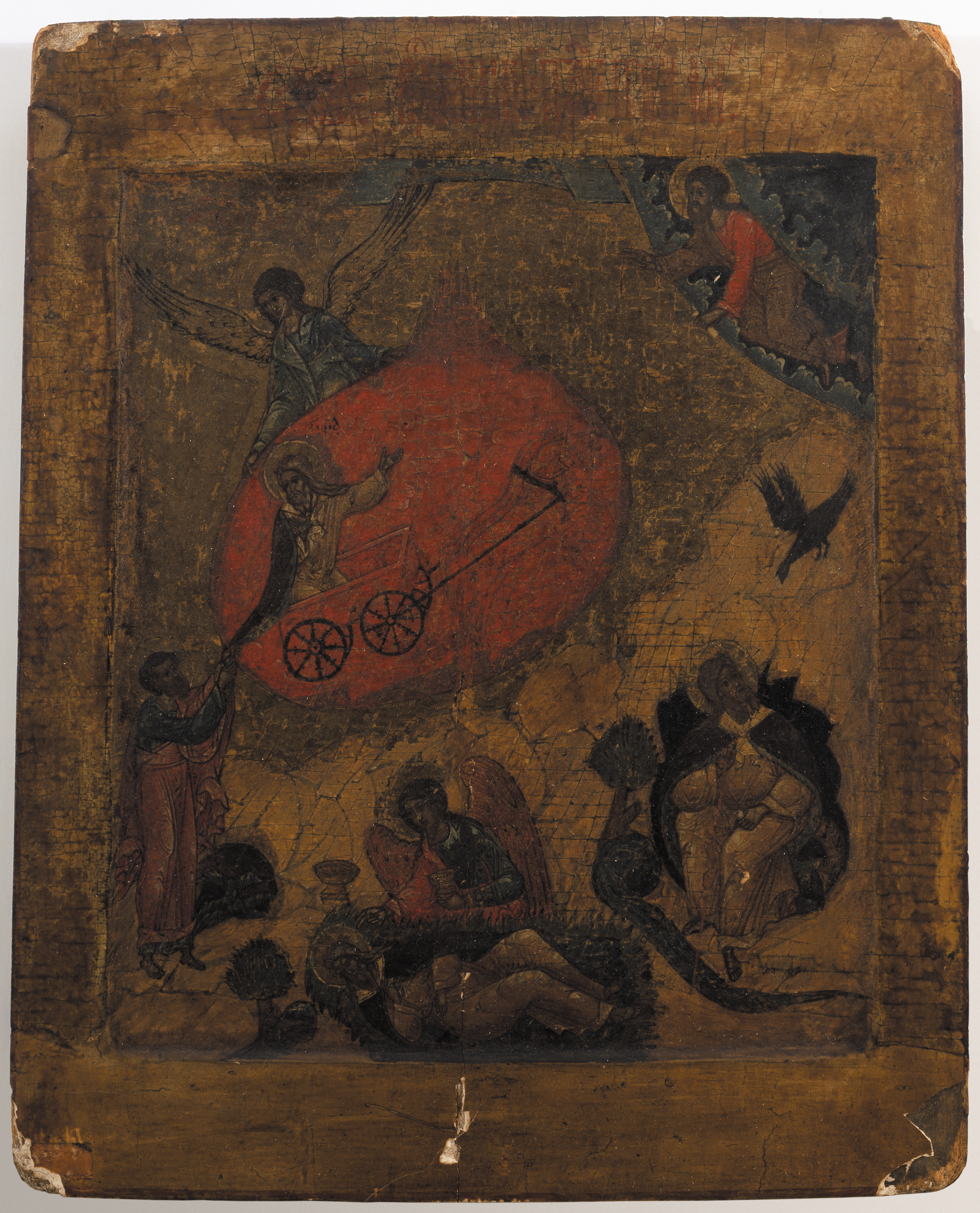
"Elijah and the Raven" by anonymous painter, between c. 1600 and 1699. Albright-Knox Art Gallery

Following the list of Ahab's mistakes in the previous chapter, prophet Elijah suddenly appeared to confront the king with Yahweh's word against Ahab's policy of syncretizing the worship of Yahweh and Baal, and declaring the war against Baal (as the god of fertility and rain) that the land would suffer drought and hunger (only Yahweh can control rain). This set up a tense conflict between the worship of the two deities which would be resolved in 1 Kings 18:41-5. As soon as he finished with his message, Elijah withdrew to a small east Jordanian river valley, being fed by the usually greedy (ravenous) ravens.

=== Verse 1 ===
And Elijah the Tishbite, of the inhabitants of Gilead, said to Ahab, "As the Lord God of Israel lives, before whom I stand, there shall not be dew nor rain these years, except at my word."

- "Elijah": his name means: 'My God is Yahweh!', and his stories depict him as a man led by God and obedient to him.
- "Tishbite": or "from Tishbe", here is a place in Gilead, not a place with similar name in the territory of Naphtali, which was the birthplace of Tobit (Tobit 1:2).
- "These years": or "these following years", which were three and a half years according to Luke 4:25 and James 5:17.

== Elijah and the widow in Zarephath (17:7–16) ==
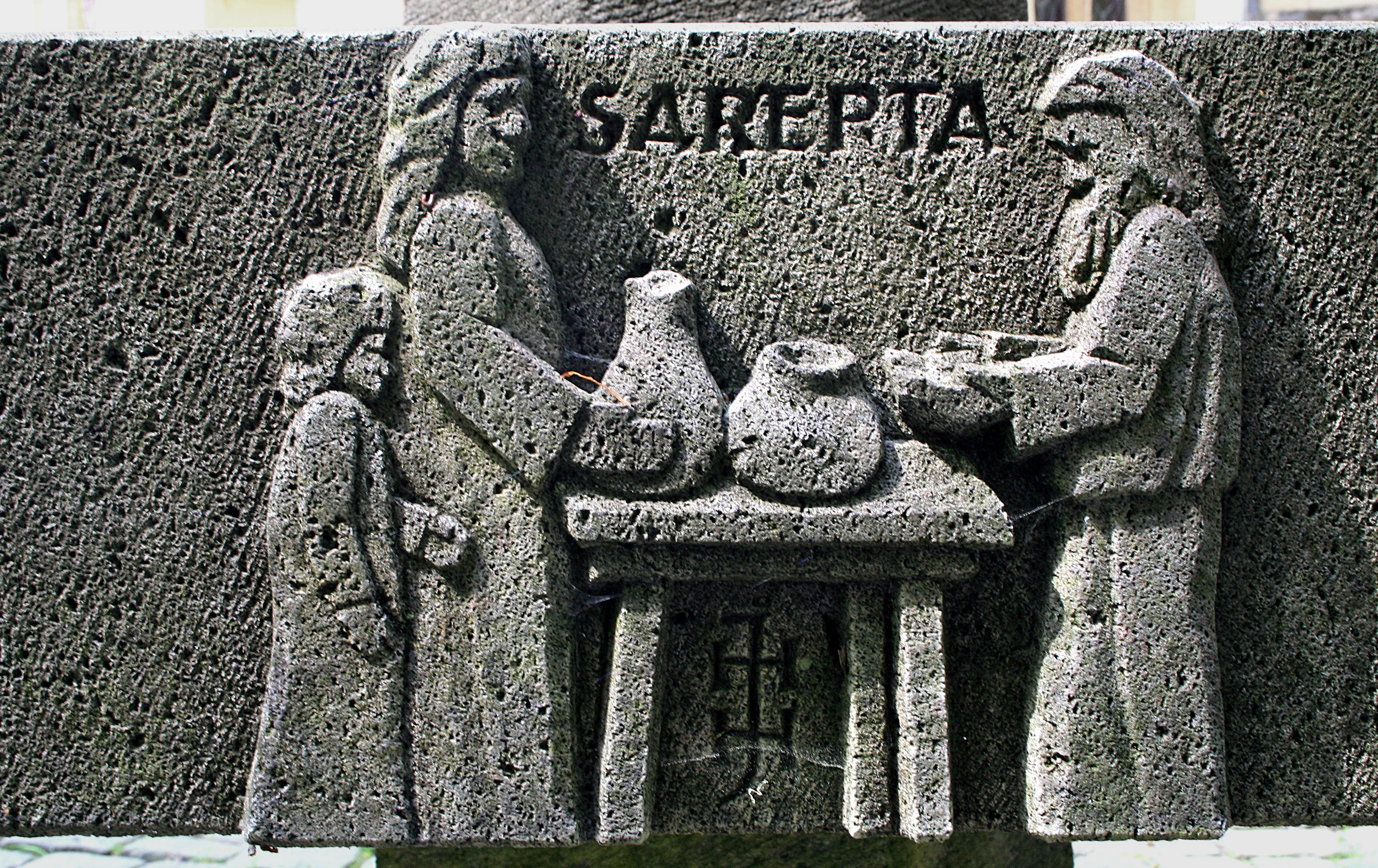
Elijah and the widow in Sarepta (Zarephath). A sculpture at Sayn Abbey

After a period of time, Elijah experienced the same drought as the people of Israel, with the brook near where he lived, the wadi Cherith (see verse 3), running dry, so God sent him to the Sidon region, on the coast of Phoenicia (modern Lebanon), home of Queen Jezebel, and the heartland of Baal worship (cf. 1 Kings 16:31). Elijah was to find a widow to feed him there by having randomly asked a woman at the gates of Zarephath for water and then for bread. When she claimed, 'as Yahweh your God lives', that she and her son are starving themselves, Elijah repeated his wish, but adding the soothing words, 'Do not be afraid', and a prophecy of an endless supply of food, which happened as Elijah had said.

== Elijah awakens the dead (17:17–24) ==
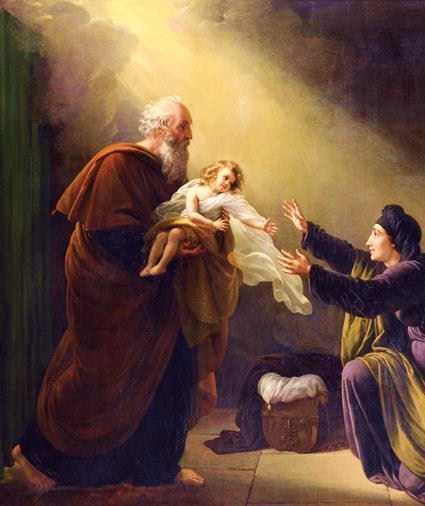
Elijah reviving the Son of the Widow of Zarephath by Louis Hersent

This story as the previous one involves the same three people and deals with the same question of whether it is worthwhile to support the men of God, whose presence might bring not only death (by revealing sins and bestowing punishment, verse 18), but also life. The narrative is closely related to that in 2 Kings 4:18-37, showing that while a prophet 'plays the role of a magician reviving a dead soul by a ritual action', only God has the authority over life and death (the prophet had to plead twice to God).

There are notable parallels of this narrative with the raising of the son of the widow of Nain in Luke 7, especially some verbal parallels. The raising of the son of the woman of Shunem (2 Kings 4) by Elisha is also similar, giving an example of a repeated pattern in the history of redemption.

== See also ==
- Cherith
- Gilead
- Idolatry
- Israel
- Jordan River
- Prophet
- Zarephath
- Related Bible parts: 1 Kings 16, 2 Kings 4, 2 Chronicles 17, Luke 4, Luke 7, James 5

== Sources ==
- Collins, John J. (2014). "Chapter 14: 1 Kings 12 – 2 Kings 25". Introduction to the Hebrew Scriptures. Fortress Press. pp. 277–296. ISBN 978-1451469233.
- Coogan, Michael David (2007). Coogan, Michael David; Brettler, Marc Zvi; Newsom, Carol Ann; Perkins, Pheme (eds.). The New Oxford Annotated Bible with the Apocryphal/Deuterocanonical Books: New Revised Standard Version, Issue 48 (Augmented 3rd ed.). Oxford University Press. ISBN 978-0195288810.
- Dietrich, Walter (2007). "13. 1 and 2 Kings". In Barton, John; Muddiman, John (eds.). The Oxford Bible Commentary (first (paperback) ed.). Oxford University Press. pp. 232–266. ISBN 978-0199277186.
- Halley, Henry H. (1965). Halley's Bible Handbook: an abbreviated Bible commentary (24th (revised) ed.). Zondervan Publishing House. ISBN 0-310-25720-4.
- Hayes, Christine (2015). Introduction to the Bible. Yale University Press. ISBN 978-0300188271.
- Leithart, Peter J. (2006). 1 & 2 Kings. Brazos Theological Commentary on the Bible. Brazos Press. ISBN 978-1587431258.
- McKane, William (1993). "Kings, Book of". In Metzger, Bruce M; Coogan, Michael D (eds.). The Oxford Companion to the Bible. Oxford University Press. pp. 409–413. ISBN 978-0195046458.
- Metzger, Bruce M; Coogan, Michael D, eds. (1993). The Oxford Companion to the Bible. Oxford University Press. ISBN 978-0195046458.
- Würthwein, Ernst (1995). The Text of the Old Testament. Translated by Rhodes, Erroll F. Grand Rapids, MI: Wm. B. Eerdmans. ISBN 0-8028-0788-7.
