= Jaroslav of Bezmíře =

Bohemian inquisitor and Bishop of Sarepta

- Titular Bishop of Sarepta
- Church: Roman Catholic Church
- Appointed: July 1394

Jaroslav of Bezmíře, also known as Jaroslav of Benešov, was a Bohemian inquisitor and Bishop of Sarepta.

Jaroslav was appointed Bishop of Sarepta by Pope Boniface IX on 15 July 1394. He was considered a very active Bishop, and likely began to act as a inquisitor in 1407. He advised Zbyněk Zajíc of Hazmburk at the Roman Curia. In 1410, he participated in the trial in Bologna that condemned the writings of John Wycliffe.

== In popular culture ==
A fictionalized Jaroslav, named Inquisitor Jaroslav, is portrayed in the 2018 video game Kingdom Come: Deliverance.
