= Raising of the son of the widow of Zarephath =

Miracle of the Hebrew prophet Elijah

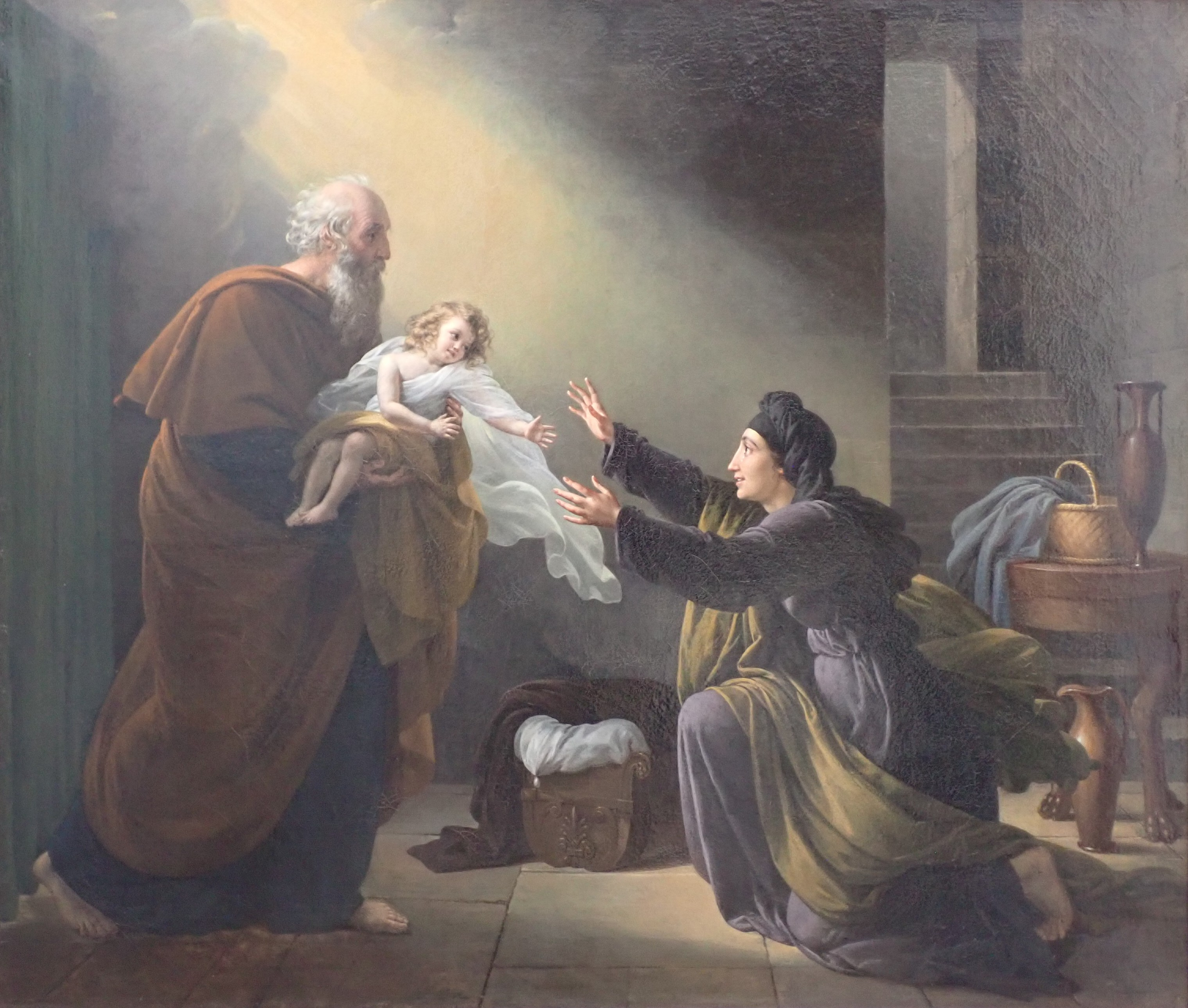
Painting by Louise Hersent, 1819

The raising of the son of the widow of Zarephath is a miracle of the prophet Elijah recorded in the Hebrew Bible, 1 Kings 17, taking place in the Phoenician city of Zarephath.

== Background ==
In 1 Kings 17 the Bible first mentions Elijah by name, identifying him as a Tishbite from Gilead, who conveys to King Ahab a message from God that there will be no rain in the land until God declare it. God tells Elijah to hide by the Brook Cherith, where ravens, as commanded by God, feed him bread and meat.

After a while, due to the drought, the brook dries up, so God inspires Elijah to go to the town of Sarepta (Zarephath) and to seek out a widow to find him water and food. The widow tells Elijah that she and her son between them have only enough flour and oil for one more meal before they die; despite this, the widow helps Elijah. The flour and the oil do not run out: "[The widow had] a handful of meal in a barrel, and a little oil in a cruse .. and the barrel of meal wasted not, neither did the cruse of oil fail". (The proverbial phrase "the widow's cruse", meaning an inexhaustible supply, refers to this situation.)

== Elijah, the widow and the widow's son ==
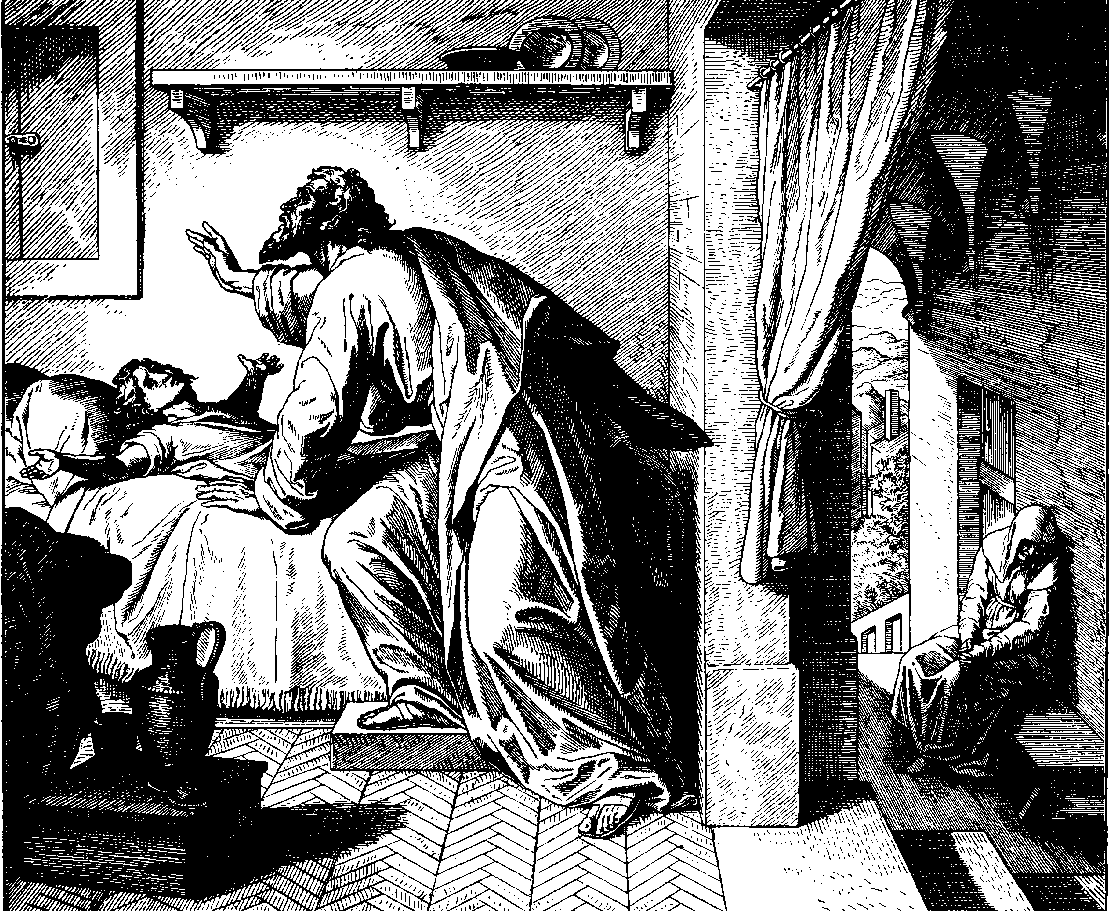
1860 woodcut by Julius Schnorr von Karolsfeld

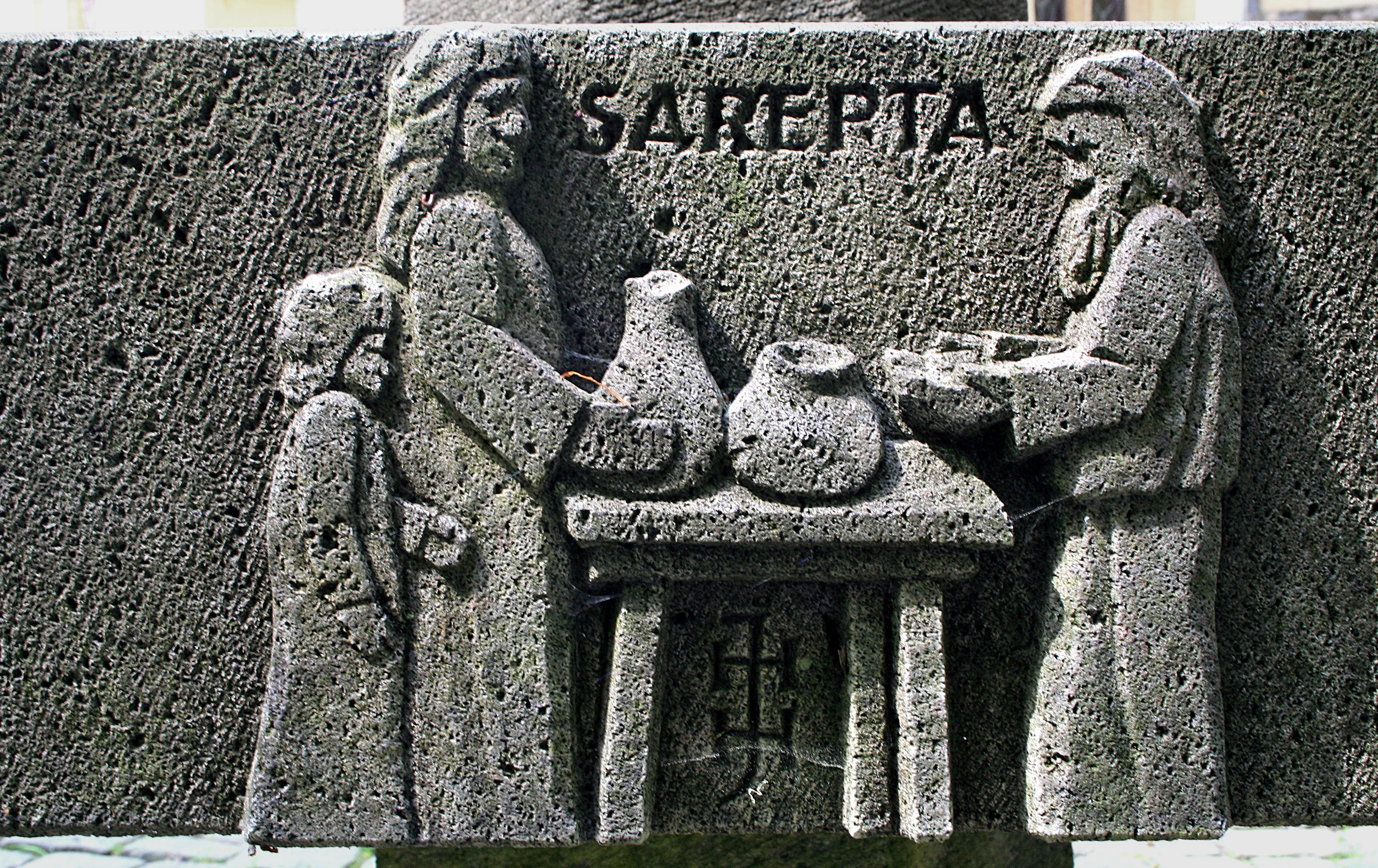
A sculpture at Sayn Abbey

1 Kings 17:17-18 After this the son of the woman, the mistress of the house became ill. And his illness was so severe that there was no breath left in him 18 And she said to Elijah, "What have you against me, O man of God? You have come to me to bring my sin and remembrance and to cause the death of my son!"

Victor H. Matthews suggests that the woman "uses sarcasm which is designed to shame the prophet for being the cause of her son's death." Elijah does not try and rationalise with the grieving woman and takes the son up to his bedroom where he prays to God asking for his help.

1 Kings 17:21-22 And he stretched himself upon the child three times, and cried unto the Lord, and said, "O Lord my God, I pray thee, let this child's soul come into him again". 22 And the Lord heard the voice of Elijah; and the soul of the child came into him again, and he revived.

He then takes the child downstairs again and presents him, living, to his mother. This causes her to declare "Now by this I know that thou art a man of God" (v24), Elijah therefore "regains his honor and his status."

Rabbi Eliezer ben Hyrcanus, also known as Rabbi Eliezer Hagadol, relates that the son raised by Elijah was none other than the prophet Jonah, most notably associated with the incident involving a giant fish. Commentators have noted verbal parallels with the raising of the son of the widow of Nain in the Gospel of Luke chapter 7. The miracle is represented in the Dura synagogue murals.
