= Shaphat =

Shaphat (Hebrew: שָׁפָט; Latin and Douay–Rheims: Saphat) of Abel-meholah: a man in the Bible, father of Elisha.

And Jehu the son of Nimshi shalt thou anoint to be king over Israel: and Elisha the son of Shaphat of Abelmeholah shalt thou anoint to be prophet in thy room.

And it shall come to pass, that him that escapeth the sword of Hazael shall Jehu slay: and him that escapeth from the sword of Jehu shall Elisha slay. Yet I have left me seven thousand in Israel, all the knees which have not bowed unto Baal, and every mouth which hath not kissed him.

So he departed thence, and found Elisha the son of Shaphat, who was plowing with twelve yoke of oxen before him, and he with the twelfth: and Elijah passed by him, and cast his mantle upon him.

— 1 Kings 19:16-19

After this occurred, Elisha left to follow Elijah after saying his farewells to his father Shaphat and the rest of his family.
