= Church of the Resurrection of the Widow's Son =

Coordinates: 32.6307°N 35.3501°E

- כנסיית בן האלמנה
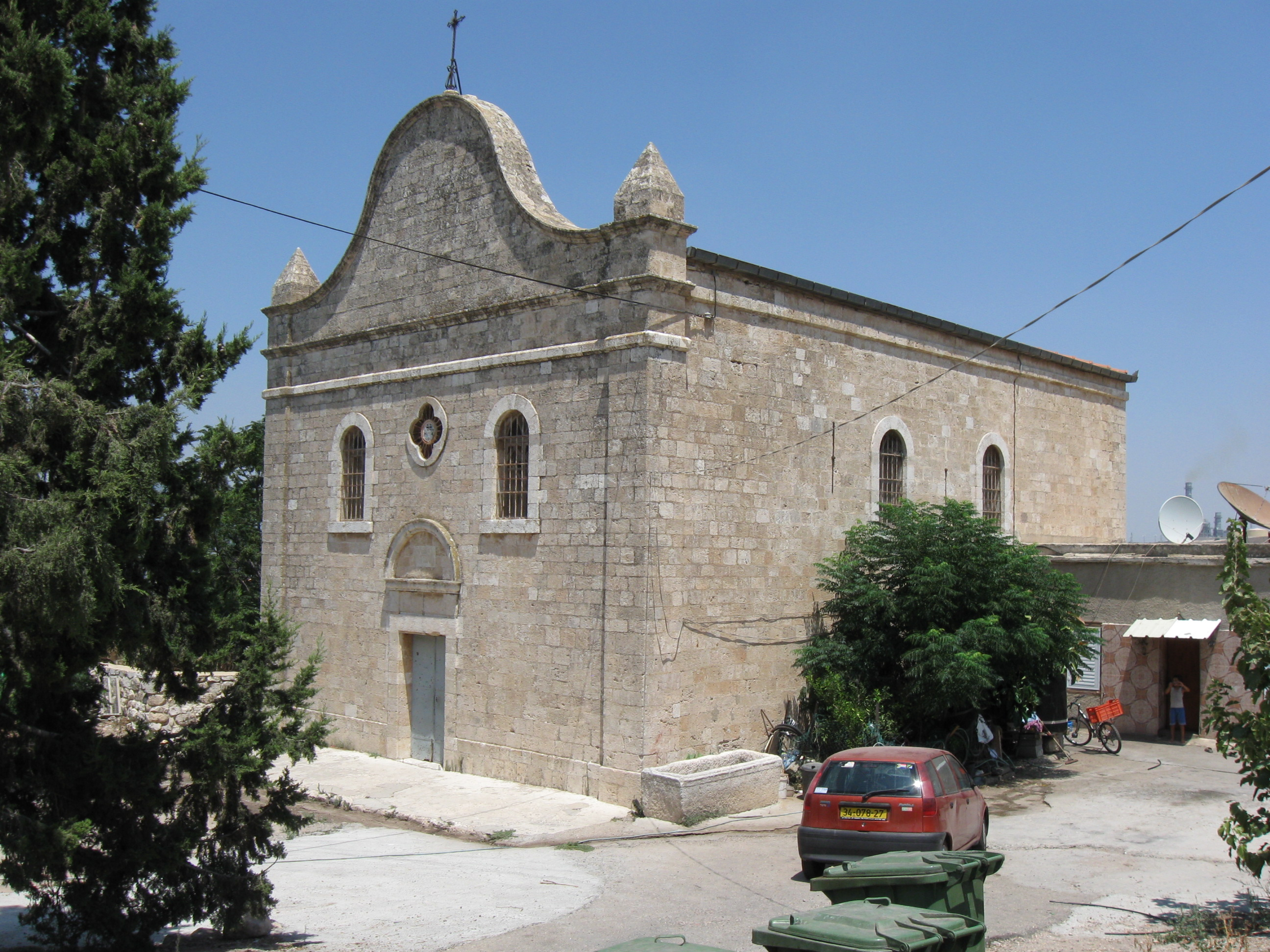
- Church of the Resurrection of the Widow's Son
- Location: Nein
- Country: Israel
- Denomination: Roman Catholic Church

The Church of the Resurrection of the Widow's Son (Hebrew: כנסיית בן האלמנה) or simply the Church of the Son of the Widow, is a religious building affiliated with the Catholic Church and is located in the village of Nein in northern Israel. It is dedicated to the resurrection of the son of the widow of Nain, one of the miracles of Jesus described in the Bible.

The Church of the Resurrection of the widow's son is in the central part of the village Na'in, on the northern slope of Mount Moreh (515 m asl) in the Lower Galilee in northern Israel.

The exact date of construction has been established between the fourth and fifth centuries. Thus, the town of Nain became a Christian pilgrimage destination, and the church quickly became known as a holy place. In 1881 the place was taken by the Franciscans, who, on the foundations of the old church, built the small contemporary temple. From 2013 an attempt was made to start the renovation work that could not be performed because the work was interrupted by local Arab groups.

In December 2019, it was announced that the church would be reopening, following renovations of the church and its area. A small convent for the Franciscan friars is also planned.

== See also ==
- Roman Catholicism in Israel
- Raising of the son of the widow of Nain

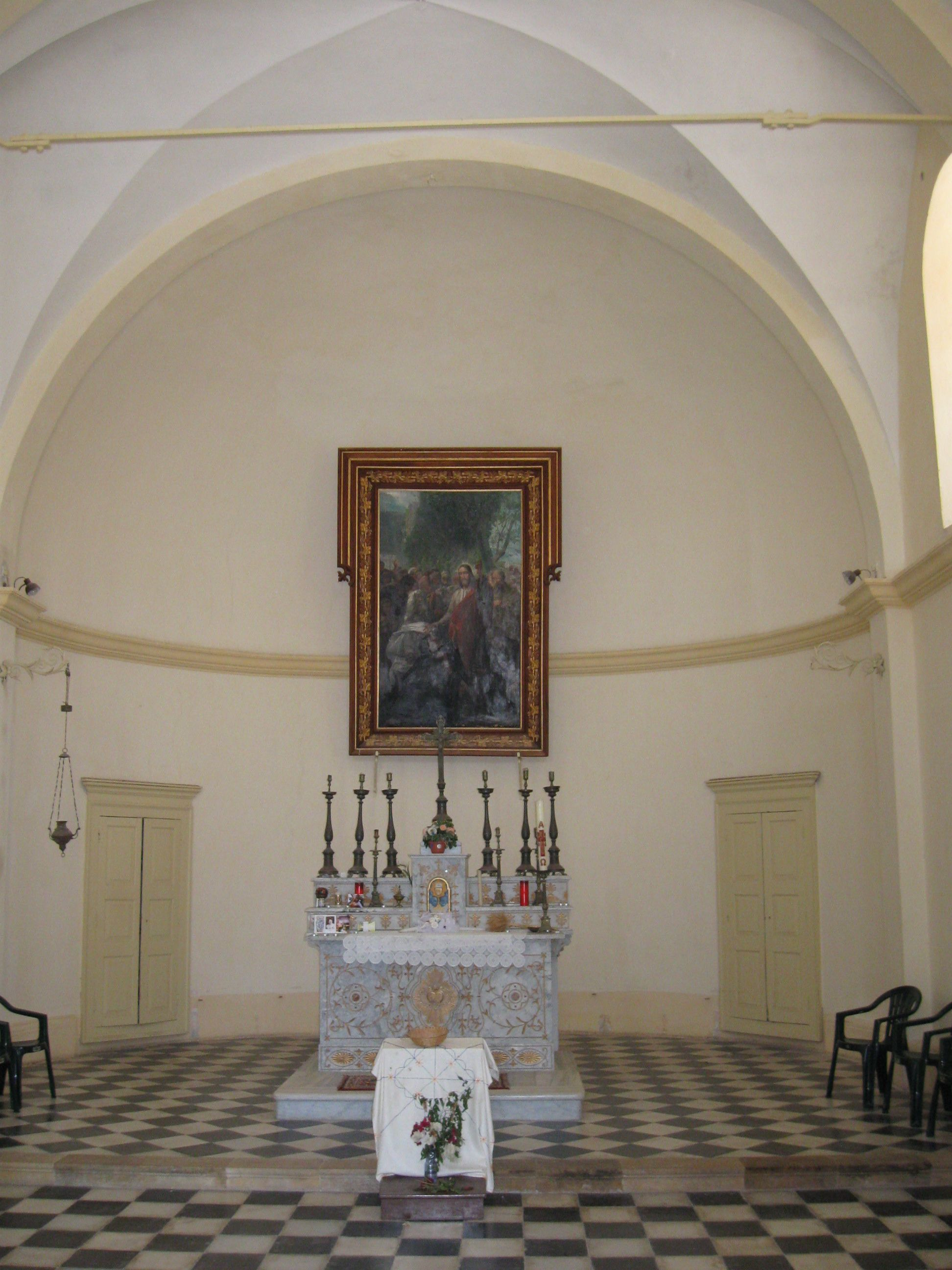
Interior view
