= Elisha =

Prophet and wonder-worker in the Hebrew Bible

Prophet Elisha
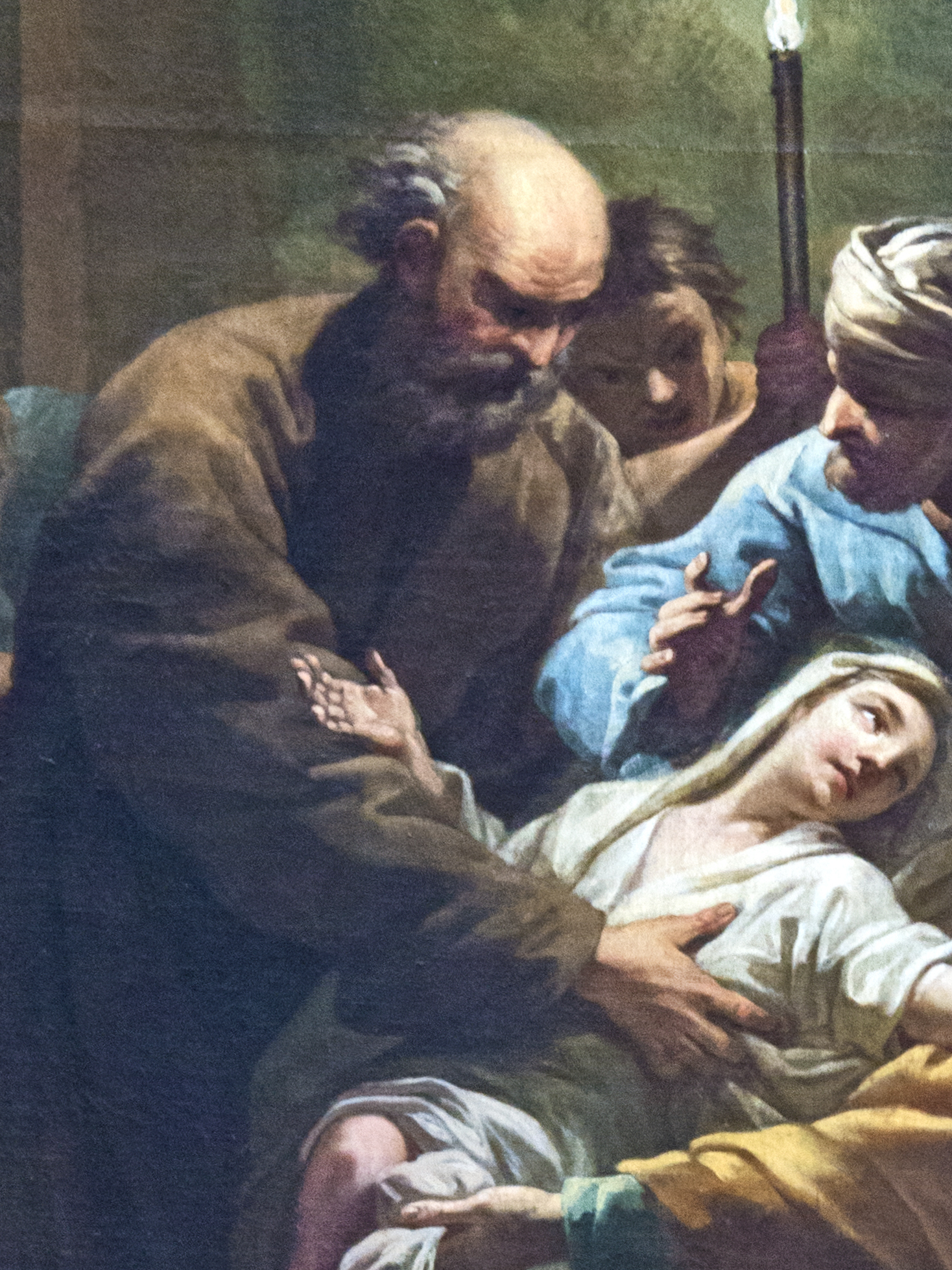
- Detail from Elisha resurrecting the son of the Shunammite by Jean-Baptiste Despax, mid-18th century

Saint
- Born: Approximately c. 910 BCE
- Died: Approximately c. 800 BCE; Samaria
- Venerated in: Judaism; Christianity; Islam; Bahá'í Faith; Druze faith; Rastafari
- Feast: June 14 (liturgical calendars of the Eastern Orthodox and Eastern Catholic Churches)
- Influences: Elijah

Elisha (Note: /ɪˈlaɪʃə/; Hebrew: אֱלִישָׁע, Modern: ʼElīšaʻ, Tiberian: ʼĔlīšāʻ, 'My El is salvation' or 'God is my salvation'; Koine Greek: Ἐλισ[σ]αῖος Elis[s]aîos or Ἐλισαιέ Elisaié; Latin: Eliseus) was, according to the Hebrew Bible, an Israelite prophet and a wonder-worker. His name is commonly transliterated into English as Elisha via Hebrew, Eliseus via Greek and Latin, Ełishe (Yeghishe/Elisha) via Armenian or Alyasa via Arabic, and Elyasa or Elyesa via Turkish. Also mentioned in the New Testament and the Quran,^{[6:86]}^{[38:48]} Elisha is venerated as a prophet in Judaism, Christianity and Islam and writings of the Bahá'í Faith refer to him by name.

Before he settled in Samaria, Elisha passed some time on Mount Carmel. He served from 892 until 832 BCE as an advisor to the third through the eighth kings of Israel, holding the office of "prophet in Israel". He was frequently mentioned as “the man of God” throughout narrative, often correcting Kings and leaders who did evil in the sight of the Hebrew God. He was named “the chariots of Israel and its horsemen” according to King Jehoash in 2 Kings 13:14.

In the biblical narrative, he is a disciple and protégé of Elijah, and after Elijah was taken up in a whirlwind, Elisha received a double portion of his power and he was accepted as the leader of the sons of the prophets. Elisha then went on to perform twice as many miracles as Elijah.

Scholars hold different opinions regarding the historical background, composition and social context of the Elisha narratives. The stories give unique insights into the folk religion of the Kingdom of Israel.

== Biblical narratives ==
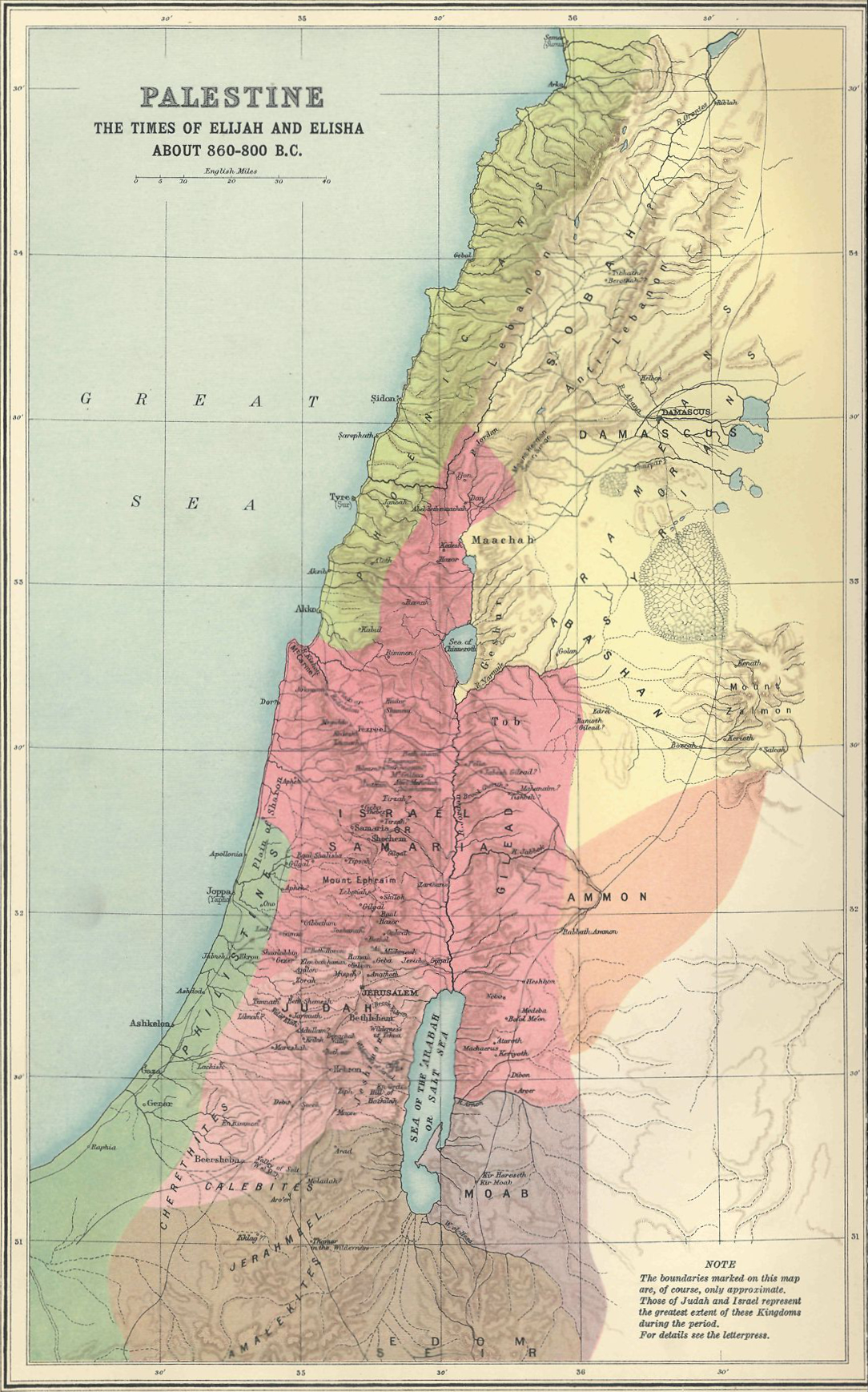
Map of Israel within the Palestine region during the times of Elisha

The story of Elisha is told in the Hebrew Bible/Old Testament in 1 Kings 19 and 2 Kings 2 through 2 Kings 9, ending in 2 Kings 13. He is mentioned again in the New Testament in Luke 4 (Luke 4:27).

=== Anointing ===
Elisha's story is related in the Books of Kings (Second Scroll, chapters 2–14) in the Hebrew Bible (part of the Nevi'im). According to this story, he was a prophet and a wonder-worker of the Kingdom of Israel who was active during the reigns of Joram, Jehu, Jehoahaz, and Jehoash (Joash). Elisha was the son of Shaphat, a wealthy land-owner of Abel-meholah; he became the attendant and disciple of Elijah.

His name first occurs in chapter 19 of the Books of Kings in the command given to Elijah to anoint him as his successor. After learning in the cave on Mount Horeb, that Elisha, the son of Shaphat, had been selected by Yahweh as his successor in the prophetic office, Elijah set out to find him. On his way from Mount Horeb to Damascus, Elijah found Elisha ploughing with twelve yokes of oxen. Elijah went over to him, threw his mantle over Elisha's shoulders, investing him with the prophetic office. Elisha delayed only long enough to kill the yoke of oxen, whose flesh he boiled with the wood of his plough. After he had shared this farewell repast with his father, mother, and friends, the newly chosen prophet "went after Elijah, and ministered unto him". Elisha became Elijah's close attendant until Elijah entered heaven alive, although no details of Elisha are given during those years.

=== Elijah taken in the whirlwind ===
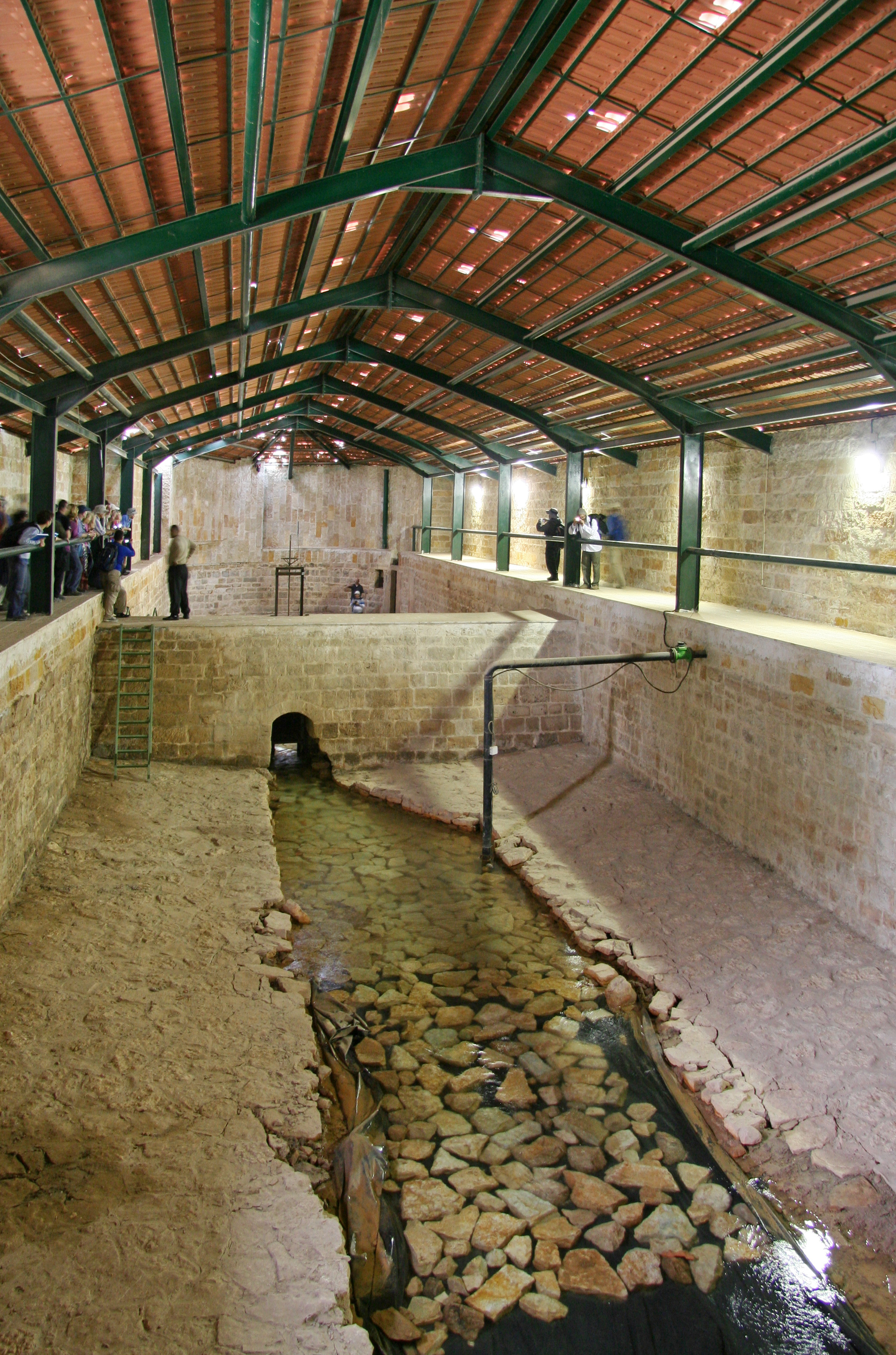
Ein es-Sultan in Jericho (also known as "Elisha's Spring"), believed to be the fountain purified by Elisha in 2 Kings 2:19–22, now inside a protective building

Elisha accompanied Elijah to Jericho, where according to 2 Kings 2:3–9, "the sons of the prophets" tell Elisha that the LORD "will take away thy master from thy head to-day".

The story of the departure of Elijah and of Elisha inheriting his powers is told in 2 Kings 6–15. Elijah and Elisha went to the Jordan River. Elijah rolls up his mantle and strikes the water, the waters of which divided so as to permit both to pass over on dry ground. Elisha asks to "inherit a double-portion" of Elijah's spirit. Suddenly, a chariot of fire and horses of fire appeared and Elijah was lifted up in a whirlwind. As Elijah was lifted up, his mantle fell to the ground and Elisha picked it up. This is the second time that Elisha comes in contact with his teacher's mantle, which as a cultic vestment is associated with prophetic might and authority.

Some scholars see this as indicative of the property inheritance customs of the time, where the oldest son received twice as much of the father's inheritance as each of the younger sons. In this interpretation Elisha is asking that he may be seen as the "rightful heir" and successor to Elijah. Critics of this view point out that Elisha was already appointed as Elijah's successor earlier in the narrative and that Elisha is described as performing twice as many miracles as Elijah. In this interpretation the "double-portion" is not merely an allusion to primacy in succession, but is instead a request for greater prophetic power even than Elijah.

=== Miracles ===
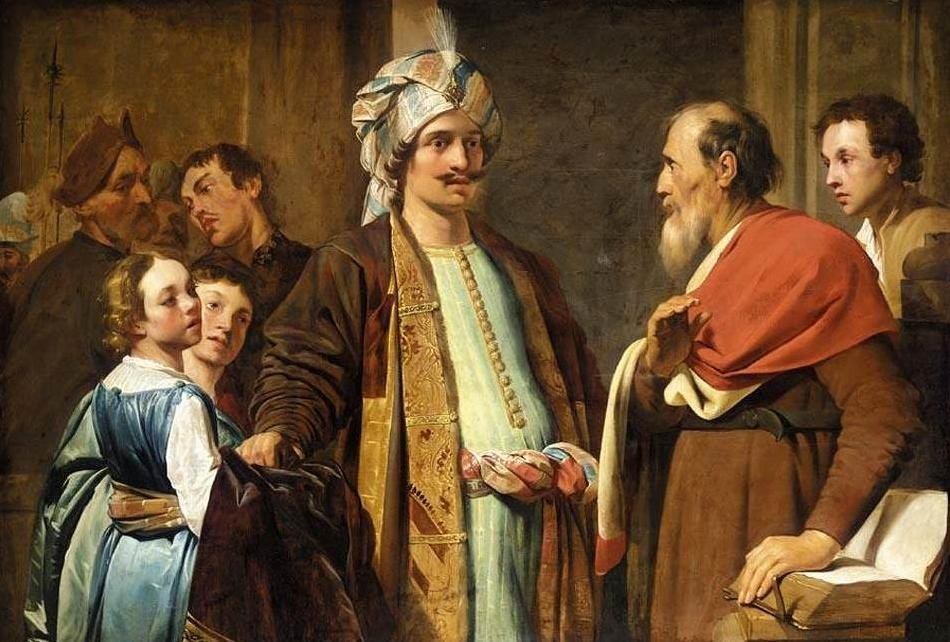
Elisha Refusing the Gifts of Naaman, by Pieter de Grebber 1630

By means of the mantle left to fall from Elijah, Elisha miraculously recrossed the Jordan and returned to Jericho, where he won the gratitude of the people by purifying the unwholesome waters of their spring and making them drinkable.

When the armies of Judah, Israel and Edom, then allied against Mesha, the Moabite king, were being tortured by drought in the Idumean desert, Elisha consented to intervene. His double prediction regarding relief from drought and victory over the Moabites was fulfilled on the following morning.

When a group of boys (or youths) (Note: Hebrew na'ar, translated 'youths' in the New International Version. The Jewish Encyclopedia entry on Elisha states, "The offenders were not children, but were called so ("ne'arim") because they lacked ("meno'arim") all religion (Soṭah 46b)." Although the Authorized King James Version used the words "little children", theologian John Gill stated in his Exposition of the Bible that the word was "used of persons of thirty or forty years of age".) from Bethel taunted the prophet for his baldness, Elisha cursed them in the name of Yahweh and two female bears came out of the forest and tore forty-two of the boys.

To relieve a prophet's widow importuned by a harsh creditor, Elisha multiplied a little oil as to enable her not only to pay her debt but to provide for her family needs. Jewish tradition identifies the widow's husband as Obadiah, the servant of King Ahab, who hid 100 prophets of Yahweh in two caves.

According to 1 Kings 17, Elijah resuscitated a Phoenician boy in the city of Zarephath. In the second Book of Kings, Elisha obtained for a rich lady of Shunem the birth of a son. When the child died some years later, Elisha successfully resuscitated the child.

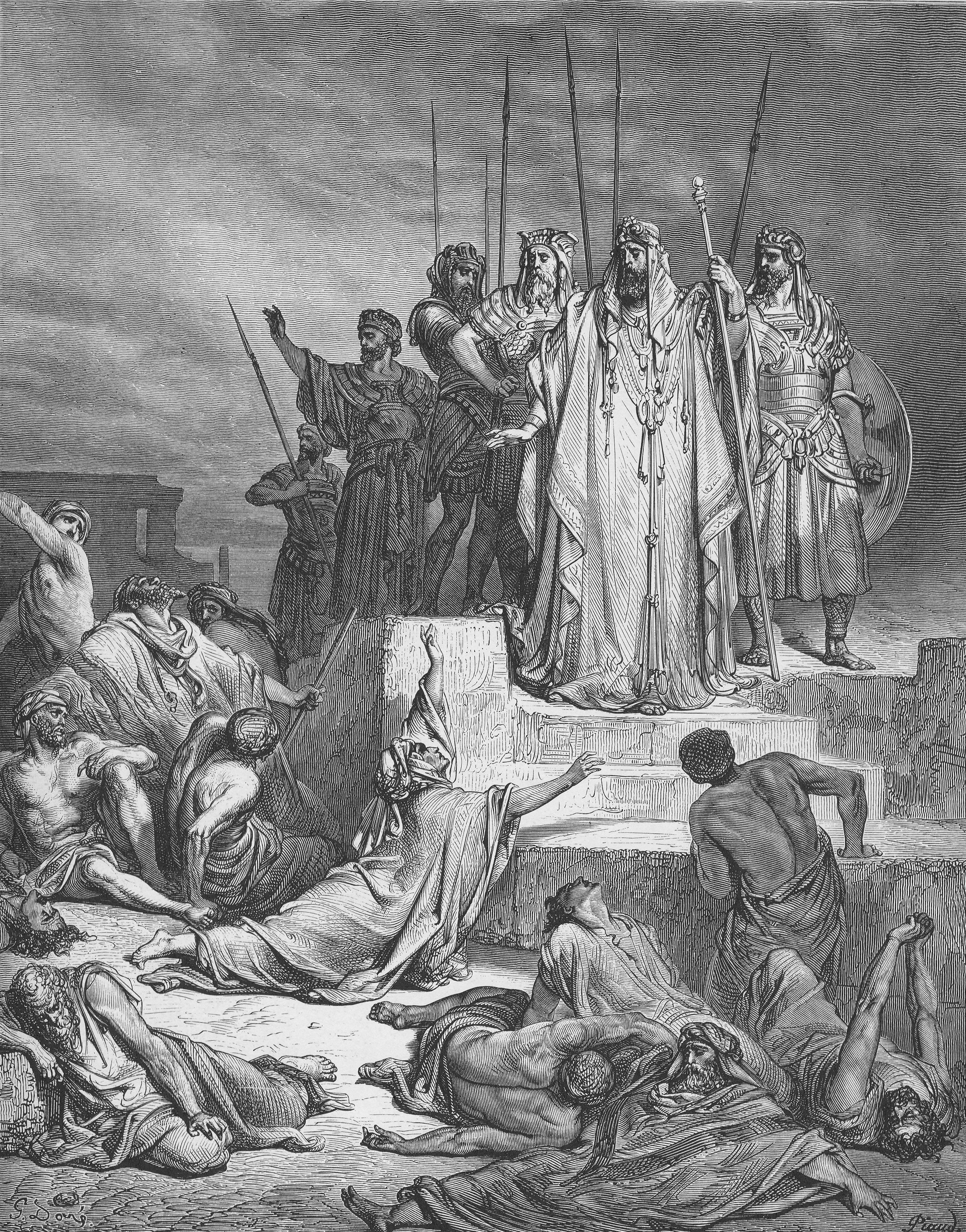
A Famine in Samaria (illustration by Gustave Doré from the 1866 La Sainte Bible)

To nourish the sons of the prophets pressed by famine, Elisha changed a pottage made from poisonous gourds into wholesome food. He fed a hundred men with twenty loaves of new barley, leaving some leftover, in a story which is comparable with the miracles of Jesus in the New Testament.

Elisha cured the Syrian military commander Naaman of leprosy but punished his own servant Gehazi, who took money from Naaman. Naaman, at first reluctant, obeyed Elisha, and washed seven times in the River Jordan. Finding his flesh "restored like the flesh of a little child", the general was so impressed by this evidence of God's power, and by the disinterestedness of his prophet, as to express his deep conviction that "there is no other God in all the earth, but only in Israel." Elisha allowed Naaman to continue in the service of the Syrian king and therefore be present in the worship of Rimmon in the Syrian temple. According to the Gospel of Luke, Jesus referred to Naaman's healing when he said, "And there were many lepers in Israel in the time of Elisha the prophet: and none of them was cleansed but Naaman the Syrian."

Elisha's actions included repeatedly saving King Jehoram of Israel from the ambushes planned by Benhadad, ordering the elders to shut the door against the messenger of Israel's ungrateful king, bewildering with a strange blindness the soldiers of the Syrian king, making iron float to relieve from embarrassment a son of a prophet, and confidently predicting the sudden flight of the enemy at the siege of Samaria and the consequent cessation of the famine in the city,

Elisha then journeyed to Damascus and prophesied that Hazael would be king over Syria. Elisha directs one of the sons of the prophets to anoint Jehu, the son of Jehoshaphat, as king of Israel, and commissions him to cut off the house of Ahab. The death of Jehoram, pierced by an arrow from Jehu's bow, the end of Jezebel, and the slaughter of Ahab's seventy sons, proved how he executed that demand.

=== Elisha's final days ===
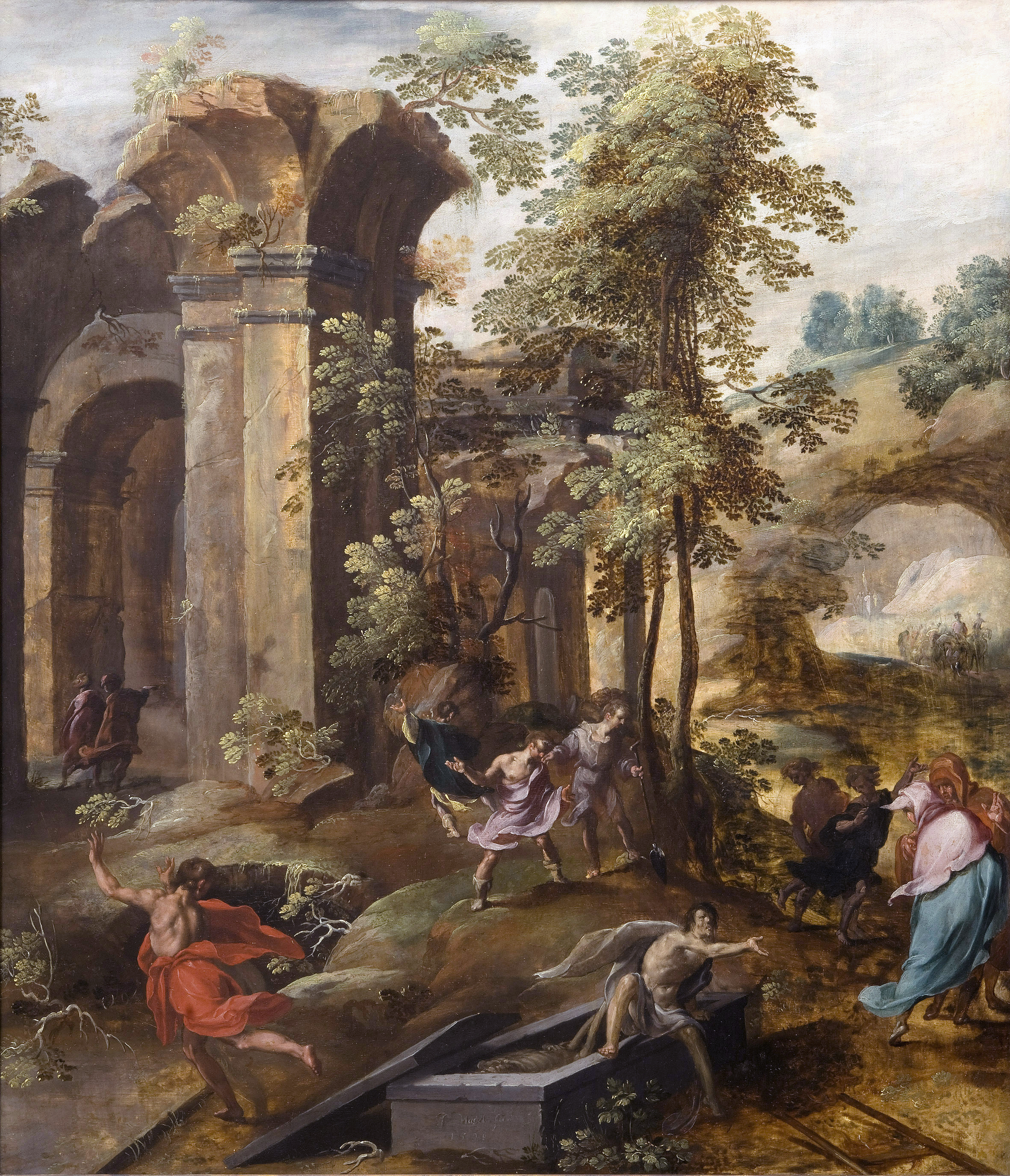
The miracle at the grave of Elisha (Jan Nagel, 1596)

While Elisha lay on his death-bed in his own house, Jehoash of Israel, the grandson of Jehu, came to mourn over his approaching departure, and uttered the same words as those of Elisha when Elijah was taken away, indicating his value to him: "My father, my father! the chariot of Israel, and the horsemen thereof". Jehoash assists Elisha to fire an arrow eastwards from the window of his room, predicting as it lands:

The arrow of the Lord's deliverance and the arrow of deliverance from Syria; for you must strike the Syrians at Aphek till you have destroyed them.

Elisha predicted three successful battles over the Arameans, but no absolute victory. 2 Kings 13:25 records three victories of Joash whereby cities lost to the Arameans, probably on the west bank of the Jordan, were regained.

According to the Books of Kings the year after Elisha's death and burial (or, in the following spring) a body was placed in his grave. As soon as the body touched Elisha's remains the man "revived and stood up on his feet".

== Veneration ==
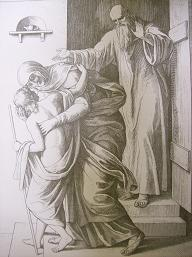
Elisha raises the Shunamite woman's son, woodcut by Julius von Carolsfeld (1794–1872)

Elisha is venerated as a saint in a number of Christian churches. His feast day is on June 14, on the Eastern Orthodox, and Eastern Catholic liturgical calendars (for those churches which use the traditional Julian calendar, June 14 falls on June 27 of the modern Gregorian calendar). The Armenian Apostolic Church commemorates his feast day on the Thursday following the fifth Sunday after Pentecost (July 1 in 2021). John of Damascus composed a canon in honor of Elisha, and a church was built at Constantinople in his honor.

In Western Christianity Elisha is commemorated in the calendar of saints of the Carmelites, a Catholic religious order, who claim a spiritual descent from him, following a decree of the Carmelite General Chapter of 1399. He is also commemorated as a prophet in the Calendar of Saints of the Lutheran Church–Missouri Synod. Both calendars also celebrate him on June 14. Both the Orthodox and Roman Catholics believe that he was unmarried and celibate.

Julian the Apostate (361–363) gave orders to burn the relics of the prophets Elisha, Obadiah and John the Baptist, who were buried next to each other in Sebastia, but they were rescued by the Christians, and part of them were transferred to Alexandria. Today, the relics of Elisha are claimed to be among the possessions of the Coptic Orthodox Monastery of Saint Macarius the Great in Scetes, Egypt.

Elisha is commemorated on 20 June – translation of the relics and garments of the Apostles Luke, Andrew, and Thomas, the Prophet Eliseus, and Martyr Lazarus of Persia found c. 960, during the time of the emperor Romanos Lakapenos (919–944) in a monastery of Saint Augusta into the Church of the Holy Apostles in Constantinople under Emperor Constantine Porphyrogenitus (c. 956–970) by Saint Patriarch Polyeuctus of Constantinople (956–970).

Eliseus is also commemorated on July 20 with Aaron, Elias and Moses.

== In Islam ==
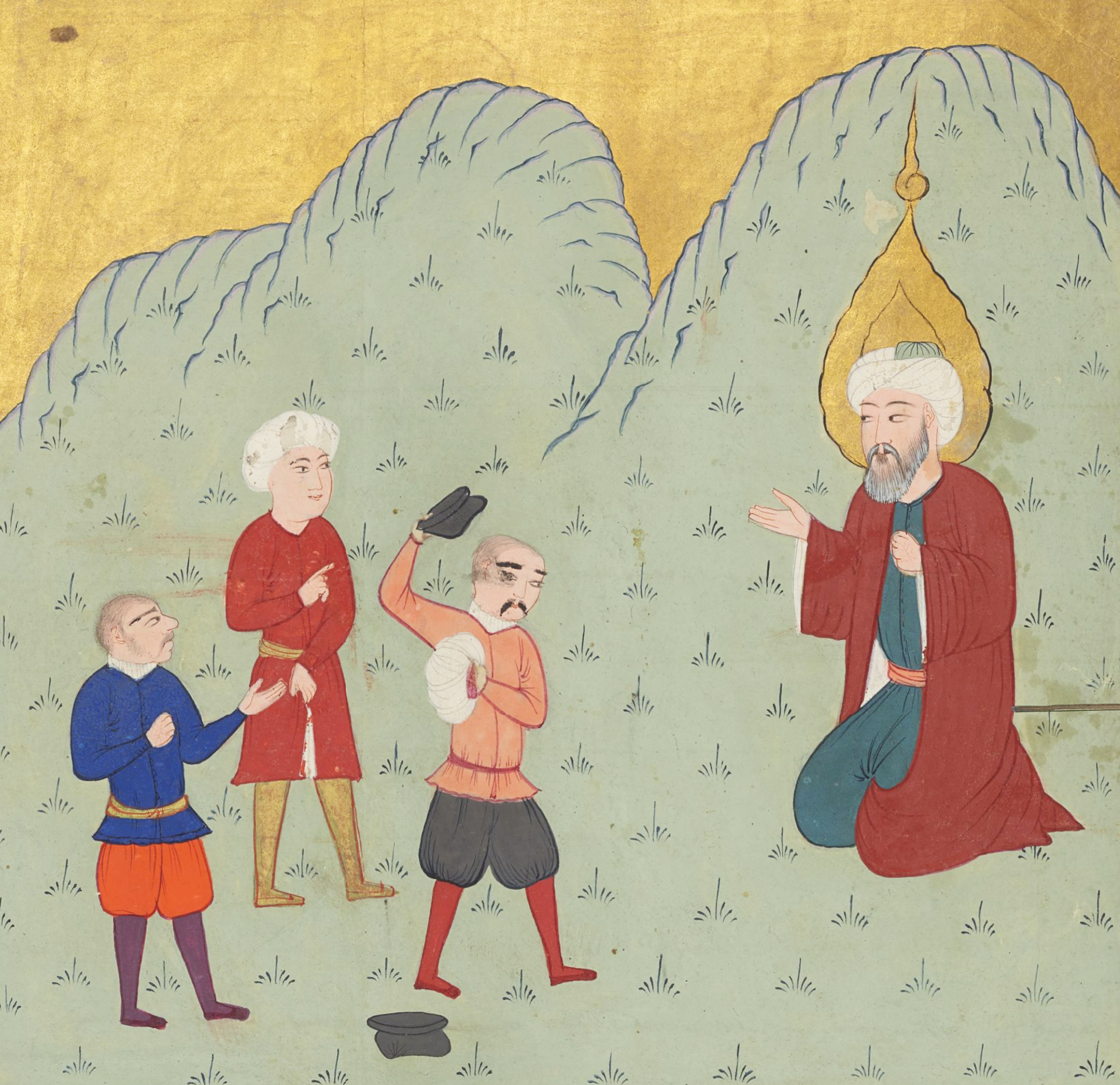
Islamic depiction of Alyasa (right) picking his prophetic successor

Elisha (Arabic: اليسع, romanized: al-yasaʿ) is venerated as a prophet in all of Islam, and is prophetic successor to Elijah (Arabic: Ilyās). Elisha is mentioned twice in the Quran as a prophet, alongside fellow prophets. According to the Quran, Elisha is exalted "above the worlds (or to their people)" (Arabic: فَضَّلْنَا عَلَى ٱلْعَالَمِين, romanized: faḍḍalnā ʿala l-ʿālamīn(a)) and is "among the excellent" (Arabic: مِنَ ٱلْأَخْيَار, romanized: mina l-akhyār(i)). Islamic sources that identify Elisha with Khidr cite the strong relationship between al-Khidr and Elijah in Islamic tradition. Around four thousand prophets were sent between Moses and Jesus, including figures such as Joshua, Elijah, Elisha, David, Solomon, Isaiah, Jeremiah, Jonah, and John the Baptist, who upheld the Torah and corrected deviations among the Israelites, with the finality of prophethood in Muhammad.

Some Muslims believe the tomb of Elisha is in Al-Awjam in the eastern region of Saudi Arabia. The shrine was removed by the Saudi Government because such veneration is not in accordance with the Wahhabi or Salafi reform movement dominant in Saudi Arabia. It had been an important landmark for many centuries during the time of Ottoman Arabia, and had been a very popular pilgrimage destination for Muslims of all sects throughout the pre-modern period.

== See also ==
- Tel Rehov
