= Obadiah (1 Kings) =

Character in 1 Kings in the Hebrew Bible

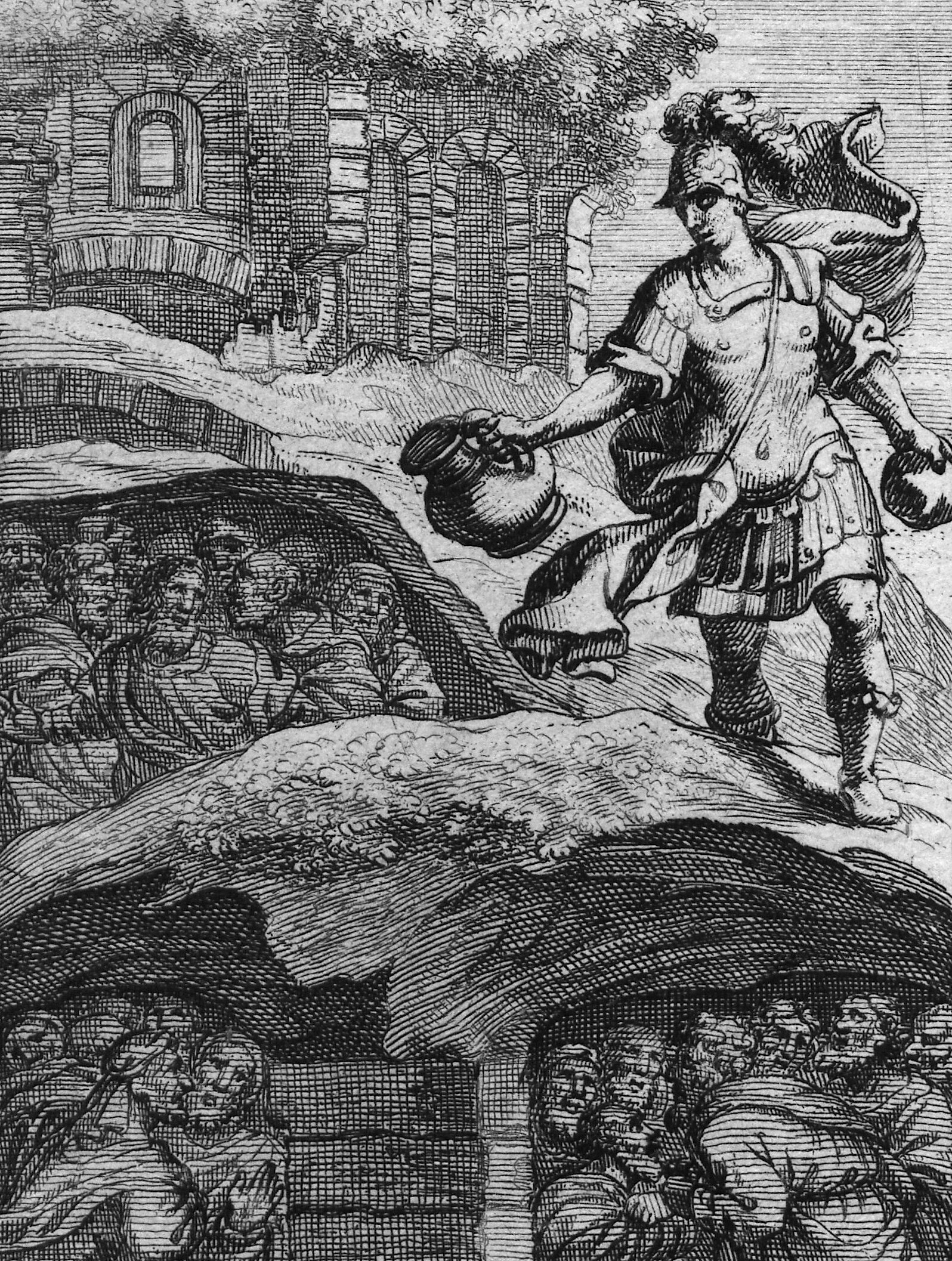
Woodcut of Obadiah hiding the prophets. Johann Christoph Weigel, 1695.

Obadiah is a character in 1 Kings in the Hebrew Bible. He was a majordomo in charge of Ahab's palace.

== Biblical Account ==
According to 1 Kings 18:4, Obadiah hid a hundred prophets of God in two caves, fifty in each, to protect them from Jezebel, Ahab's wife. Later statements of the prophet Elijah, where he describes himself as the only remaining prophet of Yahweh led biblical theologian Otto Thenius to conclude that eventually they were captured and killed, but George Rawlinson and other commentators argue that Elijah means he is the only active prophet because the others are in hiding.

While Ahab and Obadiah are surveying the land for relief from famine, Obadiah meets the elusive prophet Elijah, whom Ahab has been hunting. Elijah asks him to arrange a meeting with Ahab. Obadiah fears that while he goes to Ahab to announce that Elijah has requested a meeting, Elijah will disappear again and Ahab will kill Obadiah as a punishment. This was because every nation and kingdom was forced to make an oath with Ahab to officially declare that they were not lying whenever they failed to find Elijah's whereabouts. Obadiah was subject to these conditions as well. After being reassured by Elijah, Obadiah arranges the meeting.

Peter Leithart compares Obadiah to Elijah and notes that both are faithful servants of God, but that they "radically differ in their position and mode of service": whereas "Elijah confronts Ahab from outside the court", Obadiah works for the preservation of the prophets from within Ahab's court.

== Authorship of the Book of Obadiah ==
According to both rabbinic tradition and the tradition of the Eastern Orthodox Church, this Obadiah is the same person as the prophet who wrote the Book of Obadiah.
