= Genesis 35 =

Genesis 35 may refer to:

- Vayishlach, the Jewish parashah which covers this chapter from the Book of Genesis
- Jacob, whose later years are recorded in this chapter
