= Abel-meholah =

City mentioned in the Hebrew Bible

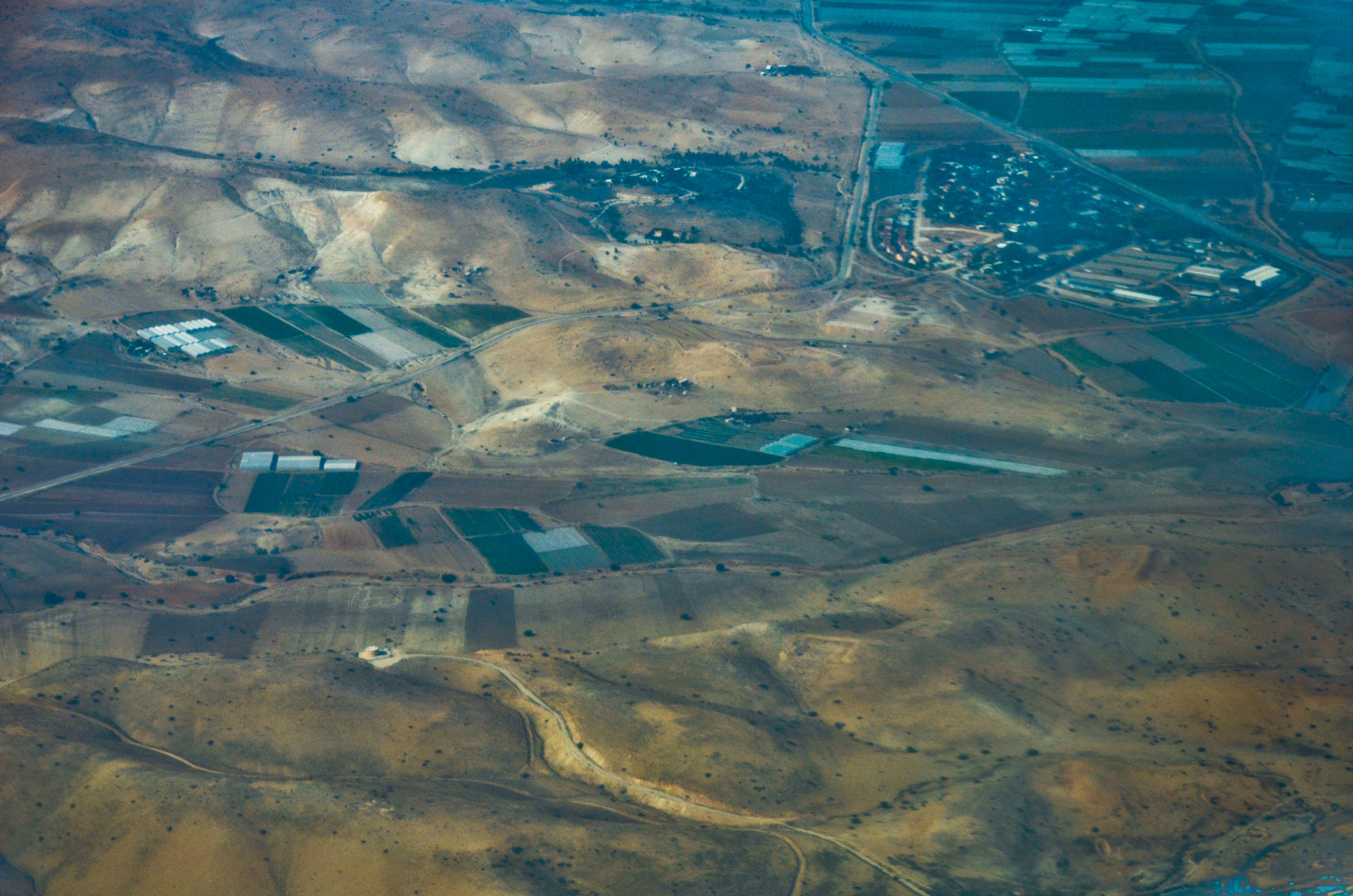
Jordan Valley around Wadi al-Malih. Abel-meholah is believed to have been located in that area

Abel-meholah (Hebrew: אָבֵל מְחוֹלָה, Avel Mehola) was an ancient city frequently mentioned in the Hebrew Bible (Old Testament of Christianity). It is best known for being the birthplace and residence of the prophet Elisha. It is traditionally located near the Jordan River, south of Beit-She'an.

== Mentions in the Bible ==
When Gideon defeated the Midianites, some of them fled "as far as the border of Abel-meholah" (Judges 7:22). The text indicates that Abel-meholah was seen as a region with a defined border, west of the Jordan River and south of Beit-She'an.

Abel-meholah is mentioned the Book of Kings under the description of King Solomon's administration. Among Solomon's twelve governors, there is one Baana who is put in charge of several districts including the area "from Beth-She'an to Abel-meholah" (1 Kings 4:12).

Later in the Book of Kings, Elijah, who had fled fearing Queen Jezebel's wrath, is ordered by God at Mount Horeb to go back along the Jordan valley and "anoint Elisha son of Shaphat from Abel-meholah" to succeed him as prophet (1 Kings 19:16).

Adriel the Meholathite, the son-in-law of King Saul, was probably named after Abel-meholah (1 Samuel 18:19, 2 Samuel 21:8).

== Location ==
The site of Abel-meholah has not yet been identified with certainty. Jerome and Eusebius refer to it as both a town and an area in the Jordan Valley, about ten Roman miles south of Bethshean. Epiphanius of Salamis, mentioning the village, writes that in his day it was called Beth-meholah.

In the late 19th century, explorers were trying to identify the exact mound. Conder stated with some confidence that the site "is now called 'Ain Helweh". Noth and Ottosson identified Abel-meholah with Tell Abu el-Kharaz, east of the Jordan River.

Modern scholars generally agree that it has to be found in that area and west of the Jordan River, probably at the spot where Wadi al-Malih, a stream which might preserve the ancient name Meholah, merges into the Jordan. Two tells in that general area, Tell Abu Sifri and Tell Abu Sus, are suitable candidates with the latter being more likely. Tell Abu Sifri is situated at the confluence of Wadi al-Helweh and Wadi al-Malih, while Tell Abu Sus is closer to the Jordan. Neither of the two have yet been excavated.

Two Israeli settlements in the area, Mehola and nearby Shadmot Mehola, are named after the biblical city.
