= Sarepta =

Former Phoenician city on the Mediterranean coast

- Location within Lebanon
- 33°27′27″N 35°17′45″E
- Location: Lebanon
- Region: South Governorate

Sarepta (near modern Sarafand, Lebanon) was a Phoenician city on the Mediterranean coast between Sidon and Tyre, also known biblically as Zarephath. It became a bishopric, which faded, and remains a double (Latin and Maronite) Catholic titular see.

Most of the objects by which Phoenician culture is characterised are those that have been recovered scattered among Phoenician colonies and trading posts; such carefully excavated colonial sites are in Spain, Sicily, Sardinia and Tunisia. The sites of many Phoenician cities, like Sidon and Tyre, by contrast, are still occupied, unavailable to archaeology except in highly restricted chance sites, usually much disturbed. Sarepta is the exception, the one Phoenician city in the heartland of the culture that has been unearthed and thoroughly studied.

== Mythology ==
In the poem Alexandra by Lycophron, Europa is called Saraptian (Σαραπτίαν). In his commentary, John Tzetzes explains that she is given this epithet because of the Phoenician city of Saraptia (Σαραπτία), which he also refers to as Sareptia (Σαρεπτία).

== History ==
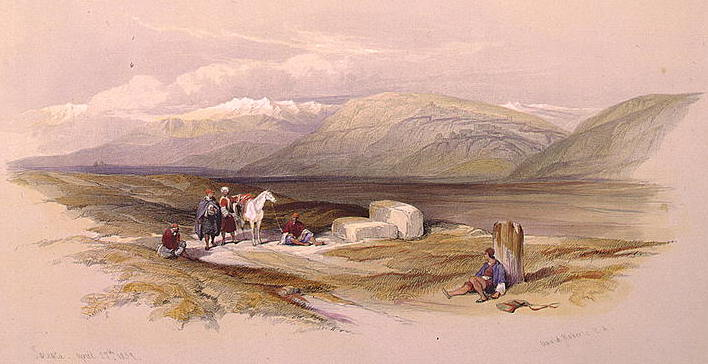
Sarepta in The Holy Land, Syria, Idumea, Arabia, Egypt, and Nubia

Sarepta is mentioned for the first time in the voyage of an ancient Egyptian in the 14th century BCE. Obadiah says it was the northern boundary of Canaan: “And the exiles of this host of the sons of Israel who are among the Canaanites as far as Zarephath (צרפת), and the exiles of Jerusalem who are in Sepharad, will possess the cities of the south.” The medieval lexicographer David ben Abraham al-Fasi identified Zarephath with the city of Ṣarfanda (Judeo-Arabic: צרפנדה). Originally Sidonian, the town passed to the Tyrians after the invasion of Shalmaneser IV, 722 BCE. It fell to Sennacherib in 701 BCE.

1 Kings 17:8-24 describes the city as being subject to Sidon in the time of Ahab and says that the prophet Elijah, after leaving the wadi Kerith (Hebrew: נַחַל כְּרִית, romanized: naḥal Kəriṯ, multiplied the meal and oil of the widow of Zarephath and resurrected her son, an incident also referred to by Jesus in Luke 4:26.

In the mid-4th-century BC Periplus of Pseudo-Scylax, the city is called Sarapta (Σάραπτα) and is described as belonging to the Tyrians. This name is also attested in the work of the 6th-century AD Stephanus of Byzantium.

Zarephath (צרפת ṣārĕfáṯ) became the eponym in Hebrew for any smelter or forge, or metalworking shop. In the 1st century, the Roman port of Sarepta about 1 km (0.62 mi) to the south, is mentioned by Josephus and by Pliny the Elder.

It appears in a list of valuable gifts sent by Emperor Gallienus, where "four handkerchiefs from Sarepta" are included alongside other high-value items such as embroidered garments, purple-bordered cloaks and other luxury textiles.

In the Expositio totius mundi et gentium, Sarepta is described as a prosperous coastal city associated with the production of luxury textiles, particularly purple dye and is situated within a broader region noted for its linen production and commercial prosperity.

Sarepta is the location of a Shi'i shrine to Abu Dharr al-Ghifari, a companion of Muhammad. The shrine is believed to have been built several centuries after Abu Dharr's death.

After the Islamization of the area, in 1185, the Byzantine monk Phocas, making a gazetteer of the Holy Land (De locis sanctis, 7), found the town almost in its ancient condition. A century later, according to Burchard of Mount Sion, it was in ruins and contained only seven or eight houses. Even after the Crusader states had collapsed, the Catholic Church continued to appoint purely titular bishops of Sarepta, the most noted being Thomas, the auxiliary Bishop of Wrocław, who held the post from 1350 until 1378.

== Ecclesiastical history ==
Sarepta as a Christian city was mentioned in the Itinerarium Burdigalense; the Onomasticon of Eusebius and in Jerome; by Theodosius and Pseudo-Antoninus who, in the 6th century call it a small town but very Christian. It contained at that time a church dedicated to Elijah. The Notitiae Episcopatuum, a list of bishoprics made in Antioch in the 6th century, speaks of Sarepta as a suffragan see of Tyre; all of its bishops are unknown.

=== Titular sees ===
The diocese was nominally restored as titular see, twice: in Latin and Maronite traditions.

==== Sarepta of the Maronites ====
This titular bishopric was established in 1983.

It has had the following incumbents of the fitting episcopal (lowest) rank:

- Emile Eid (1982.12.20 – death 2009.11.30), in the Roman Curia: Vice-President of Pontifical Commission for the Revision of Code of Oriental Canon Law (1982.12.20 – 1990.10.18) and on emeritate; previously Defender of the Bond of Supreme Tribunal of the Apostolic Signatura (1969? – 1974), Promoter of Justice of the same Supreme Tribunal of the Apostolic Signatura (1969 – 1980)
- Hanna G. Alwan, Congregation of the Lebanese Maronite Missionaries (L.M.) (2011.08.13 – ...), Bishop of Curia of the Maronites at the Patriarchate of Antioc; previously Prelate Auditor of Tribunal of the Roman Rota (1996.03.04 – 2011.08.13).

==== Sarepta of the Romans ====
It was established as titular bishopric no later than the 15th century. It has been vacant for decades, having had the following incumbents:

- Theodorich, (around 1350), as Auxiliary Bishop of Roman Catholic Diocese of Olomouc (Moravia)
- Jaroslav of Bezmíře, appointed Bishop of Sarepta on 1394.7.15 by Pope Boniface IX
- Guillaume Vasseur, Dominican Order (O.P.) (1448.10.23 – death 1476?), no actual prelature
- Gilles Barbier, Friars Minor (O.F.M.) (1476.04.03 – death 1494.03.28) as Auxiliary Bishop of Diocese of Tournai (Belgium) (1476.04.03 – 1494.03.28)
- Nicolas Bureau, O.F.M. (1519.12.02 – death 1551) as Auxiliary Bishop of Diocese of Tournai (Belgium) (1519.12.02 – 1551)
- Guillaume Hanwere (1552.04.27 – 1560) as Auxiliary Bishop of above Tournai (Belgium) (1552.04.27 – 1560)
- Johannes Kaspar Stredele 'Austrian) (1631.12.15 – death 1642.12.28) as Auxiliary Bishop of Diocese of Passau (Bavaria, Germany) (1631.12.15 – 1642.12.28)
- Wojciech Ignacy Bardziński (1709.01.28 – death 1722?) as Auxiliary Bishop of Diocese of Kujawy–Pomorze (Poland) (1709.01.28 – 1722?)
- Charles Antoine de La Roche-Aymon (1725.06.11 – 1730.10.02) as Auxiliary Bishop of Diocese of Limoges (France) (1725.06.11 – 1730.10.02); later Bishop of Tarbes (France) ([1729.12.27] 1730.10.02 – 1740.11.11), Metropolitan Archbishop of Toulouse (France) ([1740.01.10] 1740.11.11 – 1752.12.18), Metropolitan Archbishop of Narbonne (France) ([1752.10.02] 1752.12.18 – 1763.01.24), Metropolitan Archbishop of Reims (France) ([1762.12.05] 1763.01.24 – death 1777.10.27), created Cardinal-Priest with no Title assigned (1771.12.16 – 1777.10.27)
- Johann Anton Wallreuther (1731.03.05 – 1734.01.16) as Auxiliary Bishop of Diocese of Worms (Germany) (1731.03.05 – 1734.01.16)
- Jean de Cairol de Madaillan (1760.01.28 – 1770.01.29) as Auxiliary Bishop of Archdiocese of Narbonne (France) (1760.01.28 – ?); later Bishop of Vence (France) (1770.01.29 – 1771.12.16), Bishop of Grenoble (France) (1771.12.16 [1772.01.23] – 1779.12.10)
- Jean-Denis de Vienne (1775.12.18 – death 1800) as Auxiliary Bishop of Lyon (France) (1775.12.18 – 1800)
- Alois Josef Krakovský z Kolovrat (1800.12.22 – 1815.03.15) as Auxiliary Bishop of Archdiocese of Olomouc (Olomütz, Moravia, now Czech Republic) (1800.12.22 – 1815.03.15), Bishop of Hradec Králové (now Czech Republic) (1815.03.15 – 1831.02.28), Metropolitan Archbishop of Archdiocese of Praha (Prague, Bohemia, now Czech Republic) (1831.02.28 – death 1833.03.28)
- Johann Heinrich Milz (1825.12.19 – death 1833.04.29) as Auxiliary Bishop of Trier (Germany) (1825.12.19 – 1833.04.29)
- Johann Stanislaus Kutowski (1836.02.01 – death 1848.12.29) as Auxiliary Bishop of Diocese of Chełmno (Kulm, Poland) (1836.02.01 – 1848.12.29)
- Franz Xaver Zenner (1851.02.17 – death 1861.10.29) as Auxiliary Bishop of Archdiocese of Wien (Vienna, Austria) (1851.02.17 – 1861.10.29)
- Nicholas Power (1865.04.30 – death 1871.04.05) as Coadjutor Bishop of Killaloe (Ireland) (1865.04.30 – 1871.04.05)
- Jean-François Jamot (1874.02.03 – 1882.07.11) as only Apostolic Vicar of Northern Canada (Canada) (1874.02.03 – 1882.07.11); next (see) promoted first Bishop of Peterborough (Canada) (1882.07.11 – death 1886.05.04)
- Antonio Scotti (1882.09.25 – 1886.01.15) as Auxiliary Bishop of Archdiocese of Benevento (Italy) (1882.09.25 – 1886.01.15); next Bishop of Alife (Italy) (1886.01.15 – retired 1898.03.24), emeritate as Titular Bishop of Tiberiopolis (1898.03.24 – death 1919.06.10)
- Paulus Palásthy (1886.05.04 – death 1899.09.24) as Auxiliary Bishop of Archdiocese of Esztergom (Hungary) (1886.05.04 – 1899.09.24)
- Filippo Genovese (Italian) (1900.12.17 – death 1902.12.16), no actual prelature
- Joseph Müller (1903.04.30 – death 1921.03.21) as Auxiliary Bishop of Archdiocese of Köln (Cologne, Germany) (1903.04.30 – 1921.03.21)
- Edward Doorly (1923.04.05 – 1926.07.17) as Coadjutor Bishop of Elphin (Ireland) (1923.04.05 – succession 1926.07.17); next Bishop of Elphin (1926.07.17 – 1950.04.05)
- Petar Dujam Munzani (1926.08.13 – 1933.03.16) as Apostolic Administrator of Archdiocese of Zadar (Croatia) (1926.08.13 – succession 1933.03.16); later Archbishop of Zadar (Croatia) (1933.03.16 – retired 1948.12.11), emeritate as Titular Archbishop of Tyana (1948.12.11 – death 1951.01.28)
- François-Louis Auvity (1933.06.02 – 1937.08.14) as Auxiliary Bishop of Archdiocese of Bourges (France) (1933.06.02 – 1937.08.14); later Bishop of Mende (France) (1937.08.14 – retired 1945.09.11), emeritate as Titular Bishop of Dionysiana (1945.09.11 – death 1964.02.15)
- Francesco Canessa (1937.09.04 – 1948.01.14)
- John Francis Dearden (later Cardinal) (1948.03.13 – 1950.12.22)
- Athanasios Cheriyan Polachirakal (1953.12.31 – 1955.01.27)
- Luis Andrade Valderrama, Friars Minor (O.F.M.) (1955.03.09 – 1977.06.29)

== Madaba Map ==
The city appears on the Madaba Map as Sarephtha (Σαρεφθά), accompanied by the inscription "Σαρεφθὰ ἡ Μακρὰ Κώμη ὅπου τέκνον ἠγέρθη ἐν τῇ ἡμέρᾳ ἐκείνῃ" (Sarephtha, the long village, where the child was raised on that day), an allusion to the biblical miracle in which Elijah restored to life the son of the widow of Zarephath.

== Archaeology ==
A Heavy Neolithic archaeological site of the Qaraoun culture that pre-dated Sarepta by several thousand years was discovered at Sarafand by Hajji Khalaf. He made a collection of material and passed it to the National Museum of Beirut. It consisted of an assemblage of large flakes and bifaces in Eocene flint. Some piebald flint blades were also found along with hammerstones in Nummulitic limestone that resemble finds from Aadloun II (Bezez Cave), which is located 1 kilometre (0.62 mi) to the South. Khalaf also found a well-made adze and a narrow, slightly polished chisel. A collection in the National Museum of Beirut marked "Jezzine ou Sarepta" consisted of around twelve neatly made discoid- and tortoise-cores in cherty flint of a cream colour with a tinge of red.

The low tell on the seashore was excavated by James B. Pritchard over five years from 1969 to 1974. Civil war in Lebanon put an end to the excavations.

The site of the ancient town is marked by the ruins on the shore to the south of the modern village, about eight miles to the south of Sidon, which extend along the shore for a mile or more. They are in two distinct groups, one on a headland to the west of a fountain called ‛Ain el-Ḳantara, which is not far from the shore. Here was the ancient harbor which still affords shelter for small craft. The other group of ruins, to the south, consists of columns, sarcophagi and marble slabs, indicating a city of considerable importance.

Pritchard's excavations revealed many artifacts of daily life in the ancient Phoenician city of Sarepta: pottery workshops and kilns, artifacts of daily use and religious figurines, numerous inscriptions that included some in Ugaritic. Pillar worship is traceable from an 8th-century shrine of Tanit-Ashtart, and a seal with the city's name made the identification secure. The local Bronze Age-Iron Age stratigraphy was established in detail; absolute dating depends in part on correlations with Cypriote and Aegean stratigraphy.

The climax of the Sarepta discoveries at Sarafand is the cult shrine of "Tanit/Astart", who is identified in the site by an inscribed votive ivory plaque, the first identification of Tanit in her homeland. The site revealed figurines, further carved ivories, amulets and a cultic mask.

During the 2024 Israeli invasion of Lebanon, UNESCO gave enhanced protection to 34 cultural sites in Lebanon including the Sarepta archaeological site to safeguard it from damage.

== Other uses of the name ==
In Hebrew after the Diaspora, the name צרפת, ts-r-f-t, Tsarfat (Zarephath) is used to mean France, perhaps because the Hebrew letters ts-r-f, if reversed, become f-r-ts. That usage is retained in daily use in contemporary Hebrew.

== See also ==
- Cities of the ancient Near East
- List of Catholic dioceses in Lebanon

== Sources ==
- Pritchard, James B. Recovering Sarepta, a Phoenician City: Excavations at Sarafund, 1969-1974, University Museum of the University of Pennsylvania (Princeton: Princeton University Press) 1978, ISBN 0-691-09378-4
- William P. Anderson, Sarepta I: The late bronze and Iron Age strata of area II.Y : the University Museum of the University of Pennsylvania excavations at Sarafand, Lebanon (Publications de l'Universite libanaise), Département des publications de l'Universite Libanaise, 1988
- Issam A. Khalifeh, Sarepta II: The Late Bronze and Iron Age Periods of Area Ii.X, University Museum of the University of Pennsylvania, 1988, ISBN 99943-751-5-6
- Robert Koehl, Sarepta III: the Imported Bronze & Iron Age, University Museum of the University of Pennsylvania, 1985, ISBN 99943-751-7-2
- James B. Pritchard, Sarepta IV: The Objects from Area Ii.X, University Museum of the University of Pennsylvania, 1988, ISBN 99943-751-9-9
- Lloyd W. Daly, A Greek-Syllabic Cypriot Inscription from Sarafand, Zeitschrift für Papyrologie und Epigraphik, Bd. 40, pp. 223–225, 1980
- Dimitri Baramki, A Late Bronze Age tomb at Sarafend, ancient Sarepta, Berytus, vol. 12, pp. 129–42, 1959
- Charles Cutler Torrey, The Exiled God of Sarepta, Berytus, vol. 9, pp. 45–49, 1949
