= Cherith =

Cherith is a feminine given name. Notable people with the name include:

- Cherith Baldry (born 1947), British children's author
- Cherith Norman Chalet, American diplomat
- Cherith McKinstry (1928−2004), Irish painter and sculptor

== See also ==
- Chorath (also spelled Cherith), a stream named in the Hebrew Bible
