= Atarah (name) =

Atarah or Atara (Hebrew: עֲטָרָה) is a Hebrew feminine given name meaning 'crown'. In the Tanakh, it is the name of a wife of Jerahmeel. It has been used as a translation of the Yiddish name Kreine.

== People with the given name Atarah or Atara ==
- Atara Barzely, Miss Israel of 1957
- Atarah Ben-Tovim, British flautist
- Atara Marmor, French historian
- Atara Polonsky, Israeli athlete
- Atara Ofek, Israeli writer
- Atara Oryah, Israeli singer
