= Ancient Diocese of Alais =

Roman Catholic diocese in France (1694–1801)

Coordinates: 44.1235°N 4.0763°E

This is not the diocese of Ales-Terralba in Italy, nor the Ancient Diocese of Alet in south-west France

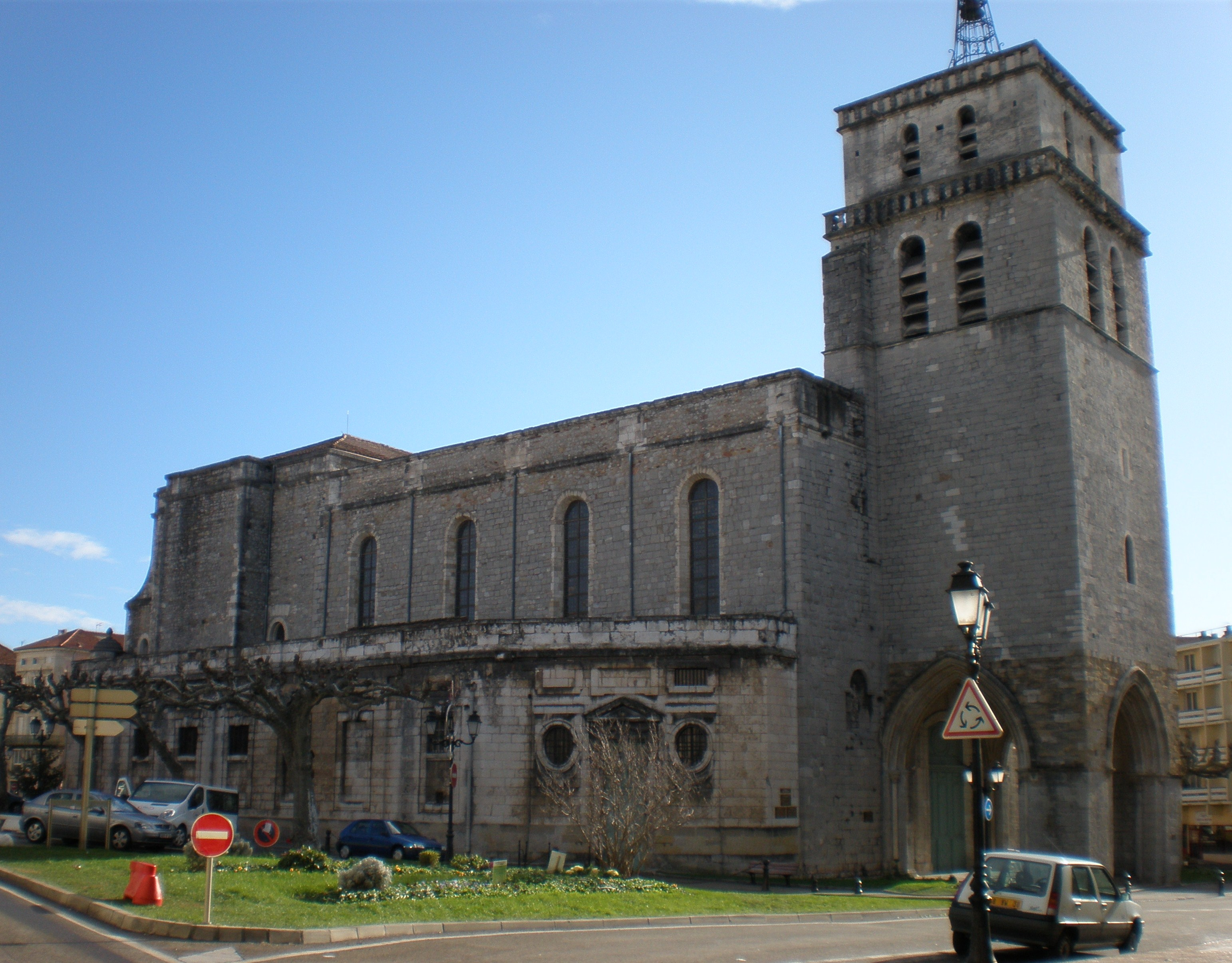
Alès Cathedral

The former French Catholic diocese of Alais (now written Alès, and in Latin: Alesiensis) was created in 1694, out of territory previously part of the diocese of Nîmes. It was suppressed after the French Revolution, with its territory being divided between the diocese of Avignon and the diocese of Mende. Its seat was Alès Cathedral.

== History ==
=== Arisitum ===
About 570, Sigebert, King of Austrasia, created a see at Arisitum for a bishop named Monderic, taking fifteen parishes to create a territory for him. Monderic had originally been consecrated as a coadjutor for Bishop Tetricus of Langres, who had suffered a stroke. The understanding, however, was that he would serve as Archpriest of Tonnerre in the diocese of Langres, until Bishop Tetricus died. But in the war between King Guntram and King Sigibert, Monderic had given gifts and furnished supplies for Sigibert, and so he was sent into exile super ripam Rhodani in turri quadam arcta atque detecta, ('by the bank of the Rhone in a certain small tower that had lost its roof') in which he was held for two years cum grandi cruciatu ('with great discomfort'). Archbishop Nicetius, who was the bishop of Lyon and Metropolitan of the diocese of Langres, intervened on his behalf and sheltered him in Lyon for two months. Unable to get his original place restored, Monderic fled to King Sigibert, who assigned him the fifteen parishes and the village of Arisitum, which had once belonged to the Goths but at the time was in the diocese Bishop Dalmatius of Rodez. When Bishop Tetricus of Langres died, Gregory of Tours' kinsman Silvester was chosen to succeed him, and he proceeded to Lyon for consecration. The identification of Alais with 'Arisitum' was argued by Auguste Longnon, on very slender evidence. There are several other possibilities, as Louis Duchesne notes. The geography seems better suited to Neustrasia and to Aquitaine rather than to the lower parts of the Rhone valley.

A Bishop of Arisitum named Emmo is said to have participated in the Council of Clichy in 627, but neither the name Emmo nor the diocese Arisitum appear in the subscription list of that Council. His name does appear as a participant in a synod held at Reims, but only in Flodoard's Historia ecclesiae Remensis. This synod is not dated, and its acts quoted by Flodoard, do not appear in collections of church councils and synods. Louis Duchesne has noticed that the acts quoted by Flodoard are actually borrowed from the Council of Clichy in 627.

It is surmised that, in the eighth century, when Septimania was annexed to the Frankish Empire, the Diocese of Alais was suppressed and its territory returned to the Diocese of Nîmes. It is also stated that the diocese was handed over to the diocese of Metz.

=== Alais ===
Huguenot control (purple) and influence (violet), 16th century

After the Edict of Nantes, Alais was one of the places de sûreté given to the Huguenots. In 1620 a national assembly of the Protestant churches of France was held at Alais. In 1623 Alais joined the side of the Duc de Rohan, and strengthened the fortifications of the town. Louis XIII took back the town on 17 June 1629, after a nine-day siege, and the Convention of Alais, was signed on 29 June of that year with Rohan and Soubise, which suppressed the political privileges of the Protestants. On 17 October 1685, Louis XIV issued the Edict of Fontainebleau, revoking the Edict of Nantes and ordering the closing of Huguenot churches and schools. Parliament ratified the decree on 22 October. In 1689 the King ordered his military architect Vauban to reconstruct the fortress of Alais, which had been destroyed on orders of Louis XIII.

At the request of Louis XIV, a see was created at Alais by Pope Innocent XII, on 16 May 1694, in a bull entitled Animarum Zelus. The bull specifically states that a major motive of King Louis was the rooting out of heresy. The King had nominated François de Saulx as the first bishop of Alais as early as August 1687, but the diplomatic rupture between the Papacy and France, due to the Gallican Articles of 1682 and the seizure of Avignon on 29 September 1688, made it impossible for French nominees to obtain their bulls from Rome as long as Pope Innocent XI lived. Innocent's successor, Pope Alexander VIII (1689–1691) followed the same policy as far as bishops who had cooperated with the creation of the Gallican Articles was concerned. It was only in 1693 that Louis XIV rescinded the Four Articles and made his formal retraction in a letter to the Pope. In June 1694 he gave his formal consent to the creation of the diocese of Alais, and ordered the Parliament of Toulouse to register his decree.

The new diocese of Alais was to be composed of ninety parishes, divided into seven deaneries, each headed by an Archpriest: Alais, Anduse, La Salle, S. Hippolyte, Sumène, Vigan, and Mayrueis. There were five religious houses, of both sexes. There was a foundation of Benedictine monks at Nôtre-Dame de Sendras (Cendras), and another at Saint-Pierre de-Salve (Sauve). A convent of Cistercian nuns was established at the monastery of Nôtre-Dame de Font-aux-Nonnains, north of Alais in the village of Saint-Julien-les-Valgagues.

A new cathedral was needed for the new diocese. The Collegiate Church (Basilica) of Saint John the Baptist was chosen. It already had a staff of ten Canons, led by a Dean and a Sacristan. This was not a sufficient number, however, for the dignity of a cathedral. A union with the Canons of the secular abbey of Aigues-Mortes, which had three dignities and fifteen Canons, was therefore negotiated; the Dean of Aigues-Mortes would become the Dean of Alais, but he would immediately resign, and the office of Dean would be abolished. The new Cathedral of Saint John the Baptist had a Chapter consisting of five dignities (Provost, Grand Archdeacon of Alais, the Archdeacon, the Cantor, Sacristan and Succentor) and eighteen Canons (eight from Alais and ten from Aigues-Mortes).

In 1721 a pestilence, carried north from Marseille, struck Alais, and afflicted the population for more than a year. Bishop Charles de Bannes d'Avéjan, who happened to be in Paris, procured aid from the King and took measures in the town against disease.

In 1724 Bishop d'Avéjan presided over the founding of the Collège d'Alais (a high school).

In 1727 Bishop d'Avéjan established a 'refuge' for retired prostitutes in Alais, directed by the religious of the Order of Notre-Dame du Refuge.

Bishop d'Avéjan's sister, Anne-Elisabeth de Banne d'Avéjan, was Abbess of Alais (Nôtre-Dame de Font-aux-Nonnains). She died on 11 November 1774, in her 95th year.

The future Cardinal de Bausset, the biographer of François de Salignac de la Mothe-Fénelon (1810), of Cardinal Alexandre-Angélique de Talleyrand (1821), and of Jacques-Bénigne Bossuet (1819–1824), was Bishop of Alais from 1784 to 1790.

In 1790 the National Constituent Assembly decided to bring the French church under the control of the State. Civil government of the provinces was to be reorganized into new units called 'départements', originally intended to be 83 or 84 in number. The dioceses of the Roman Catholic Church were to be reduced in number, to coincide as much as possible with the new departments. Since there were more than 130 bishoprics at the time of the Revolution, more than fifty dioceses needed to be suppressed and their territories consolidated. Clergy would need to take an oath of allegiance to the State and its Constitution, specified by the Civil Constitution of the Clergy, and they would become salaried officials of the State. Both bishops and priests would be elected by special 'electors' in each department. This meant schism, since bishops would no longer need to be approved (preconised) by the Papacy; the transfer of bishops, likewise, which had formerly been the exclusive prerogative of the pope in canon law, would be the privilege of the State; the election of bishops no longer lay with the Cathedral Chapters (which were all abolished), or other responsible clergy, or the Pope, but with electors who did not even have to be Catholics or Christians. The diocese of Alais was one of the dioceses which was suppressed, and its territory was transferred to a new diocese centered at Nîmes, and called the 'Diocèse du Gard'. Bishop Louis-François de Bausset no longer had a diocese, and he had a competitor in the form of the new 'Constitutional Bishop' of Gard, Jean Baptiste Dumouchel, Rector of the University of Paris.

After the signing of the Concordat of 1801 with First Consul Napoleon Bonaparte, the diocese of Alais was not revived, but abolished by Pope Pius VII in his bull Qui Christi Domini of 29 November 1801.

== Bishops ==
- 17 May 1694 – Oct 1712 : François Chevalier de Saulx
- 28 Apr 1713 – 27 May 1720 : Louis François-Gabriel de Henin-Liétard
- 16 Jun 1721 – 23 May 1744 : Charles de Bannes d'Avéjan
- 18 Dec 1744 – 21 July 1755 : Louis-François de Vivet de Montclus
- 16 Feb 1756 – 25 Mar 1776 : Jean-Louis du Buisson de Beauteville
- 20 May 1776 – 20 Jun 1784 : Pierre-Marie-Madeleine Cortois de Balore
- 25 Jun 1784 - 1791/1801 : Louis-François de Bausset

== See also ==
- Catholic Church in France
- List of Catholic dioceses in France

== Bibliography ==
=== Reference works ===
- Gams, Pius Bonifatius (1873). Series episcoporum Ecclesiae catholicae: quotquot innotuerunt a beato Petro apostolo. Ratisbon: Typis et Sumptibus Georgii Josephi Manz., p. 483. (Use with caution; obsolete)
- Gauchat, Patritius (Patrice) (1935). Hierarchia catholica IV (1592-1667). Münster: Libraria Regensbergiana.
- Ritzler, Remigius; Sefrin, Pirminus (1952). Hierarchia catholica medii et recentis aevi V (1667-1730). Patavii: Messagero di S. Antonio.
- Ritzler, Remigius; Sefrin, Pirminus (1958). Hierarchia catholica medii et recentis aevi VI (1730-1799). Patavii: Messagero di S. Antonio.

=== Studies ===
- Anonymous (1815). Notes sur Alais ancien (in French).
- Benedictines of Saint-Maur, ed. (1739). Gallia Christiana, In Provincias Ecclesiasticas Distributa (in Latin). Vol. Tomus Sextus (6). Paris: Ex Typographia Regia.
- Du Tems, Hugues (1774). Le clergé de France, ou tableau historique et chronologique des archevêques, évêques, abbés, abbesses et chefs des chapitres principaux du royaume, depuis la fondation des églises jusqu'à nos jours (in French). Vol. Tome premier. Paris: Delalain.
- Jean, Armand (1891). Les évêques et les archevêques de France depuis 1682 jusqu'à 1801 (in French). Paris: A. Picard.
- Recueil administratif de la ville d'Alais (in French). Alais: Martin. 1858.
