= Alès Cathedral =

Cathedral in Alès, France

Coordinates: 44°7′25″N 4°4′36″E

Alès Cathedral Cathédrale Saint-Jean-Baptiste d'Alès
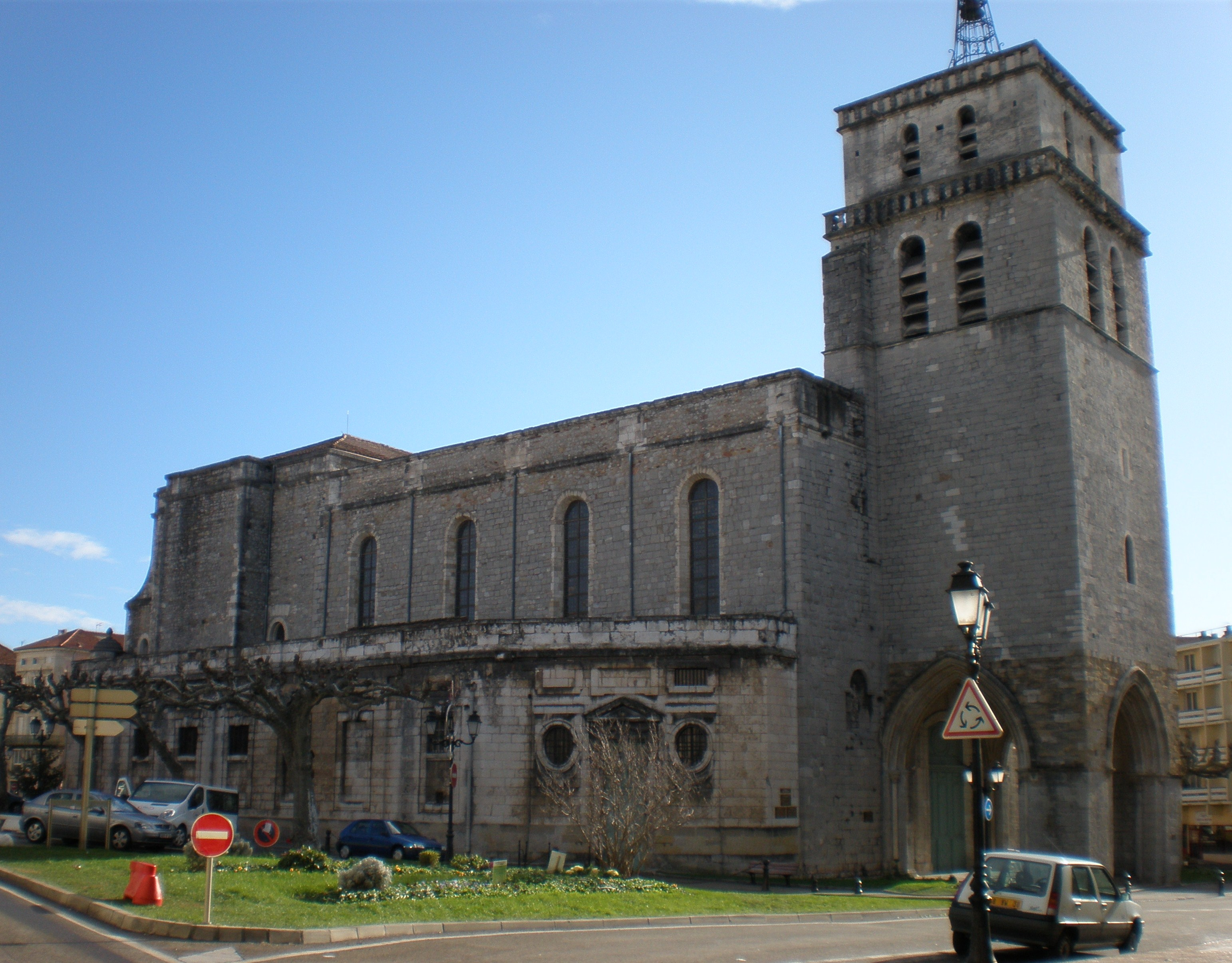
- Alès Cathedral

Religion
- Affiliation: Roman Catholic Church
- Province: Diocese of Alès
- Region: Gard
- Rite: Roman
- Ecclesiastical or organisational status: Cathedral
- Status: Active

Location
- Location: Alès, France
- Interactive map of Alès Cathedral; Cathédrale Saint-Jean-Baptiste d'Alès

Architecture
- Type: church
- Groundbreaking: 17th century

Alès Cathedral (French: Cathédrale Saint-Jean-Baptiste d'Alès) is a Roman Catholic church dedicated to Saint John the Baptist and located in the town of Alès in the department of Gard, France. It has been a monument historique since 9 May 1914.

Alès was formerly a centre of the Huguenots and was taken only after a long siege by Louis XIII in 1627. The Roman Catholic Diocese of Alès was established here in 1694, at which time the construction of the cathedral began, but was not restored after the French Revolution: by the Concordat of 1801 its parishes were divided between the dioceses of Avignon and Mende.

Alès and its cathedral lie near the start of The Regordane Way, or St. Gilles Trail, an ancient road and medieval pilgrimage route.

== Sources ==
- Cathédrale Saint Jean Baptiste - 30100 ALES
