= Château de Vissec =

Castle in Gard, Occitania, France

Coordinates: 43°54′N 3°28′E

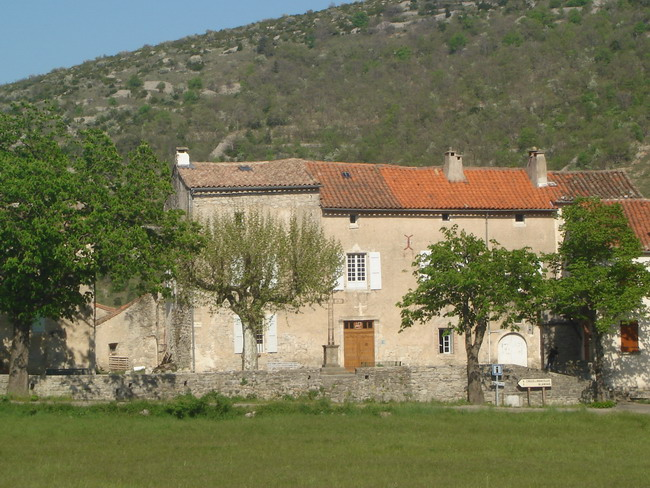
The Château de Vissec

The Château de Vissec is a castle located in the commune of Vissec in the Gard département of France.

== History ==
The House of Vissec was one of the most ancient and greatest of Languedoc. It owed its origin to lands and a castle of the same name in the dioceses of Lodève and Alais. The former Lords of Vissec added to the titles of their land, the quality of powerful Lords. This title was worn by three bishops in the 14th century and was especially illustrated by the family Vissec de Latude.

On November 2, 1570, Jacques de Montfaucon, Lord of Vissec, presiding over the court of the helps of Montpellier, became First Consul and attended the general States of the province in Beaucaire.

Vissec depended on the barony of Hierle.

On August 27, 1628, Henri, duc de Rohan, ordered Fulcran II d' Assas to raze the castle to the ground with the houses of the village of Vissec and the mill of Foux. In September, learning that the destruction achieved nothing, he ordered the viguerie in Vigan to send a carrier with 60 soldiers and 120 pioneers and masons. On December 22, 1628, the carrier demanded the payment of all the expenses of his troop who stayed in Vissec until the total demolition. If the ramparts and defensive points were given up, Christophe de Montfaucon, baron of Vissec, baron of Hierle could have lived again in what buildings remained.

Pierre de Montfaucon had the fortress repaired by 1646.

On July 22, 1654, Pierre de Montfaucon and his band were condemned to death for all their crimes (murders, rapes, plunders). On September 15, 1655, the razing of the fortifications of Vissec was added to this condemnation, and the filling of ditches. The dismantling took place from 26 to 28 June 1656, but Pierre de Montfaucon escaped. He was arrested in 1660 and imprisoned in the apartment house in Paris. In 1668, he was released thanks to the intervention of the Prince of Conti, Louis Armand Ier de Bourbon-Conti.

Blason du marquis de Vissec

Anne-Jacquette du Faur de Pibrac, the second wife of Pierre managed Vissec for her husband and then for her son Michel. Michel de Montfaucon, marquess of Vissec, baron of Hierle lived in Vigan, but also stayed at Vissec, in the part of the feudal castle, reorganised as a manor house by his mother.

With the death of Anne de Crouzet, widow of Michel Marc Antoine Caesar de Montfaucon, in 1762, Jean de la Tour du Pin de Gouvernet, a remote relative of the deceased, inherited the possessions and titles of Vissec.

In 1792, the possessions belonging to Alexandre-César de la Tour du Pin, marquess of Vissec became national property. The castle was plundered, removing any trace of blazons, kicking down doors, as well as the parquets of the first floor. Lots were established for the sale of the domain. Jean-Jacques Capion, solicitor in Vigan, bought them all except one, which exclusively consisted of lands and was bought by the inhabitants of Vissec.

On October 7, 1862, Louis-Eugène Capion, owner of Vigan, sold to Joseph Bourrier, owner to Roquenouze, municipality of Vissec, a small domain situated in Vissec including a house with a stable and dependences, according to in the bill of sale, previously called the castle, a small independent stable, the ruins of the former castle, a ploughable land below the road face to face of the house known indicated an adjacent vineyard, a field of mulberry trees and pear trees in the ground of Peyssel, in brief all the lands which the salesman possessed in the municipality of Vissec but nevertheless independent of the domain of Roquenouze.

== Castle owners ==
- from 1668 to 1762: the Montfaucons, baron then marquis de Vissec.
- from 1762 to 1792: the Latour du Pins, marquis de Vissec.
- from 1792 to 1862: the Capions.
- from 1862 to today: the Bourriers.

== See also ==
- List of castles in France
