= François-Louis Auvity =

Catholic bishop and Nazi supporter

- Bishop of Mende, then Titular Bishop of Dionysiana
- Photograph of Auvity from La Croix (1937)
- Church: Catholic Church
- Installed: 1937 (as bishop of Mende)
- Term ended: 1944 (as bishop of Mende)
- Predecessor: Jules-Alexandre Cusin
- Successor: Maurice Rousseau

Orders
- Ordination: May 1899
- Consecration: August 1937 by Eugenio Pacelli (later Pope Pius XII)

Personal details
- Born: 9 January 1874 Germigny-l'Exempt, France
- Died: 15 February 1964 (aged 90) Germigny-l'Exempt, France

François-Louis Auvity (9 January 1874 – 15 February 1964), bishop of Mende (1937–1944), was one of seven French Roman Catholic bishops who were obliged to submit their resignations to Pope Pius XII in the aftermath of the Liberation of France after the German occupation during the Second World War because of their enthusiastic collaboration with the occupation of France by Germany.

Auvity was ordained priest in May 1899. Between then and 1924 he was a professor of apologétique (the defence of Christianity) at several seminaries including Bourges. His work as an academic was not admired, and he was considered unduly influenced by his political beliefs. In the First World War he avoided front-line service.

His vehement antisemitism and hatred of left-wing politics led Auvity to welcome the Nazi invasion of France in 1940 and the collaborationist puppet government headed by Philippe Pétain, and he spoke out in favour of the Germans' imposition of forced labour on the French people.

Auvity was a priest for more than sixty years and a bishop for thirty, although a non-diocesan one for his last two decades after his enforced resignation from the diocese of Mende. He lived to the age of 90.

== Life and career ==
=== 1874–1939 ===
Auvity was born on 9 January 1874 in Germigny-l'Exempt in central France. His father was a stonemason and his mother was a housewife.

He was ordained as a priest in May 1899. Between then and his elevation to the episcopacy, he was a professor of apologétique (the defence of Christianity) successively at the seminaries of Rodez (1899–1905), Bordeaux (1905–1909) and Bourges (1909–1924). In the First World War he avoided front-line service because of a "non-pathological" ventral hernia. He was assigned to work in a military hospital in Dijon (8e section territoriale d'infirmiers militaires). In 1917, as the war continued, Auvity arranged to be released from his role as a territorial nurse to allow him to give classes.

The historian Emmanuel Legeard of the Sorbonne wrote of Auvity as an academic:

Not only was his doctrine confused and poor, but he also distorted ideas by muddled notions in a vulgar style cluttered with clichés – often unintentionally comic. It is as if he drew his inspiration from the Reader's Digest: he mixes his very personal interpretation of medieval history with perfectly anachronistic capitalist certainties and anti-communism.

In 1919 Auvity was appointed a canon of Bourges Cathedral, and in October 1924 the Archbishop of Bourges, Martin-Jérôme Izart, chose him as vicar general, a position he combined with that of director of free education and director of vocational work. In 1933 Auvity was appointed auxiliary bishop in the archdiocese of Bourges, and in 1937 he was appointed diocesan bishop of Mende.

=== Second World War and afterwards ===
Auvity was implacably opposed to socialism and was a fervent anti-semite. When Nazi Germany invaded France in 1940, he enthusiastically welcomed the news of the armistice ending the Battle of France and establishing Vichy France under the puppet government of Philippe Pétain and collaboration with Nazi Germany. In 1942 Auvity published two addresses to the faithful in the diocesan bulletin, the Semaine catholique de Mende (Catholic Weekly of Mende). One was entitled "Our duties vis-à-vis the civil power", the other "The duty of Catholics". (Note: "Nos devoirs vis-à-vis du pouvoir civil" and "Le devoir des catholiques".) Both texts stressed that a good Catholic should show "loyal and devoted fidelity to the head of state": "Subjects have the duty to submit to all legitimate authority, since legitimate authority comes from God ... The French have the strict duty to obey him (Pétain) and to show loyalty to him".

When Jules-Géraud Saliège, Archbishop of Toulouse, called for humanity towards the Jews, the prime minister, Pierre Laval, attempted to prevent the reading of the archiepiscopal letter in French churches. Many bishops ignored Laval but Auvity sought energetically to suppress its circulation within his diocese. He emphasised to Catholics that they must submit to the Service du travail obligatoire ("STO" – forced labour), leading the Nazi authorities to commend him for his "good will", in contrast with the "bad grace" of others, in the repression of "anti-Nazis, Jews, and those resisting the STO". In his episcopal letter of July 1943, Auvity addressed the young men of the Lozère prefecture: "To this precise question you ask me, 'What do we have to do? Is it better to leave?' I answer, your interest and wisdom demand that you leave."

When France was liberated in 1944, Auvity was so closely associated with the Nazis that the French authorities took him into protective custody. The prefect Henri Cordesse recorded in his memoirs that shelter was provided for Auvity at the Hôtel de Paris, the headquarters of the Kommandantur with a guard mounted by Armenians from the Ostlegionen chosen because they were unlikely to take notice of the demands of the population of Mende who wanted to "purge" their bishop. Then Maurice David arranged that Auvity be transferred in secret to the Abbey of Bonnecombe (Aveyron). Finally, François de Menthon, a fervent Catholic and Minister of Justice in the Provisional Government of the French Republic, ordered an investigation and concluded that it was too dangerous for Auvity to return to the diocese of Mende: "Many Catholics," he wrote, "think that Bishop Auvity has lost all authority, and consider that his return would not be without risk to his person, to public peace and to the peace of the Church".

The French leader, Charles de Gaulle, asked the Apostolic Nuncio to France, Angelo Giuseppe Roncalli, to have thirty Catholic prelates deprived of their sees for collaboration with the Nazis, but in the end only three diocesan bishops from mainland France – Florent du Bois de La Villerabel, Archbishop of Aix-en-Provence, Henri-Edouard Dutoit, Bishop of Arras, and Auvity – were compelled to resign, along with Roger-Henri-Marie Beaussart, Auxiliary Bishop of Paris and three prelates from France's overseas colonies. Auvity announced his departure on 22 September 1944, and resigned his episcopal seat on 28 October 1945. Contrary to custom, his successor at Mende, Bishop Maurice Rousseau, did not mention Auvity during his inaugural address, "so as not to reopen the scar".

Auvity was then appointed titular bishop in partibus of Dionysiana and retired from public life to his hometown of Germigny-l'Exempt, where he died aged ninety on 15 February 1964.

== Reputation ==
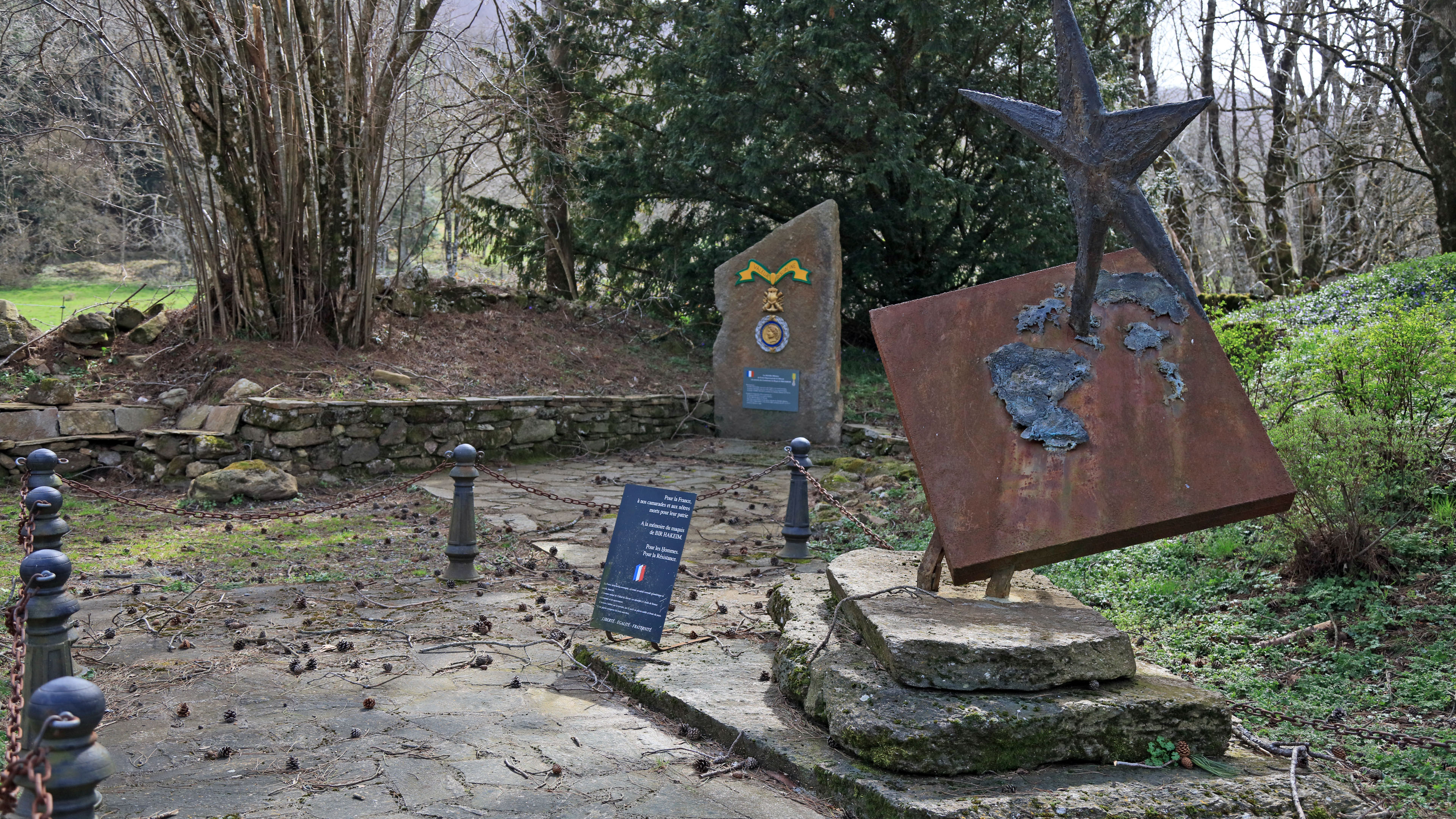
Memorial to the dead of the Bir-Hakeim Maquis

For the historians Patrick Cabanel and Annie Lacroix-Riz there is no doubt that Auvity, far from being a passive collaborationist obeying only the civil power, strongly supported Nazism. This is seen in his various positions in favour of the STO, of the Milice, of Joseph Darnand, of the Waffen-SS on the Eastern Front, and against the dissemination of the pastoral letter Et clamor Jerusalem ascendit (Note: "A cry goes up from Jerusalem" (Jeremiah 14:2)) by the archbishop of Toulouse, exhorting Catholics to a duty of humanity towards the Jews. Auvity also vehemently opposed the French Resistance, (Note: In a letter intercepted in January 1942 by the Resistance and preserved in the Archives départementales de la Lozère (2 W 3177), Auvity claims not only to have severely forbidden his diocesans to interact with the Resistance, but also to have encouraged them to denounce "Gaullists" as a "duty".) forbidding the priests of his diocese to bring to the Maquis "the aid of religion", which led him to applaud the torture and execution of the 27 prisoners of the Maquis Bir-Hakeim at the instigation of the prefect Roger Dutruch and the Gestapo against the wishes of Hauptmann Lange of the Wehrmacht responsible for their capture. Auvity never raised any protest either against the inhumane conditions of internment of anti-fascists, Jews or "undesirable foreigners" at the Rieucros Camp set up in the outbuildings of the former Mende seminary under his episcopate (1939).

== Notes, references and sources ==
=== Sources ===
- Bailly, Jacques-Augustin (1993). La Libération confisquée: le Languedoc, 1944–1945. Paris: Albin Michel. ISBN 2-22-606234-3.
- Cabanel, Patrick (1997). Vocations et migrations religieuses en Gévaudan, XVIIIe–XXe siècle. Paris: CNRS. ISBN 2-27-105384-6.
- Cordesse, Henri (1977). La Libération en Lozère: 1944–1945. Montpelier: Cordesse. ISBN 2-85-998201-9.
- Cordesse, Henri (1999). Histoire de la Résistance en Lozère: 1940–1944. Les Presses du Languedoc. ISBN 2-85-998069-5.
- Descolonges, Michèle (2022). Un camp d'internement en Lozère: Rieucros 1938–1942. Toulouse: Presses universitaires du Midi. ISBN 978-2-81-070764-5.
- Ducerf, Laurent (2006). François de Menthon, un catholique au service de la République (1900–1984). Lyon: Université Jean Moulin (Lyon). OCLC 490605616.
- Kedward, Harry Roderick (1993). In Search of the Maquis: Rural Resistance in Southern France 1942–1944. Oxford: Clarendon Press. ISBN 978-0-19-159178-5.
- Lacroix-Riz, Annie (2016). Les Elites françaises entre 1940 et 1944. Armand Colin. ISBN 978-2-20-061497-3.
- Le Moigne, Frédéric (2017). Les évêques français de Verdun à Vatican II. Rennes: Presses universitaires de Rennes. ISBN 978-2-75-352331-9.
- Leonardis, Massimo de (2014). Fede e diplomazia. Milan: Educatt. OCLC 1301966815.
