= Alès =

Subprefecture and commune in Occitanie, France

- Subprefecture and commune
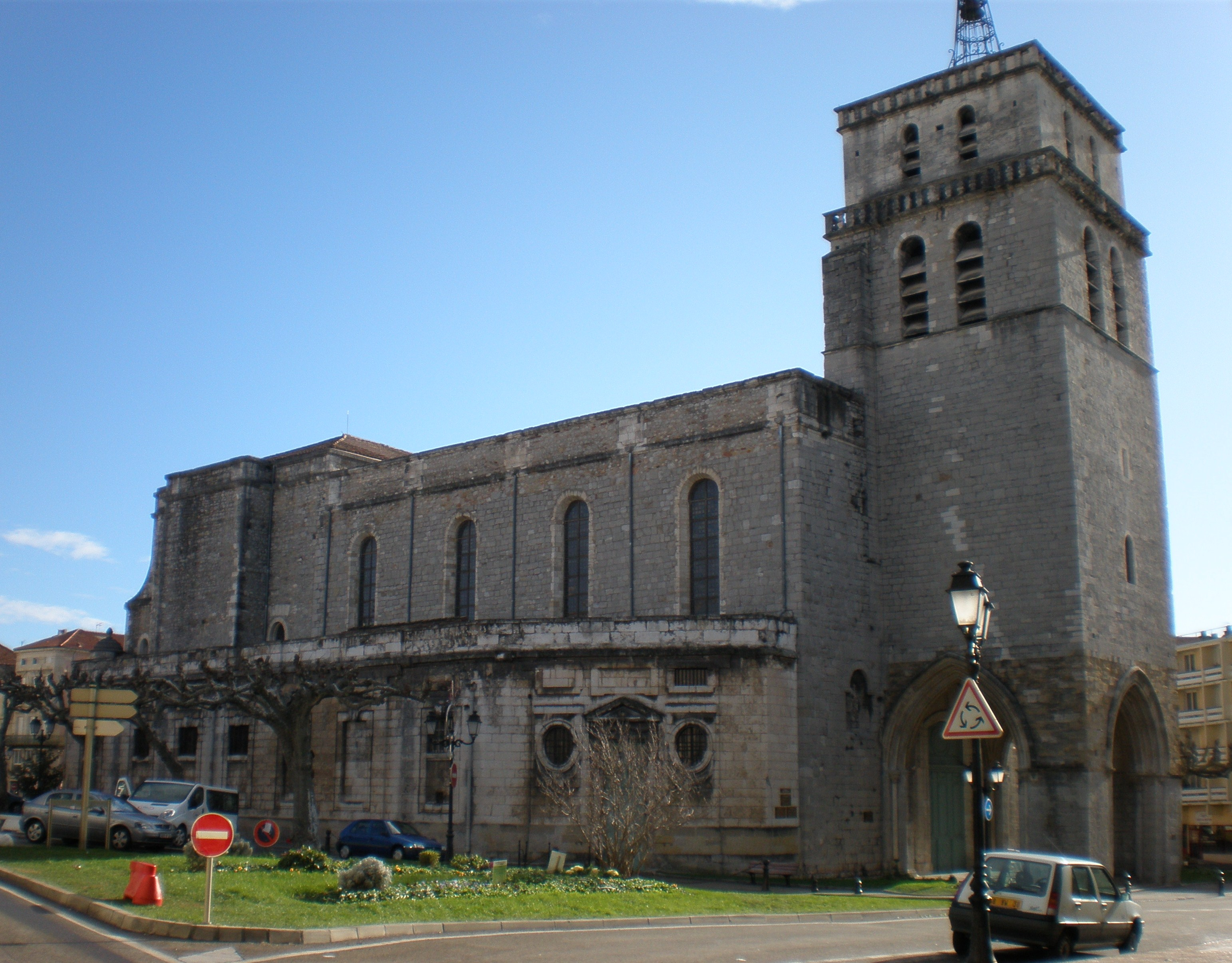
- Alès Cathedral

- Coat of arms
- Location of Alès
- Location within France Location within Occitanie
- Coordinates: 44°07′41″N 4°04′54″E
- Country: France
- Region: Occitania
- Department: Gard
- Arrondissement: Alès
- Canton: Alès-1; Alès-2; Alès-3
- Intercommunality: Alès Agglomération

Government
  - Mayor (2020–2026): Max Roustan
- Area^{1}: 23.16 km^{2} (8.94 sq mi)
- Elevation: 150 m (490 ft)
- Highest elevation: 356 m (1,168 ft)
- Lowest elevation: 116 m (381 ft)
- Population (2023): 46,125
  - Density: 1,992/km^{2} (5,158/sq mi)
- Time zone: UTC+01:00 (CET)
  - Summer (DST): UTC+02:00 (CEST)
- INSEE/Postal code: 30007 /30100
- ^{1} French Land Register data, which excludes lakes, ponds, glaciers > 1 km^{2} (0.386 sq mi or 247 acres) and river estuaries.

Alès (French: [alɛs]) is a commune and subprefecture in the Gard department in the Occitania region in Southern France. Until 1926, it was officially known as Alais.

== Geography ==
Alès lies 40 kilometres (25 miles) north-northwest of Nîmes, on the left bank of the river Gardon d'Alès, which half surrounds it. It is located at the foot of the Cévennes, near the Cévennes National Park. Alès station has rail connections to Nîmes, Mende and Clermont-Ferrand.

== History ==
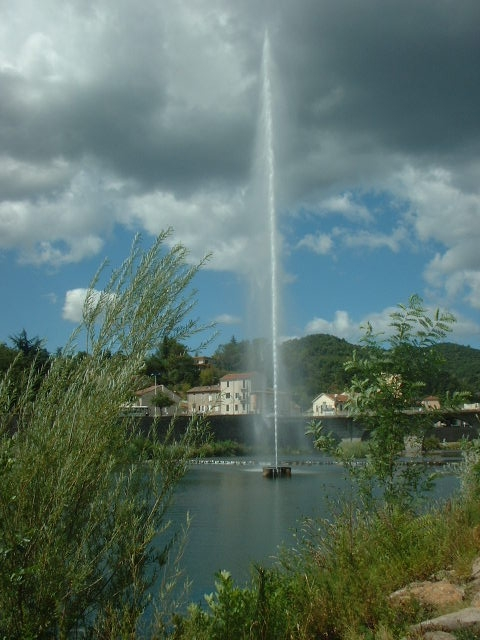
Fountain

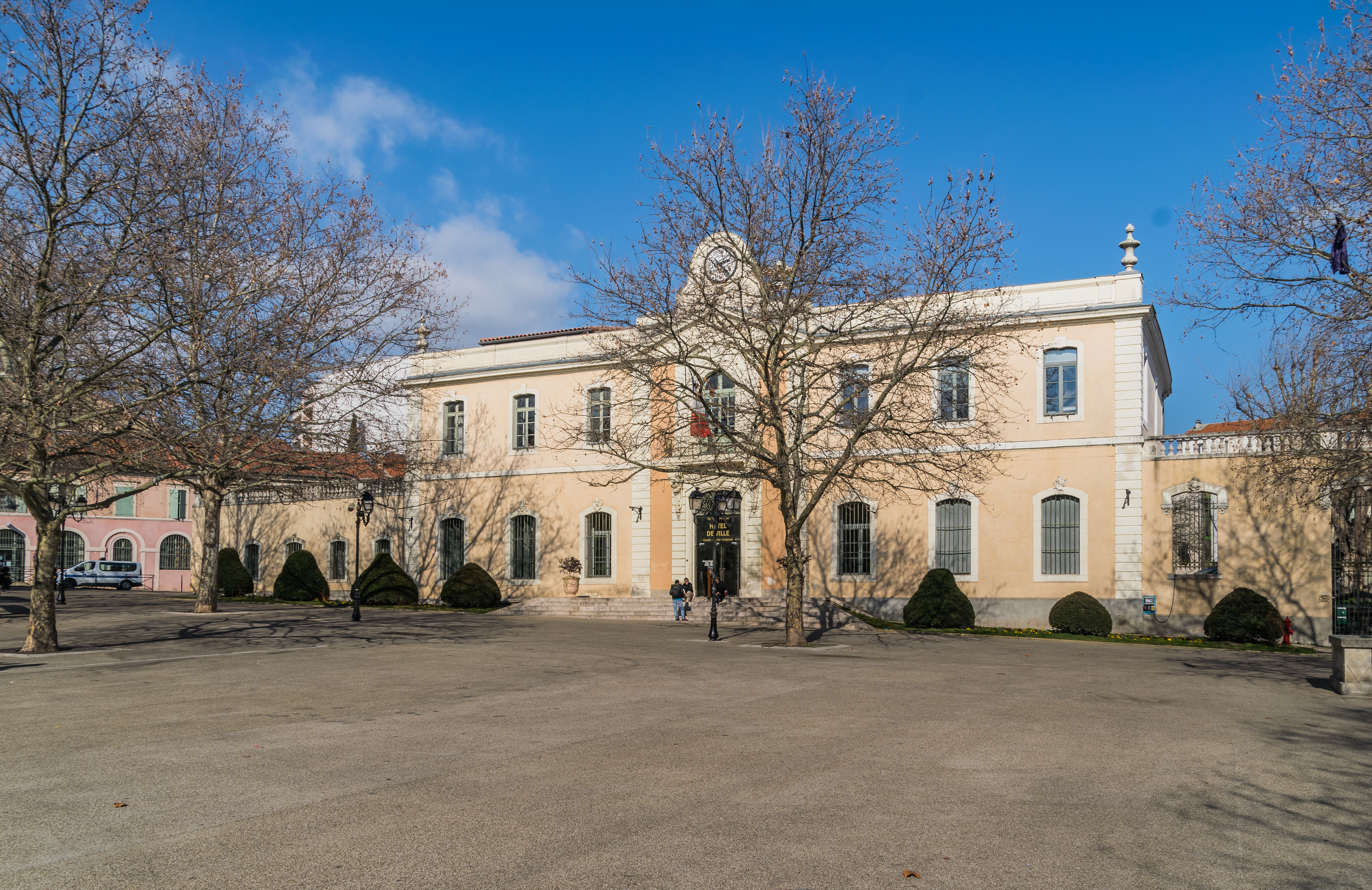
The Hôtel de Ville

Alès may be the modern successor of Arisitum, where, in about 570, Sigebert, King of Austrasia, created a bishopric. In his campaign against the Visigoths, the Merovingian king Theudebert I (533–548) conquered part of the territory of the Diocese of Nîmes. His later successor Sigebert set up the new diocese, comprising fifteen parishes in the area controlled by the Franks, which included a number of towns to the north of the Cevenne: Alès, Le Vigan, Arre, Arrigas, Meyrueis, Saint-Jean-du-Gard, Anduze, and Vissec. The diocese disappeared in the 8th century with the conquest of the whole of Septimania by the Franks. No longer a residential bishopric, Arisitum is today listed by the Catholic Church as a titular see.

After the Edict of Nantes, Alès was one of the places de sûreté given to the Huguenots. Louis XIII took back the town in 1629, and the Peace of Alès, signed on 29 June of that year, suppressed the political privileges of the Protestants, while continuing to guarantee toleration.

At the request of Louis XIV, a see was again created at Alais by Pope Innocent XII, in 1694. The future Cardinal de Bausset, Bossuet's biographer, was Bishop of Alais from 1784 to 1790. It was suppressed after the French Revolution, and its territory was divided between the diocese of Avignon and the diocese of Mende. The Hôtel de Ville was completed in 1755.

== Demographics ==
Historical population

Year	Pop.	±% p.a.
1793	10,020	—
1800	8,944	−1.61%
1806	9,387	+0.81%
1821	9,906	+0.36%
1831	12,077	+2.00%
1836	13,566	+2.35%
1841	15,884	+3.21%
1846	17,838	+2.35%
1851	18,871	+1.13%
1856	20,084	+1.25%
1861	20,257	+0.17%
1866	19,964	−0.29%
1872	19,230	−0.62%
1876	20,893	+2.10%
1881	22,255	+1.27%
1886	22,514	+0.23%
1891	24,356	+1.59%
1896	24,382	+0.02%
1901	24,940	+0.45%

Year	Pop.	±% p.a.
1906	27,435	+1.93%
1911	29,831	+1.69%
1921	36,455	+2.03%
1926	42,021	+2.88%
1931	43,248	+0.58%
1936	41,385	−0.88%
1946	34,731	−1.74%
1954	36,893	+0.76%
1962	41,360	+1.44%
1968	42,818	+0.58%
1975	44,245	+0.47%
1982	43,268	−0.32%
1990	41,037	−0.66%
1999	39,346	−0.47%
2007	40,108	+0.24%
2012	41,031	+0.46%
2017	40,219	−0.40%
2023	46,125	+2.31%

Source: EHESS and INSEE (1968–2023)

== Economy ==
Alès is the centre of a mining district and hosts the École des Mines d'Alès.

Historically, according to the Encyclopædia Britannica Eleventh Edition (1911):

"The town is one of the most important markets for raw silk and cocoons in the south of France, and the Gardon supplies power to numerous silk-mills. It is also the centre of a mineral field, which yields large quantities of coal, iron, zinc and lead; its blast-furnaces, foundries, glass-works and engineering works afford employment to many workmen."

== Sports ==
The town has one association football team called Olympique Alès who currently play in the Championnat National.

== Sights ==
Historically, according to the Encyclopædia Britannica Eleventh Edition:

"The streets are wide and its promenades and fine plane-trees make the town attractive; but the public buildings, the chief of which are the Saint-Jean-Baptiste cathedral, a heavy building of the 18th century, and the citadel, which serves as barracks and prison, are of small interest."

- Parc botanique de la Tour Vieille

== Notable people ==
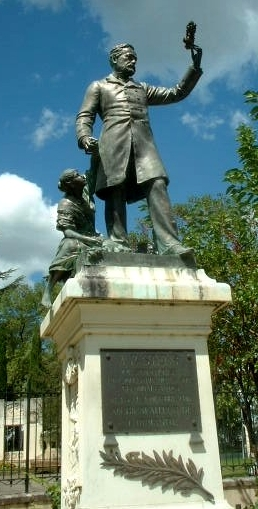
Statue of Louis Pasteur

- Rigord (c. 1150 – c. 1209), chronicler (probable birthplace)
- Marguerite de Cambis (fl. 1550s), translator
- Jean-Pierre des Ours de Mandajors (1679–1747), historian and playwright
- Jean-Baptiste Dumas (1800–1884), chemist
- Gabriel Montoya (1868–1914), Parisian chansonnier
- Charles Dugas (1885–1957), archaeologist and hellenist
- Edgard de Larminat (1895–1962), general
- Louis Leprince-Ringuet (1901–2000), physicist
- Lucile Randon (1904–2023), supercentenarian and former world's oldest person
- Maurice André (1933–2012), trumpeter
- Catherine Daufès-Roux (born 1963), former Member of Parliament
- Laurent Blanc (born 1965), footballer
- Stéphane Sarrazin (born 1975), sportscar racing driver, rally driver
- Romain Dumas (born 1977), sportscar racing driver
- Audrey Lamy (born 1981), actress and humorist
- Nabil El Zhar (born 1986), footballer
- Vincent Abril (born 1995), sportscar racing driver

Louis Pasteur did his research on the silkworm disease (pébrine and flacherie) at Alès, and the town dedicated a bust to his memory. There is also a statue of the chemist J.B. Dumas. Alphonse Daudet wrote his semi-autobiographical novel "Le Petit Chose" while teaching at the Collège of Alès.

== Twin towns – sister cities ==
Alès is twinned with:

- Kilmarnock, Scotland, United Kingdom

== Climate ==
Climate data for Alès (Saint-Christol-lès-Alès) (1991−2020 normals, extremes 1949−present)
Month	Jan	Feb	Mar	Apr	May	Jun	Jul	Aug	Sep	Oct	Nov	Dec	Year
Record high °C (°F)	22.0 (71.6)	24.4 (75.9)	28.0 (82.4)	32.0 (89.6)	36.0 (96.8)	43.4 (110.1)	40.5 (104.9)	44.1 (111.4)	39.0 (102.2)	33.0 (91.4)	25.4 (77.7)	21.5 (70.7)	44.1 (111.4)
Mean daily maximum °C (°F)	11.4 (52.5)	13.0 (55.4)	17.2 (63.0)	20.1 (68.2)	24.3 (75.7)	29.2 (84.6)	32.5 (90.5)	32.0 (89.6)	26.7 (80.1)	20.7 (69.3)	15.1 (59.2)	11.6 (52.9)	21.1 (70.0)
Daily mean °C (°F)	6.4 (43.5)	7.3 (45.1)	10.8 (51.4)	13.7 (56.7)	17.7 (63.9)	22.0 (71.6)	24.8 (76.6)	24.4 (75.9)	19.9 (67.8)	15.4 (59.7)	10.2 (50.4)	6.9 (44.4)	15.0 (59.0)
Mean daily minimum °C (°F)	1.5 (34.7)	1.6 (34.9)	4.4 (39.9)	7.3 (45.1)	11.0 (51.8)	14.7 (58.5)	17.2 (63.0)	16.8 (62.2)	13.1 (55.6)	10.0 (50.0)	5.3 (41.5)	2.2 (36.0)	8.8 (47.8)
Record low °C (°F)	−12.5 (9.5)	−17.8 (0.0)	−10.0 (14.0)	−3.1 (26.4)	−0.5 (31.1)	3.0 (37.4)	7.0 (44.6)	5.0 (41.0)	1.9 (35.4)	−2.5 (27.5)	−7.5 (18.5)	−13.0 (8.6)	−17.8 (0.0)
Average precipitation mm (inches)	82.1 (3.23)	55.7 (2.19)	72.9 (2.87)	83.1 (3.27)	77.7 (3.06)	49.1 (1.93)	38.5 (1.52)	50.3 (1.98)	160.6 (6.32)	153.5 (6.04)	133.2 (5.24)	89.8 (3.54)	1,046.5 (41.20)
Average precipitation days (≥ 1.0 mm)	7.1	4.9	5.6	7.2	7.5	5.3	3.8	5.2	5.9	8.7	8.8	7.3	77.4
Source: Meteociel

== See also ==
- Communes of the Gard department
