= Ribaute-les-Tavernes =

- Commune
- Coat of arms
- Location of Ribaute-les-Tavernes
- Location within France Location within Occitanie
- Coordinates: 44°02′19″N 4°04′54″E
- Country: France
- Region: Occitania
- Department: Gard
- Arrondissement: Alès
- Canton: Alès-1
- Intercommunality: Alès Agglomération

Government
  - Mayor (2020–2026): Frédéric Itier
- Area^{1}: 14.27 km^{2} (5.51 sq mi)
- Elevation: 140 m (460 ft)
- Highest elevation: 199 m (653 ft)
- Lowest elevation: 90 m (300 ft)
- Population (2023): 2,040
  - Density: 143/km^{2} (370/sq mi)
- Time zone: UTC+01:00 (CET)
  - Summer (DST): UTC+02:00 (CEST)
- INSEE/Postal code: 30214 /30720
- ^{1} French Land Register data, which excludes lakes, ponds, glaciers > 1 km^{2} (0.386 sq mi or 247 acres) and river estuaries.

Ribaute-les-Tavernes (French pronunciation: [ʁibot le tavɛʁn]; Occitan: Ribauta e las Tavèrnas) is a commune in the Gard department in southern France.

== Population ==
Historical population

Year	Pop.	±% p.a.
1793	608	—
1821	653	+0.26%
1846	884	+1.22%
1872	903	+0.08%
1901	868	−0.14%
1926	867	−0.00%
1946	849	−0.10%
1962	1,008	+1.08%
1968	963	−0.76%

Year	Pop.	±% p.a.
1975	1,011	+0.70%
1982	1,076	+0.89%
1990	1,136	+0.68%
1999	1,258	+1.14%
2007	1,627	+3.27%
2012	1,881	+2.94%
2017	2,209	+3.27%
2023	2,040	−1.32%

Source: EHESS and INSEE (1968–2023)

== See also ==
- Communes of the Gard department
