= Bagard =

Commune in Occitanie, France

- Commune
- Coat of arms
- Location of Bagard
- Location within France Location within Occitanie
- Coordinates: 44°04′26″N 4°03′06″E
- Country: France
- Region: Occitania
- Department: Gard
- Arrondissement: Alès
- Canton: Alès-1
- Intercommunality: Alès Agglomération

Government
  - Mayor (2020–2026): Thierry Bazalgette
- Area^{1}: 14.55 km^{2} (5.62 sq mi)
- Elevation: 102 m (335 ft)
- Highest elevation: 440 m (1,440 ft)
- Lowest elevation: 119 m (390 ft)
- Population (2023): 2,605
  - Density: 179.0/km^{2} (463.7/sq mi)
- Time zone: UTC+01:00 (CET)
  - Summer (DST): UTC+02:00 (CEST)
- INSEE/Postal code: 30027 /30140
- ^{1} French Land Register data, which excludes lakes, ponds, glaciers > 1 km^{2} (0.386 sq mi or 247 acres) and river estuaries.

Bagard (French pronunciation: [baɡaʁ]; Occitan: Bagarn) is a commune in the Gard department in southern France.

== Population ==
Historical population
Year	Pop.	±% p.a.
1968	1,025	—
1975	1,198	+2.25%
1982	1,523	+3.49%
1990	1,771	+1.90%
1999	1,970	+1.19%
2007	2,305	+1.98%
2012	2,502	+1.65%
2017	2,574	+0.57%
2023	2,605	+0.20%
Source: INSEE

== See also ==
- Communes of the Gard department
