= Saint-Christol-lès-Alès =

- Commune
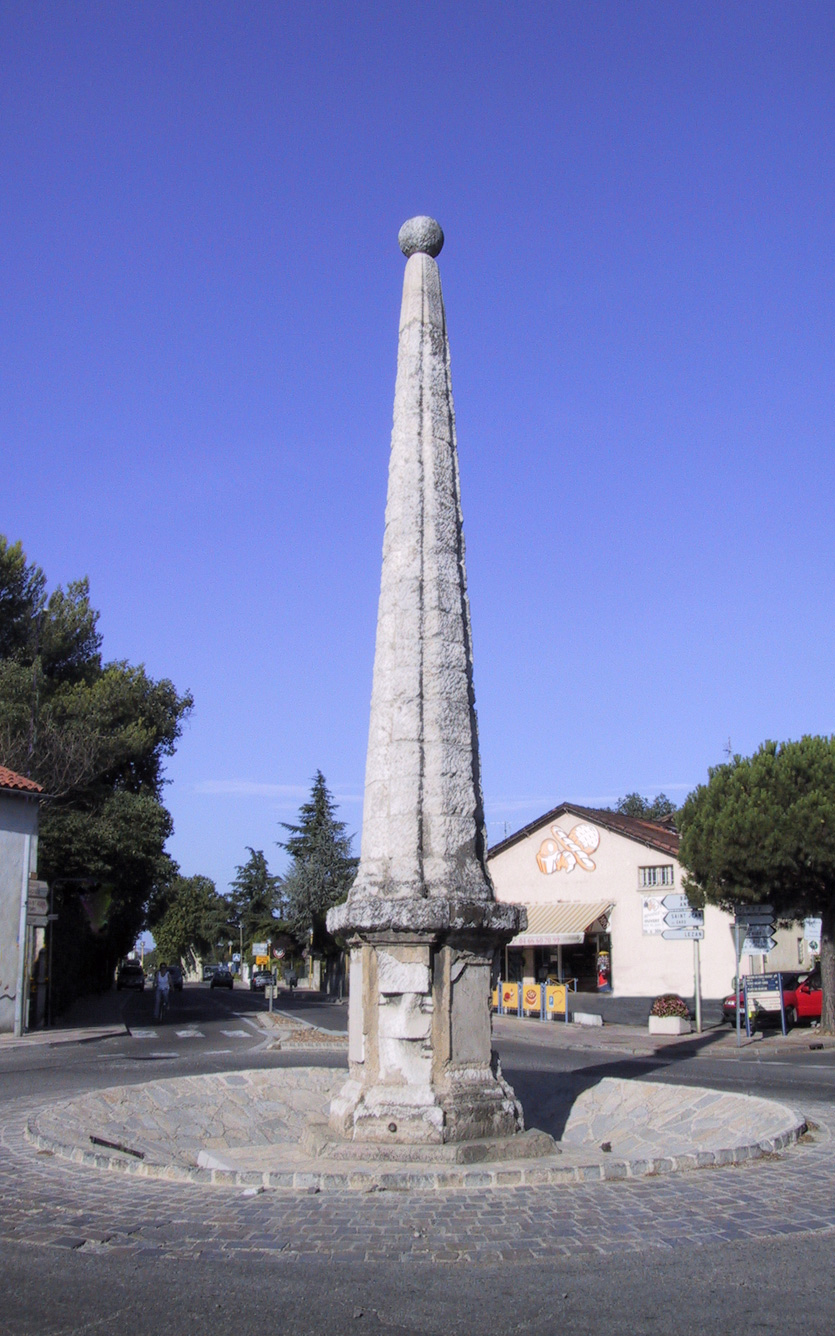
- The Pyramid, erected in 1777

- Coat of arms
- Location of Saint-Christol-lès-Alès
- Location within France Location within Occitanie
- Coordinates: 44°05′07″N 4°04′39″E
- Country: France
- Region: Occitania
- Department: Gard
- Arrondissement: Alès
- Canton: Alès-1
- Intercommunality: Alès Agglomération

Government
  - Mayor (2020–2026): Jean-Charles Benezet
- Area^{1}: 20.25 km^{2} (7.82 sq mi)
- Elevation: 134 m (440 ft)
- Highest elevation: 391 m (1,283 ft)
- Lowest elevation: 103 m (338 ft)
- Population (2023): 7,310
  - Density: 361/km^{2} (935/sq mi)
- Time zone: UTC+01:00 (CET)
  - Summer (DST): UTC+02:00 (CEST)
- INSEE/Postal code: 30243 /30380
- ^{1} French Land Register data, which excludes lakes, ponds, glaciers > 1 km^{2} (0.386 sq mi or 247 acres) and river estuaries.

Saint-Christol-lès-Alès (French pronunciation: [sɛ̃ kʁistɔl lez‿alɛs], literally Saint-Christol near Alès; Occitan: Sent Cristòu d'Alès) is a commune in the Gard department in southern France.

== Climate ==
Temperatures reached 44.1 °C (111.4 °F) in Saint-Christol-lès-Alès and Conqueyrac on 12 August 2003 during the 2003 European heat wave. They were France's highest temperatures ever recorded until 28 June 2019, when temperatures reached as high as 45.9 °C (114.6 °F) in southern France.

Climate data for Saint-Christol-lès-Alès (1991−2020 normals, extremes 1949−present)
Month	Jan	Feb	Mar	Apr	May	Jun	Jul	Aug	Sep	Oct	Nov	Dec	Year
Record high °C (°F)	22.0 (71.6)	24.4 (75.9)	28.0 (82.4)	32.0 (89.6)	36.0 (96.8)	43.4 (110.1)	40.5 (104.9)	44.1 (111.4)	39.0 (102.2)	33.0 (91.4)	25.4 (77.7)	21.5 (70.7)	44.1 (111.4)
Mean daily maximum °C (°F)	11.4 (52.5)	13.0 (55.4)	17.2 (63.0)	20.1 (68.2)	24.3 (75.7)	29.2 (84.6)	32.5 (90.5)	32.0 (89.6)	26.7 (80.1)	20.7 (69.3)	15.1 (59.2)	11.6 (52.9)	21.1 (70.0)
Daily mean °C (°F)	6.4 (43.5)	7.3 (45.1)	10.8 (51.4)	13.7 (56.7)	17.7 (63.9)	22.0 (71.6)	24.8 (76.6)	24.4 (75.9)	19.9 (67.8)	15.4 (59.7)	10.2 (50.4)	6.9 (44.4)	15.0 (59.0)
Mean daily minimum °C (°F)	1.5 (34.7)	1.6 (34.9)	4.4 (39.9)	7.3 (45.1)	11.0 (51.8)	14.7 (58.5)	17.2 (63.0)	16.8 (62.2)	13.1 (55.6)	10.0 (50.0)	5.3 (41.5)	2.2 (36.0)	8.8 (47.8)
Record low °C (°F)	−12.5 (9.5)	−17.8 (0.0)	−10.0 (14.0)	−3.1 (26.4)	−0.5 (31.1)	3.0 (37.4)	7.0 (44.6)	5.0 (41.0)	1.9 (35.4)	−2.5 (27.5)	−7.5 (18.5)	−13.0 (8.6)	−17.8 (0.0)
Average precipitation mm (inches)	82.1 (3.23)	55.7 (2.19)	72.9 (2.87)	83.1 (3.27)	77.7 (3.06)	49.1 (1.93)	38.5 (1.52)	50.3 (1.98)	160.6 (6.32)	153.5 (6.04)	133.2 (5.24)	89.8 (3.54)	1,046.5 (41.20)
Average precipitation days (≥ 1.0 mm)	7.1	4.9	5.6	7.2	7.5	5.3	3.8	5.2	5.9	8.7	8.8	7.3	77.4
Source: Météo-France

== Population ==
Historical population

Year	Pop.	±% p.a.
1793	726	—
1846	1,260	+1.05%
1901	1,397	+0.19%
1926	1,433	+0.10%
1946	1,580	+0.49%
1954	1,724	+1.10%
1962	2,025	+2.03%
1968	2,595	+4.22%

Year	Pop.	±% p.a.
1975	3,304	+3.51%
1982	3,970	+2.66%
1990	4,973	+2.86%
1999	5,492	+1.11%
2007	6,472	+2.07%
2012	6,776	+0.92%
2017	7,030	+0.74%
2023	7,310	+0.65%

Source: EHESS and INSEE (1968-2023)

== See also ==
- Communes of the Gard department
