= Paul Émile Joseph Bertrand =

Roman Catholic prelate (1925–2022)

His Excellency Paul Émile Joseph Bertrand
- Bishop Emeritus of Mende
- Archdiocese: Montpellier
- Diocese: Mende
- Appointed: 14 September 1989
- Term ended: 16 October 2001
- Predecessor: Roger Lucien Meindre
- Successor: Robert Jean Louis Le Gall
- Previous posts: Auxiliary Bishop of Lyon and Titular Bishop of Tagaria (1975–1989)

Orders
- Ordination: 10 October 1948
- Consecration: 14 September 1975 by Alexandre Renard

Personal details
- Born: 11 July 1925 La Louptière-Thénard, France
- Died: 27 July 2022 (aged 97) Mende, France

Paul Émile Joseph Bertramd (11 July 1925 – 27 July 2022) was a French Roman Catholic prelate.

Bertrand was born in France and was ordained to the priesthood in 1948. He served as the titular bishop of Tagaria and the auxiliary bishop of the Archdiocese of Lyon, France, from 1975 to 1989 and as the bishop of the Roman Catholic Diocese of Mende from 1989 until his retirement in 2001.

Catholic Church titles
Preceded by Roger Lucien Meindre	Bishop of Mende; 1989–2001	Succeeded by Robert Jean Louis Le Gall
Preceded by Alberto Cosme do Amaral	Titular Bishop of Tagaria; 1975–1989	Succeeded by Jan Graubner
Preceded by —	Auxiliary Bishop of Lyon; 1975–1989	Succeeded by —
