= Boisset-et-Gaujac =

Commune in Occitanie, France

- Commune
- Coat of arms
- Location of Boisset-et-Gaujac
- Location within France Location within Occitanie
- Coordinates: 44°03′01″N 4°01′13″E
- Country: France
- Region: Occitania
- Department: Gard
- Arrondissement: Alès
- Canton: Alès-1
- Intercommunality: Alès Agglomération

Government
  - Mayor (2023–2026): Philippe Allié
- Area^{1}: 14.24 km^{2} (5.50 sq mi)
- Elevation: 128 m (420 ft)
- Highest elevation: 420 m (1,380 ft)
- Lowest elevation: 105 m (344 ft)
- Population (2023): 2,707
  - Density: 190.1/km^{2} (492.4/sq mi)
- Time zone: UTC+01:00 (CET)
  - Summer (DST): UTC+02:00 (CEST)
- INSEE/Postal code: 30042 /30140
- ^{1} French Land Register data, which excludes lakes, ponds, glaciers > 1 km^{2} (0.386 sq mi or 247 acres) and river estuaries.

Boisset-et-Gaujac (French pronunciation: [bwasɛ e ɡoʒak]; Occitan: Boisset e Gaujac) is a commune in the Gard department in southern France.

== Population ==
Historical population

Year	Pop.	±% p.a.
1793	244	—
1821	190	−0.89%
1846	431	+3.33%
1872	575	+1.11%
1901	513	−0.39%
1926	446	−0.56%
1946	349	−1.22%
1962	553	+2.92%
1968	711	+4.28%

Year	Pop.	±% p.a.
1975	918	+3.72%
1982	1,106	+2.70%
1990	1,548	+4.29%
1999	1,787	+1.61%
2007	2,238	+2.85%
2012	2,443	+1.77%
2017	2,545	+0.82%
2023	2,707	+1.03%

Source: EHESS and INSEE (1968-2023)

== See also ==
- Communes of the Gard department
