= Saint-Jean-du-Pin =

- Commune
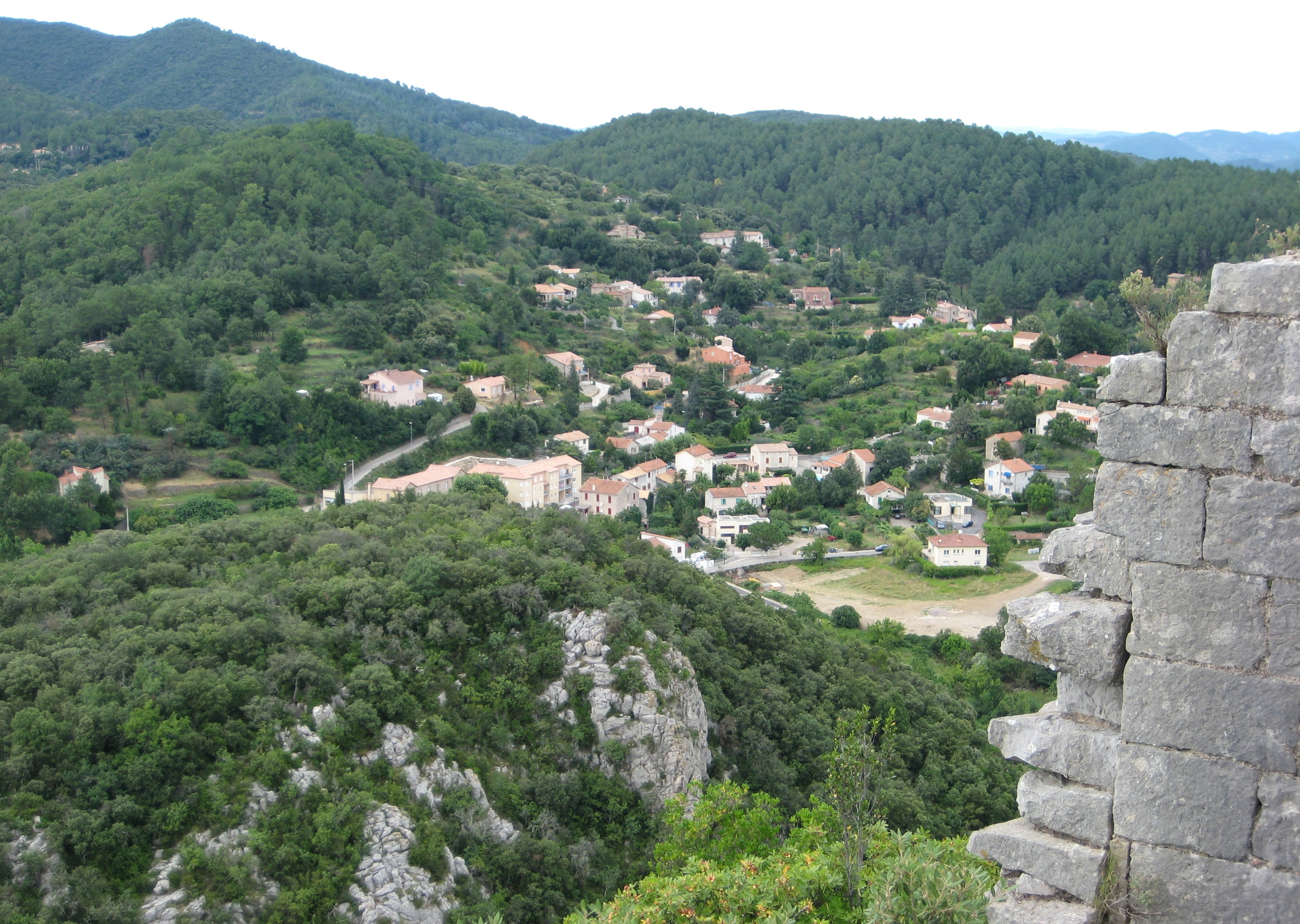
- A general view of Saint-Jean-du-Pin
- Location of Saint-Jean-du-Pin
- Location within France Location within Occitanie
- Coordinates: 44°07′03″N 4°03′05″E
- Country: France
- Region: Occitania
- Department: Gard
- Arrondissement: Alès
- Canton: Alès-1
- Intercommunality: Alès Agglomération

Government
  - Mayor (2020–2026): Julie Lopez Dubreuil
- Area^{1}: 13.96 km^{2} (5.39 sq mi)
- Elevation: 200 m (660 ft)
- Highest elevation: 561 m (1,841 ft)
- Lowest elevation: 159 m (522 ft)
- Population (2023): 1,508
  - Density: 108.0/km^{2} (279.8/sq mi)
- Time zone: UTC+01:00 (CET)
  - Summer (DST): UTC+02:00 (CEST)
- INSEE/Postal code: 30270 /30140
- ^{1} French Land Register data, which excludes lakes, ponds, glaciers > 1 km^{2} (0.386 sq mi or 247 acres) and river estuaries.

Saint-Jean-du-Pin (French pronunciation: [sɛ̃ ʒɑ̃ dy pɛ̃]; Occitan: Sent Joan del Pin) is a commune in the Gard department in southern France.

== Population ==
Historical population
| Year | Pop. | ±% p.a. |
|---|---|---|
| 1968 | 790 | — |
| 1975 | 847 | +1.00% |
| 1982 | 1,131 | +4.22% |
| 1990 | 1,231 | +1.06% |
| 1999 | 1,219 | −0.11% |
| 2007 | 1,285 | +0.66% |
| 2012 | 1,392 | +1.61% |
| 2017 | 1,511 | +1.65% |
| 2023 | 1,508 | −0.03% |
Source: INSEE

== See also ==
- Communes of the Gard department
