= Notre-Dame de Germigny-l'Exempt =

Church in Germigny-l'Exempt, France

Coordinates: 46°55′08″N 2°53′50″E

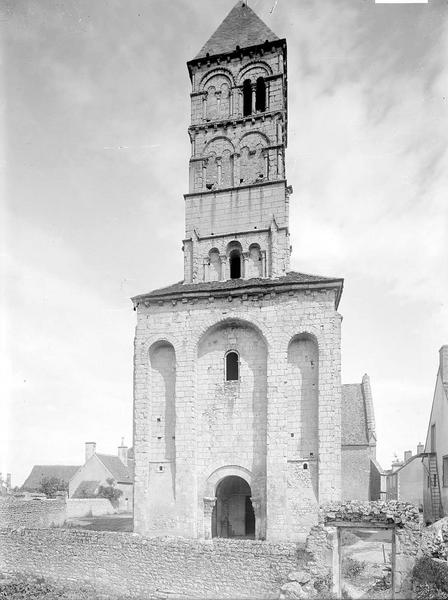

Notre-Dame de Germigny-l'Exempt is a Roman Catholic church in the town of Germigny-l'Exempt in Berry, France. It was built in the 12th century in the Romanesque architectural tradition.

== History ==
The exceptionally tall bell tower-porch was built after the siege of 1108 by Louis VI the Fat as a symbol of the Capetian ″Pax Dei″. The inconographic program of its inner portal of 1215 is inherited from the North porch of the West portal of the abbey church in Saint-Gilles du Gard and the North porch of the West portal of the Laon Cathedral. The tympanum showing a Sedes Sapientiae is meant to celebrate the triumph of the Church (the Virgin being symbolic of the Catholic Church) upon the heretics whose common point is to reject the real presence in the eucharist.

Notre-Dame de Germigny-l'Exempt is listed as a monument historique since 1912. According to the Law of 31 December 1913, the object of which is to protect the historical monuments classified by the State, the classified tower-porch of Notre-Dame belongs to the French Republic as its ″inalienable″ property.

== Bibliography ==
- Legeard, Emmanuel (2022). Germigny-l'Exempt ou les Trois Deniers de Gaspard [Germigny-l'Exempt or Gaspard's three coins] (in French). Paris: L'Harmattan. ISBN 978-2-14-027811-2.
