= Dionysiana =

Africa Proconsularis (125 AD)

The diocese of Dionysiana (in Latin: Dioecesis Dionysianensis) is a suppressed and titular see of the Roman Catholic Church.

The Diocese of Dionysos, was centered on a Roman town of the Roman province of Byzacena ( in today's Tunisia) during late antiquity.

== History ==
There are three known bishops of this diocese during antiquity, which is one of the oldest in Roman North Africa.

- Pomponio is first known for a letter he wrote in 249 to Bishop Cyprian of Carthage. He also participated in two Carthaginian synods (251 and 256) on the issue of the lapsii.
- In 393, the diocese was occupied by a Donatist bishop of the Maximianist sect, called Fortunato, who took part in Council of Cabarsussi against Primiano of Carthage.
- Another Donatist, Vittore, was sitting in Dionysia at the Council of Carthage (411).
- Finally, the acts of the council convened by the Arian King Huneric of the Vandal Kingdom in 484 show that the diocese was vacant at that time.

The diocese ceased to effectively function with the Arab–Byzantine wars in 698.

Since 1925 Dionysius now survives as a titular bishopric and the current bishop is Gary W. Janak, auxiliary bishop of San Antonio, Texas.

- Antonio Malecki (1926–1935)
- Antoni Jacek Zimniak 1936–1943)
- François-Louis Auvity (1945–1964)
- Diego Maria Gómez Tamayo (1964–1971)
- Rudolf Schmid (1972–2012)
- Quesnel Alphonse (2012–2014)
- Martín Fassi (2014–2020)
- Gary Janak (2021–present)
