= Florent du Bois de La Villerabel =

French archbishop

- Archbishop of Aix-en-Provence and Arles and Embrun
- Church: Catholic Church
- Installed: 1940 (as Archbishop of Aix)
- Term ended: 1944
- Predecessor: Clément Roques
- Successor: Charles-Marie-Joseph-Henri de Provencheres

Orders
- Ordination: June 1900
- Consecration: May 1940 by Pope Pius XII

Personal details
- Born: 29 September 1877 Saint-Brieuc, France
- Died: 7 February 1951 (aged 73) Saint-Brieuc, France

Florent Michel Marie Joseph du Bois de La Villerabel (29 September 1877 – 7 February 1951), archbishop of Aix, Arles and Embrun (1940–1944), was the most prominent of seven French mainland or colonial bishops who, in the aftermath of the Liberation, were obliged to submit their resignations to Pope Pius XII because of their close collaboration with the Germans during the German occupation of France from 1940 to 1944.

== Life and career ==
Villerabel was born in Saint-Brieuc in Brittany. He was ordained as a priest in June 1900, consecrated by his cousin, André du Bois de La Villerabel, bishop of Amiens, subsequently Archbishop of Rouen and Primate of Normandy. He was appointed Auxiliary Bishop of Tours in 1920. The following year he was appointed diocesan Bishop of Annecy and in May 1940 he was appointed Archbishop of Aix.

Villerabel was a leading clerical collaborationist with the Nazis after the German invasion of France in 1940. He opposed La Voix du Vatican, the Pope's radio station, which was critical of the Vichy government. After the liberation of France in 1944, Villerabel was the most senior of seven French mainland or colonial bishops who were obliged to submit their resignations to Pope Pius XII.

The head of the French government, Charles de Gaulle, proposed that thirty collaborationist prelates should resign, but the diplomatic skills of the Papal Nuncio, Angelo Giuseppe Roncalli, reduced the number. A coadjutor to François-Jean-Marie Serrand, Bishop of Saint-Brieuc and Tréguier was appointed, and the then archbishops of Reims and Bordeaux were barred from any future appointment as cardinals.

Other bishops obliged to resign included Henri-Édouard Dutoit of Arras, François-Louis Auvity of Mende, and Roger-Henri-Marie Beaussart, auxiliary of Paris, who had welcomed de Gaulle at Notre-Dame in 1944 on behalf of the archbishop, Cardinal Suhard; the latter could not attend the ceremony as he was under house arrest.

Villerabel's retirement (when he resumed his former titulature of Aenos or Enos which he had held as auxiliary bishop to the Archbishop of Tours from 1920 to 1940) was spent at Solesmes Abbey and at St Brieuc. He died in his home city of Saint-Brieuc on 7 February 1951 at the age of 73.

== Sources ==
- Leonardis, Massimo de (2014). Fede e diplomazia. Milan: Educatt. OCLC 1301966815.
- Moore, William Mortimer (2015). Paris '44: The City of Light Redeemed. Oxford and Philadelphia: Casemate. ISBN 9781612003436.
