= Charles Dugas =

French archaeologist (1885–1957)

Charles Dugas (22 October 1885, in Alès – 4 October 1957, in Montpellier) was a 20th-century French archaeologist, specialized in the study of pottery of ancient Greece, a member of the French School at Athens and dean of the Faculté des lettres de Lyon.

== Published works ==
Charles Dugas published numerous articles, available in the archives of the Faculty of Arts of Lyon, and those of the French School at Athens. He also wrote many books, some of which are still published today:

- 1911: Les fouilles de Tégée (1910), Paris, Alphonse Picard et Fils
- 1919: Les étapes de la crise grecque, 1915-1918, Paris, Bossard, (under the pseudonym Charles Frégier)
- 1924: La Céramique grecque, Payot, Paris
- 1924: Le Sanctuaire d'Aléa Athéna à Tégée au IVe siècle, Paris, Geuthner
- 1925: La Céramique des Cyclades, De Boccard
- 1923: Classification des céramiques antiques : céramiques Lacono-Cyrenéennes, Mâcon, Impr. de Protat frères
- 1930: Aison et la peinture céramique à Athènes à l'époque de Périclès
- 1930: Le Trésor de céramique de Délos, De Boccard
- 1958: Thésée, images et récits, with Robert Flacelière
- 1960: Recueil Charles Dugas, De Boccard, (posthumous)

He participated in the collection of excavations entitled Exploration Archéologique de Délos of the French School at Athens, first published by De Boccard. He is the author of:

- 1928: volume 10 : Les Vases de l'Héraion
- 1934: volume 15 : Les vases préhelléniques et géométriques
- 1935: volume 17 : Les vases orientalisants de style non mélien
- 1952: volume 21 : Les vases attiques à figures rouges.

There is a collection of his articles, produced by the Société des amis de la Bibliothèque Salomon Reinach under the leadership of Henri Metzger in his honor and published in 1961:

- Fasc. I. Recueil Charles Dugas, Diffusion De Boccard

== See also ==
- Pottery of ancient Greece
- French School at Athens
