= Mende Cathedral =

Cathedral in Lozère, France

Coordinates: 44°31′2″N 3°29′55″E

Mende Cathedral Basilique-cathédrale Notre-Dame-et-Saint-Privat de Mende
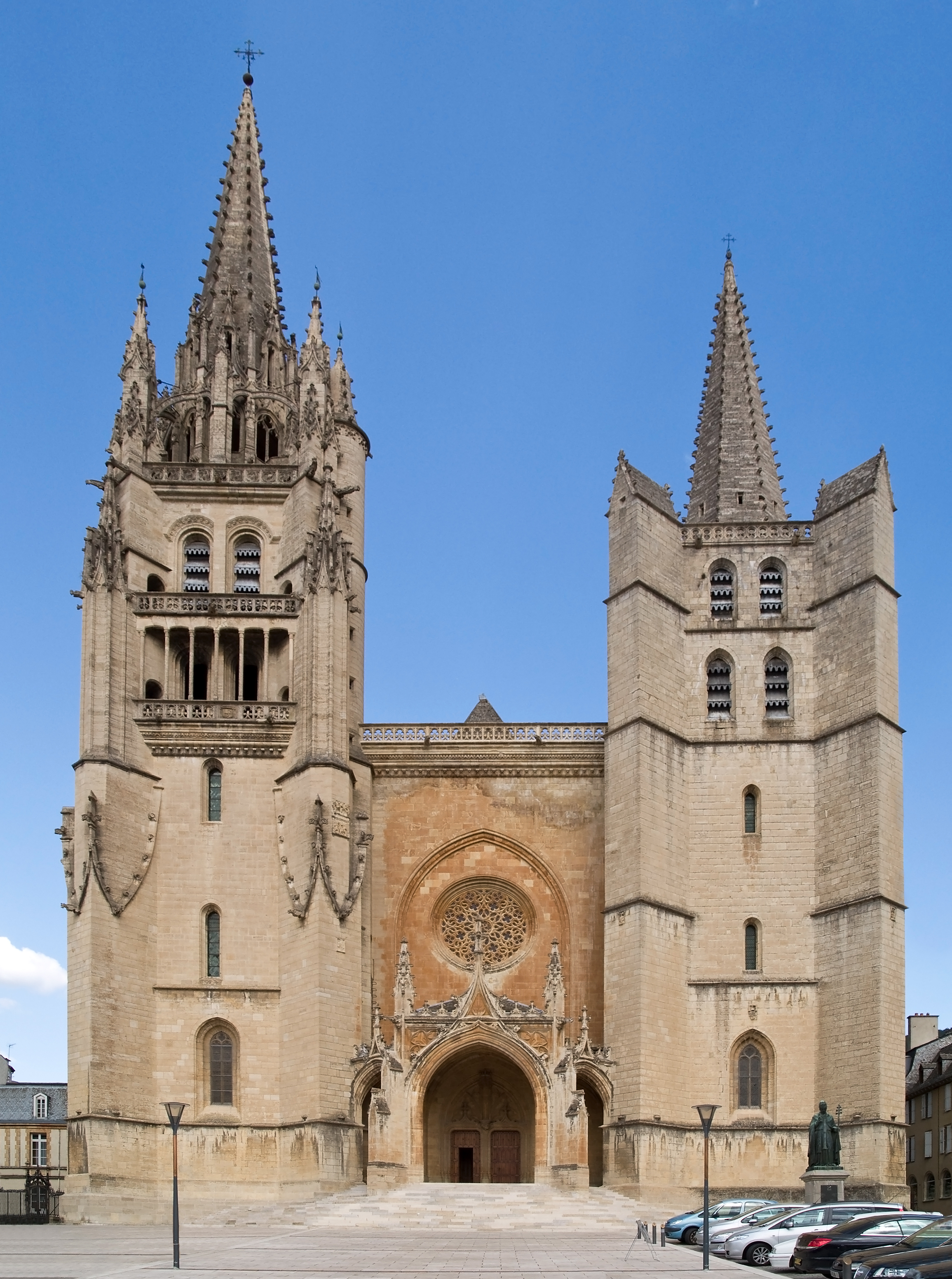
- Mende Cathedral

Religion
- Affiliation: Roman Catholic
- Province: Bishop of Mende
- Region: Lozère
- Ecclesiastical or organisational status: Cathedral
- Status: Active

Location
- Location: Mende, France
- Interactive map of Mende Cathedral; Basilique-cathédrale Notre-Dame-et-Saint-Privat de Mende

Architecture
- Type: church
- Style: Romanesque, Gothic

Mende Cathedral (French: Basilique-cathédrale Notre-Dame-et-Saint-Privat de Mende) is a Roman Catholic Cathedral and Minor Basilica. It is the Seat of the Bishop of the Diocese of Mende, located in the Department of Lozere. The Tourist Office of the City of Mende describes the Cathedral as "A Jewel, the Nerve Center of the City." The Cathedral enshrines the Tomb of Saint Privat. Construction began in 1369 on the initiative of Pope Urban V. The Cathedral was consecrated for the first time in 1469. The Pope Urban V was a native of the region, which had been previously known as the County of Gévaudan, located within the far northern extreme of the Province of Languedoc. After the conclusion of the French Revolution in 1789 all the provincial boundaries were re-mapped. The locale around the Diocese of Mende was redrawn as the Revolutionary Department of Lozere, named after a nearby mountain peak.

The Cathedral's two bell towers were added between 1508 and 1512, the large bell tower rising 84 meters was commissioned by the Bishop François de la Rovère. The small bell tower was commissioned simultaneously by agreement of the Cathedral's administrative clergy who did not consult their Bishop on this matter. Standing at only 65 meters, it was intentionally left plain, in contrast to the other, more ornate tower.

The building was partially destroyed during the Wars of Religion by Mathieu Merle in 1581 and then rebuilt, "identically but without fashions or ornaments" between 1598 and 1620. Also destroyed in this incident was the great bell “Non-Pareille" (unrivalled) which was the largest bell known to exist when it was hung in the belfry in 1516. This bell could be heard in excess of ten miles. Only the bell's clapper survives, and is a local treasure.

Housed in the Cathedral are many other treasures of the Church, including Virgin of the Twelfth, A portrait of Pope Urbain the XIV, an original pipe organ and furnishings dated to the seventeenth century, and a Tapestry of Aubusson created in 1707.

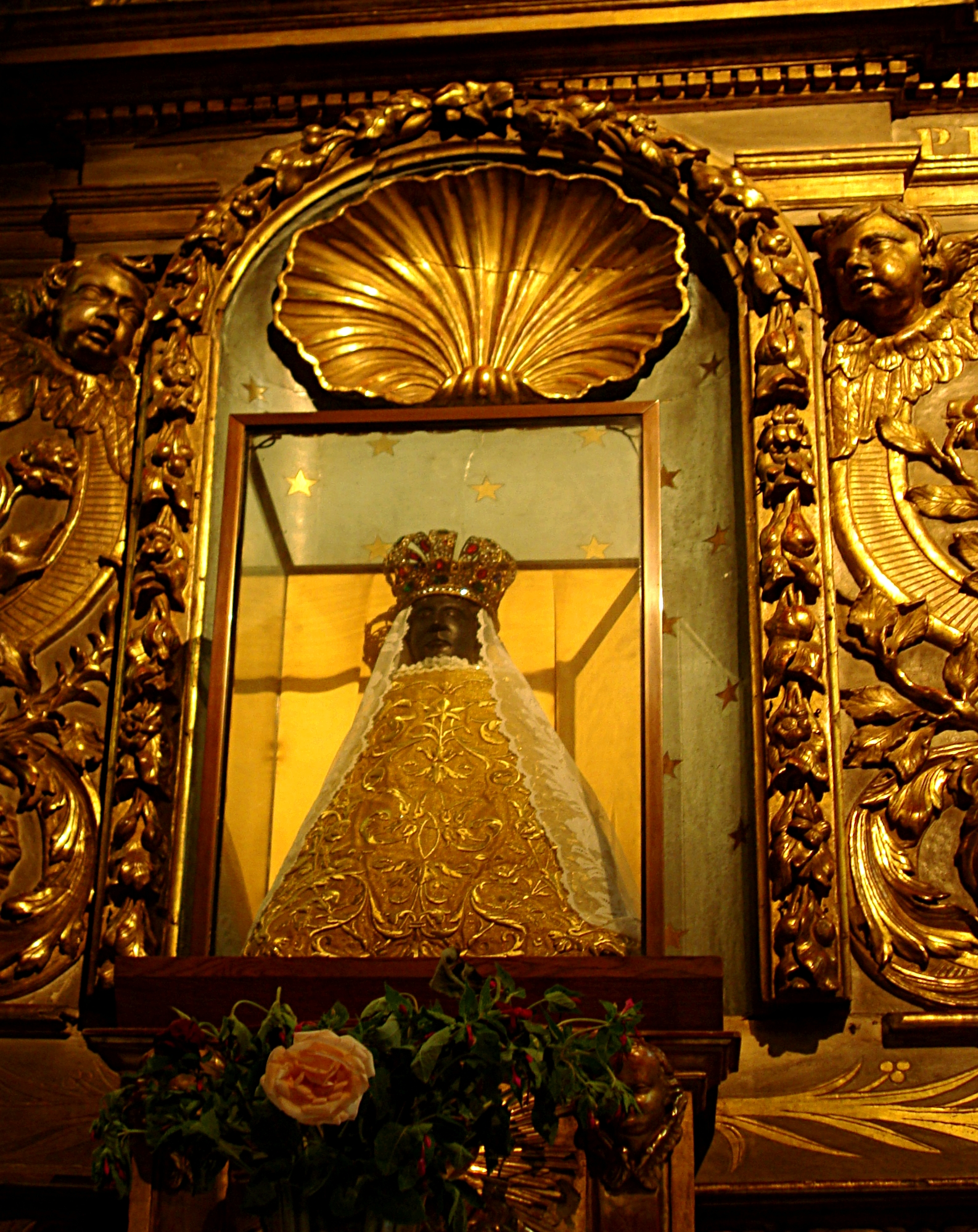
The Black Madonna venerated in the Cathedral.
