= Hôtel de Ville, Alès =

Town hall in Alès, France

Hôtel de Ville
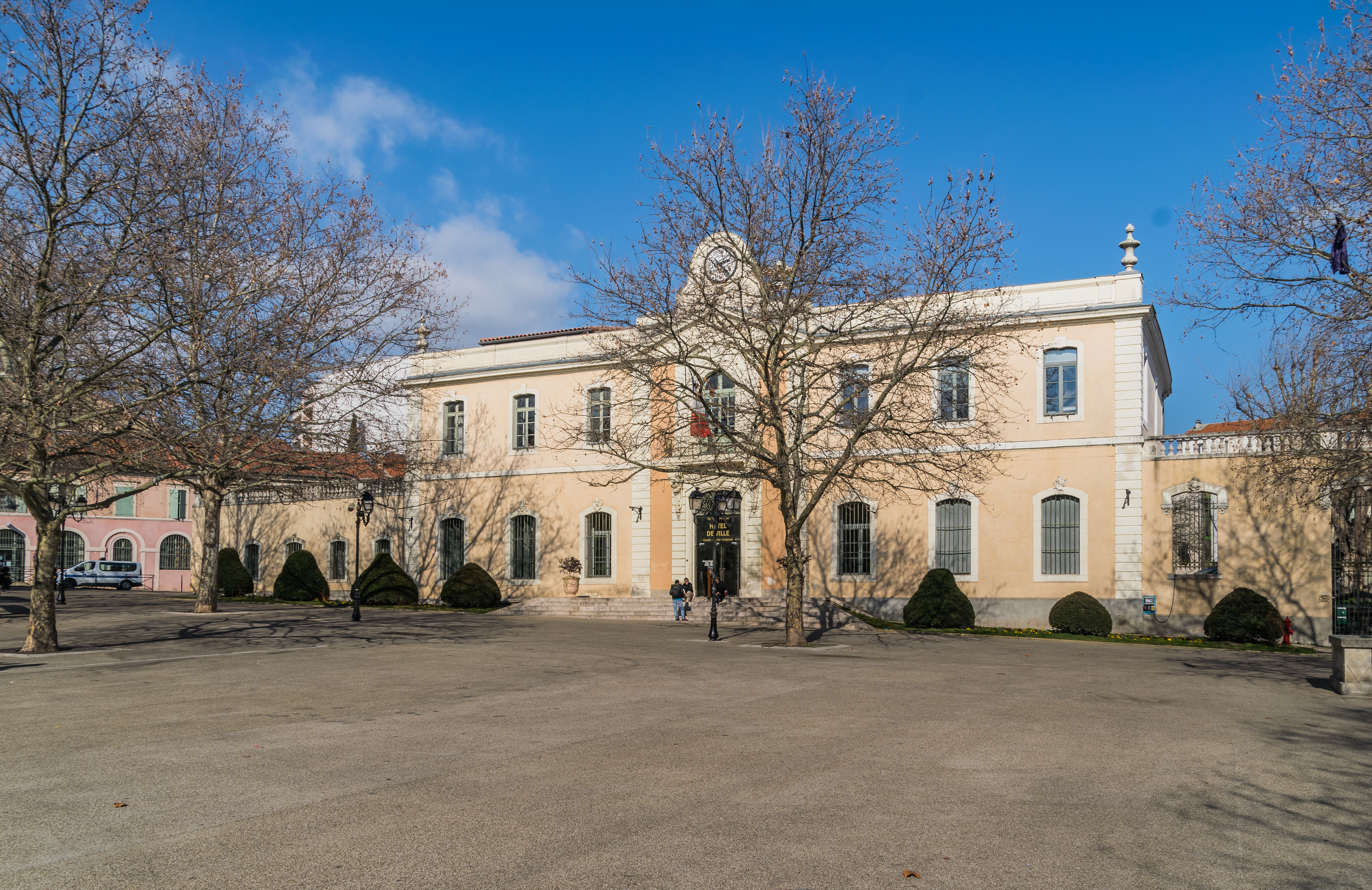
- The main frontage of the Hôtel de Ville in February 2019

General information
- Type: City hall
- Architectural style: Neoclassical style
- Location: Alès, France
- Coordinates: 44.1251°N 4.0775°E
- Completed: 1755

Design and construction
- Architect: Guillaume Rollin

Monument historique
- Official name: Hôtel de ville
- Type: Inscrit
- Designated: 1963
- Reference no.: PA00102950

The Hôtel de Ville (French pronunciation: [otɛl də vil], City Hall) is a municipal building in Alès, Gard, in southern France, standing on Place de l'Hôtel de Ville. It was designated a monument historique by the French government in 1963.

== History ==
The consuls met in a house near one of the city gates in the Middle Ages. After relocating to a building on the Grand-Rue in the early 16th century, they had occupied a room on the east side of Rue Soubeiranne by 1534. They then moved to a building on Rue Saint-Vincent, just behind the Abbey of Saint-Bernard, in July 1682.

In 1732, after the property was deemed cramped, not least because it was also being used as the meeting place of the diocesan assembly, the consuls decided to commission a proper town hall. The project was jointly financed by the consuls and the diocese. Following a flood in 1741, progress was slow, but construction was underway by 1750. The new building was designed by Guillaume Rollin in the neoclassical style, built by Jean Saussines in ashlar stone and was externally complete by 1752. Following internal decoration, the building was officially opened on 24 July 1755.

The design involved a symmetrical main frontage of seven bays facing Place de l'Hôtel de Ville. The central bay featured a segmental headed doorway with a moulded surround and a keystone. The doorway was flanked by rocailles supporting a balcony and there was a round headed French door with a moulded surround on the first floor. The central bay was flanked by full-height pilasters supporting an open pediment containing carvings, behind which, there was a small bell tower. The other bays were fenestrated by segmental headed windows with stone surrounds and masks on the ground floor and by segmental headed windows with stone surrounds and keystones on the first floor. At roof level, there was a parapet and, at the corners, there were quoins and finials. Internally, the principal room was the Salle des États du Languedoc (Room of the Estates of Languedoc), which was richly decorated with chandeliers and mirrors.

During the French Revolution the town hall became dilapidated, and urgent repairs were completed by a local mason, Raimond Roque, in 1806. The bell tower was replaced by a clock supported by scrolls in 1859. After the liberation of the town by troops of the French Forces of the Interior on 21 August 1944, during the Second World War, André Bruguerolle and Marcel Cassagne were sent as scouts on behalf of the local resistance commander, Marcel Bruguier (known by his pseudonym "Audibert"), to take possession of the town hall.

A stained glass window installed on the staircase was the work of the local artist, Pierre André Benoit, active in the post-war era until his death in 1993. An administrative services building, known as Mairie Prim, was designed in the modern style, built in concrete and glass and was opened on Rue Michelet in 2007.
