= Louis-François de Bausset =

French cardinal and writer

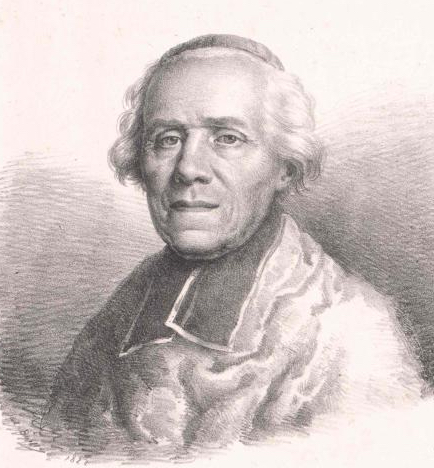
Louis-François de Bausset

Louis-François de Bausset (14 December 1748 – 21 June 1824) was a French cardinal, writer and member of the Académie française.

He was Vicar-General of the Diocese of Aix and Digne before being nominated a bishop.

He was nominated Bishop of Alais (or Alès) by King Louis XVI on 23 February 1784, and received approval from Pope Pius VI on 25 June 1784. He resigned the diocese in 1801, at the request of Pope Pius VII, who had entered into the Concordat of 1801 with First Consul Napoleon Bonaparte. The Concordat called for the reorganization of the episcopate in France, and the Pope had asked all bishops, pre- and post- Revolutionary, to resign in order to allow him a free hand.

He was born in Pondicherry, and died in Paris.

== Bibliography ==
- Bausset, Louis François de (1830). Histoire de J.-B. Bossuet, évéque de Meaux, 1 (in French) (5th ed.). Chez Gauthier frère et Cie. pp. ix–xliv.
- Dessolle, Gérard (2006). Le cardinal Louis-François de Bausset, 1748-1824: le pouvoir de la modération (in French). Digne: Association pour l'étude et la sauvegarde du patrimoine religieux de la Haute-Provence.
- Ritzler, Remigius; Sefrin, Pirminus (1958). Hierarchia catholica medii et recentis aevi VI (1730-1799). Patavii: Messagero di S. Antonio..
