= Germigny-l'Exempt =

Germigny-l’Exempt
- Commune
- Location of Germigny-l’Exempt
- Location within France Location within Centre-Val de Loire
- Coordinates: 46°55′05″N 2°53′52″E
- Country: France
- Region: Centre-Val de Loire
- Department: Cher
- Arrondissement: Saint-Amand-Montrond
- Canton: La Guerche-sur-l'Aubois

Government
  - Mayor (2020–2026): Olivier Beatrix
- Area^{1}: 28.26 km^{2} (10.91 sq mi)
- Elevation: 200 m (660 ft)
- Highest elevation: 227 m (745 ft)
- Lowest elevation: 180 m (590 ft)
- Population (2023): 293
  - Density: 10.4/km^{2} (26.9/sq mi)
- Time zone: UTC+01:00 (CET)
  - Summer (DST): UTC+02:00 (CEST)
- INSEE/Postal code: 18101 /18150
- ^{1} French Land Register data, which excludes lakes, ponds, glaciers > 1 km^{2} (0.386 sq mi or 247 acres) and river estuaries.

Germigny-l’Exempt (French pronunciation: [ʒɛʁmiɲi lɛɡzɑ̃]) is a commune in the central French department of Cher.

== Geography ==
A farming area comprising the village and a couple of hamlets situated by the banks of the small Luisant river some 24 miles (39 km) southeast of Bourges at the junction of departmental routes D100, D15, D78, D43.

== Population ==
Historical population
Year	Pop.	±% p.a.
1968	509	—
1975	472	−1.07%
1982	383	−2.94%
1990	362	−0.70%
1999	331	−0.99%
2007	320	−0.42%
2012	320	+0.00%
2017	307	−0.83%
2023	293	−0.77%
Source: INSEE

== Sights ==
- The twelfth-century church of Notre-Dame, with its exceptionally tall tower-porch, was built after the siege of 1108 by Louis VI the Fat as a symbol of the Capetian « Pax Dei ». The inconographic program of its inner portal of 1215 is inherited from the north porch of the west portal of two churches: Laon Cathedral and the abbey church in Saint-Gilles du Gard. The tympanum showing a Sedes Sapientiae is meant to celebrate the triumph of the Church (the Virgin being symbolic of the Church) upon heretics who reject the real presence in the eucharist.
- The chateau of Château-Renaud, dating from the seventeenth century.

== See also ==
- Communes of the Cher department

== Bibliography ==
- Legeard, Emmanuel (2022). Germigny-l'Exempt ou les Trois Deniers de Gaspard [Germigny-l'Exempt or Gaspard's three coins] (in French). Paris: L'Harmattan. ISBN 978-2-14-027811-2.
