= Vissec =

- Commune
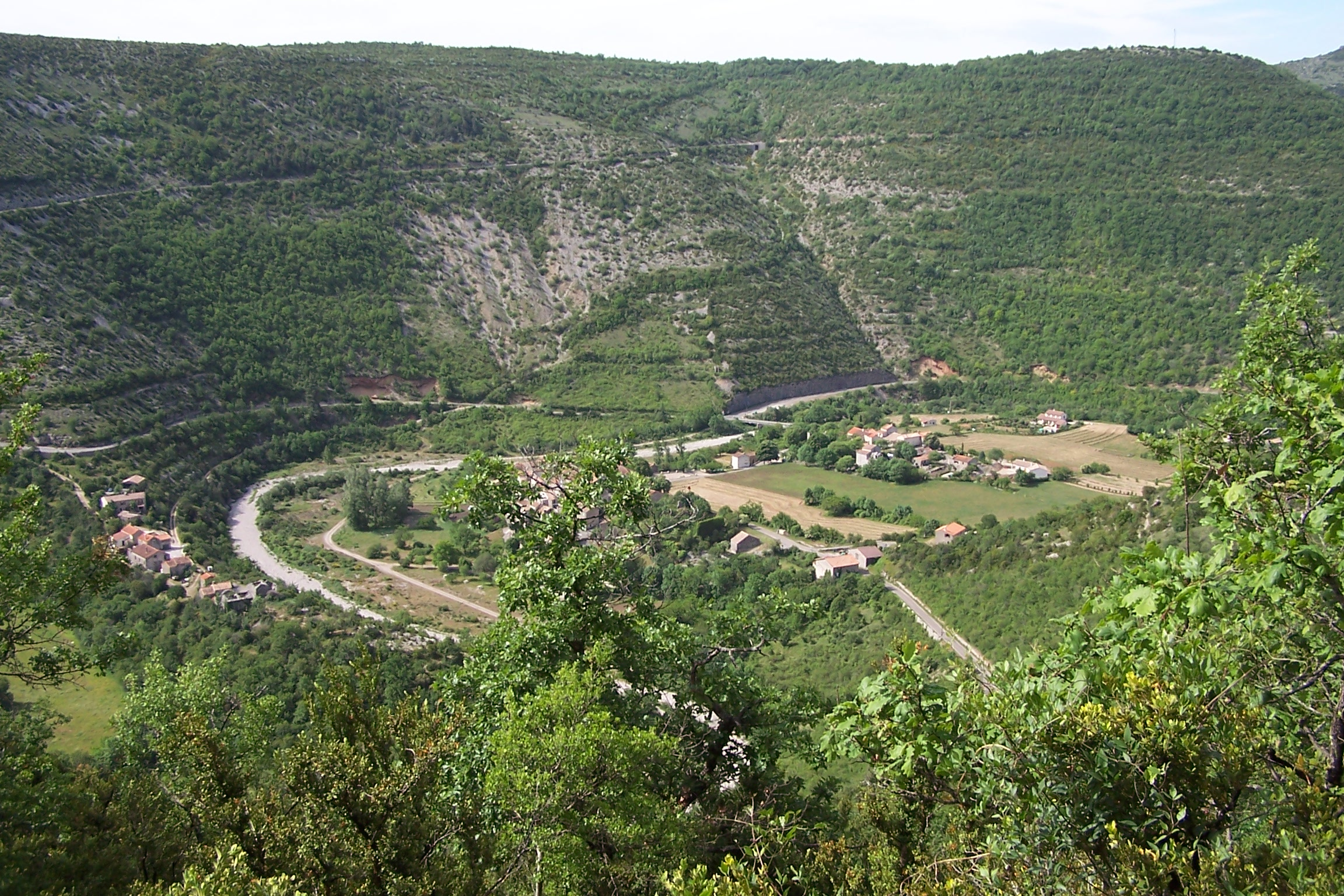
- Aerial view

- Coat of arms
- Location of Vissec
- Location within France Location within Occitanie
- Coordinates: 43°54′02″N 3°27′35″E
- Country: France
- Region: Occitania
- Department: Gard
- Arrondissement: Le Vigan
- Canton: Le Vigan
- Intercommunality: Pays Viganais

Government
  - Mayor (2020–2026): Laurent Pons
- Area^{1}: 21.83 km^{2} (8.43 sq mi)
- Elevation: 400 m (1,300 ft)
- Highest elevation: 793 m (2,602 ft)
- Lowest elevation: 340 m (1,120 ft)
- Population (2023): 68
  - Density: 3.1/km^{2} (8.1/sq mi)
- Time zone: UTC+01:00 (CET)
  - Summer (DST): UTC+02:00 (CEST)
- INSEE/Postal code: 30353 /30770
- ^{1} French Land Register data, which excludes lakes, ponds, glaciers > 1 km^{2} (0.386 sq mi or 247 acres) and river estuaries.

Vissec (French pronunciation: [visɛk]; Languedocien: Virsec) is a commune in the Gard department in southern France.

== Population ==
Historical population
Year	Pop.	±% p.a.
1968	46	—
1975	40	−1.98%
1982	50	+3.24%
1990	50	+0.00%
1999	43	−1.66%
2007	49	+1.65%
2012	54	+1.96%
2017	60	+2.13%
2023	68	+2.11%
Source: INSEE

== See also ==
- Château de Vissec
- Vis River
- Communes of the Gard department
