= List of bibliographies of works on Catullus =

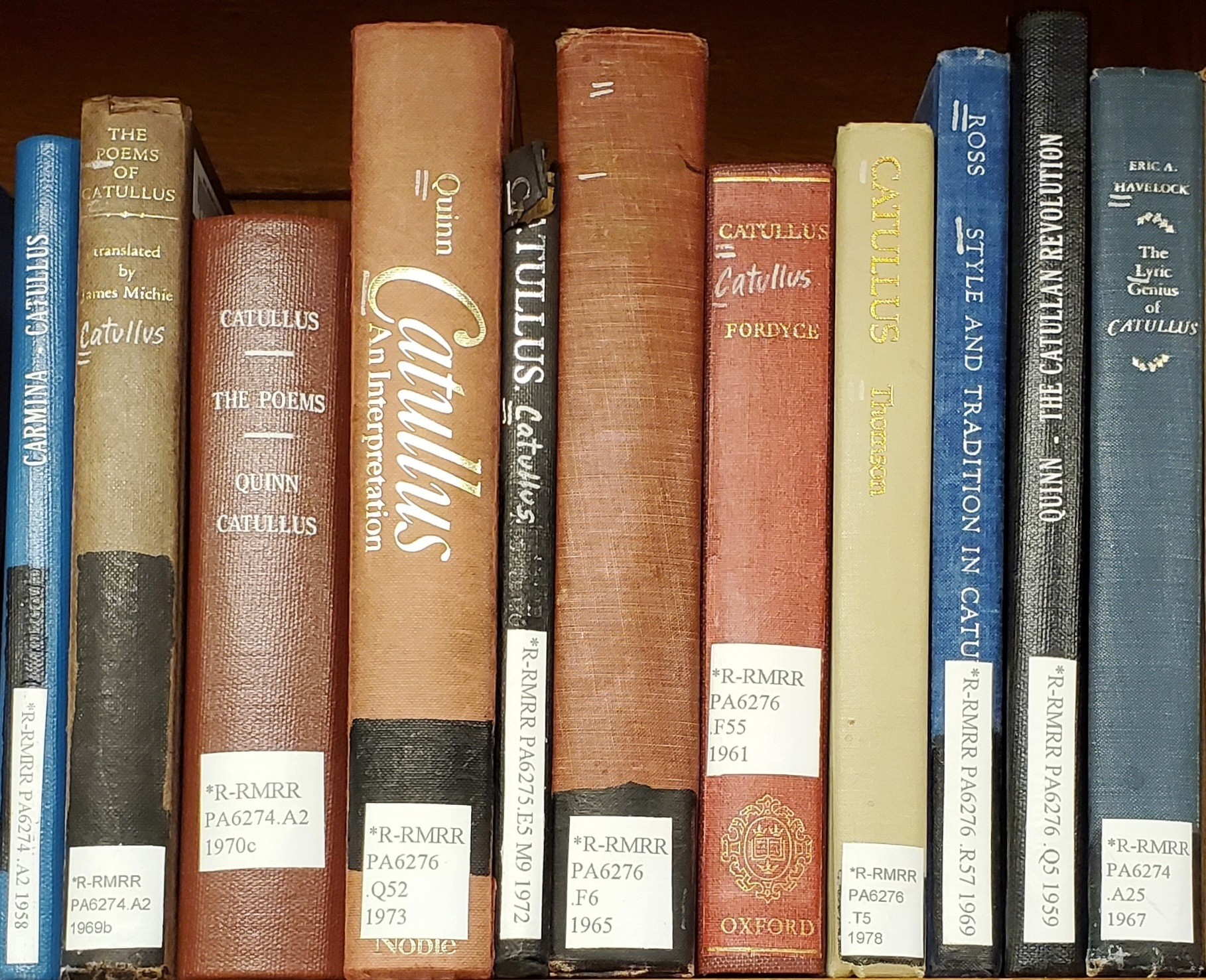
Bibliographies are helpful tools to identify books about Catullus.

Gaius Valerius Catullus (c. 84 – c. 54 BCE) was a Latin poet and a leading figure of the Neoterics. Catullus and his poetry, comprising 113 poems, have been the subjects of many books and papers in classical studies and other fields, including literary criticism, gender studies, and cultural studies; there are many critical editions, commentaries, translations and student guides of his poetry as well. Even in 1890, Max Bonnet wrote that Catullus was "inundated" with academic publications concerning his life and works. In the early 1970s, Kenneth Quinn wrote, "Scarcely an issue appears of any of the major classical periodicals without at least one article on Catullus; new translations come out almost yearly". More than two thousand publications about Catullus appeared between 1959 and 2003. Denis Feeney has described Catullus 68 alone as having "legions of critics", producing a "labyrinth" of literature. The main bibliographic reference for classical studies is L'Année philologique, a journal founded by Jules Marouzeau; each volume contains a list of works published on Catullus that year. However, expert guidance via specific bibliographies and survey articles remains useful as this index can be inconvenient to use. Curated bibliographies are still important resources even with the rise of online search tools such as Google Scholar. Various bibliographies and literature reviews have attempted to systematically cover books, chapters, articles, dissertations, and other research about Catullus and his poetry to help students and scholars find their way through the literature.

Conrad Bursian's Jahresbericht über die Fortschritte der klassischen Altertumswissenschaft was a journal known for its articles reviewing work on classical authors or topics; German classicists such as Richard Richter, Hugo Magnus, and Hans Rubenbauer contributed several surveys of Catullan studies over the course of the journal's publication in the late 19th and early 20th centuries. R. G. C. Levens's chapter "Catullus" in Fifty Years of Classical Scholarship and Jean Granarolo's article "Où en sont nos connaissances sur Catulle?" in L'Information littéraire both overviewed the state of Catullan scholarship up through the 1950s, prior to R. A. B. Mynors's influential edition for Oxford Classical Texts. The 1958 publication of Mynors's text marked the start of a resurgence of scholarship of Catullus continuing through 1970. The period 1934–1969 in Catullan research is covered by a pair of articles in The Classical World; this journal is known for its bibliographic reports. Quinn's "Trends in Catullan Criticism" was published in the book series Aufstieg und Niedergang der römischen Welt in 1973; this series mostly comprises survey articles, with many devoted to reviews of scholarship on Roman authors. Lustrum, a review journal devoted to comprehensive surveys of classical scholarship, published surveys by Granarolo in 1976 and 1987. The 1970s and 1980s also marked the appearance of two bibliographic books on Catullus: one by Hermann Harrauer in 1979 and another by James P. Holoka in 1985. Marilyn B. Skinner's 270-page article for Lustrum covers 1985–2015, picking up from Granarolo's earlier publications for the journal; T. P. Wiseman included Skinner's survey as one of a handful of "standard works of Catullan reference". Several Catullan bibliographies exist online; these online resources can be continually updated unlike those in print. David Konstan, a compiler of Oxford Bibliographies Online's bibliography of Catullus, wrote "in the future, online bibliographies [...] will be the rule".

Various kinds of references have been included alongside self-contained bibliographies and research reports on Catullus. Some bibliographies are on related subjects such as Lesbia (a major character in many of Catullus's poems, generally thought to be a pseudonym for Clodia) or the Codex Traguriensis (a 15th-century manuscript in the Bibliothèque nationale de France containing Catullus's poetry); others are on broader topics such as Roman elegy, meter, or Latin literature as a whole. Certain books on Catullus have had their references identified as being particularly useful from a bibliographic point of view. Tertiary sources such as Mauriz Schuster's entry in Paulys Realencyclopädie der classischen Altertumswissenschaft also have been cited for their review of past scholarship. Items are added to this list only if other sources have specifically cited them within broader metabibliographic discussion of bibliographies and research surveys of Catullus.

== Print ==
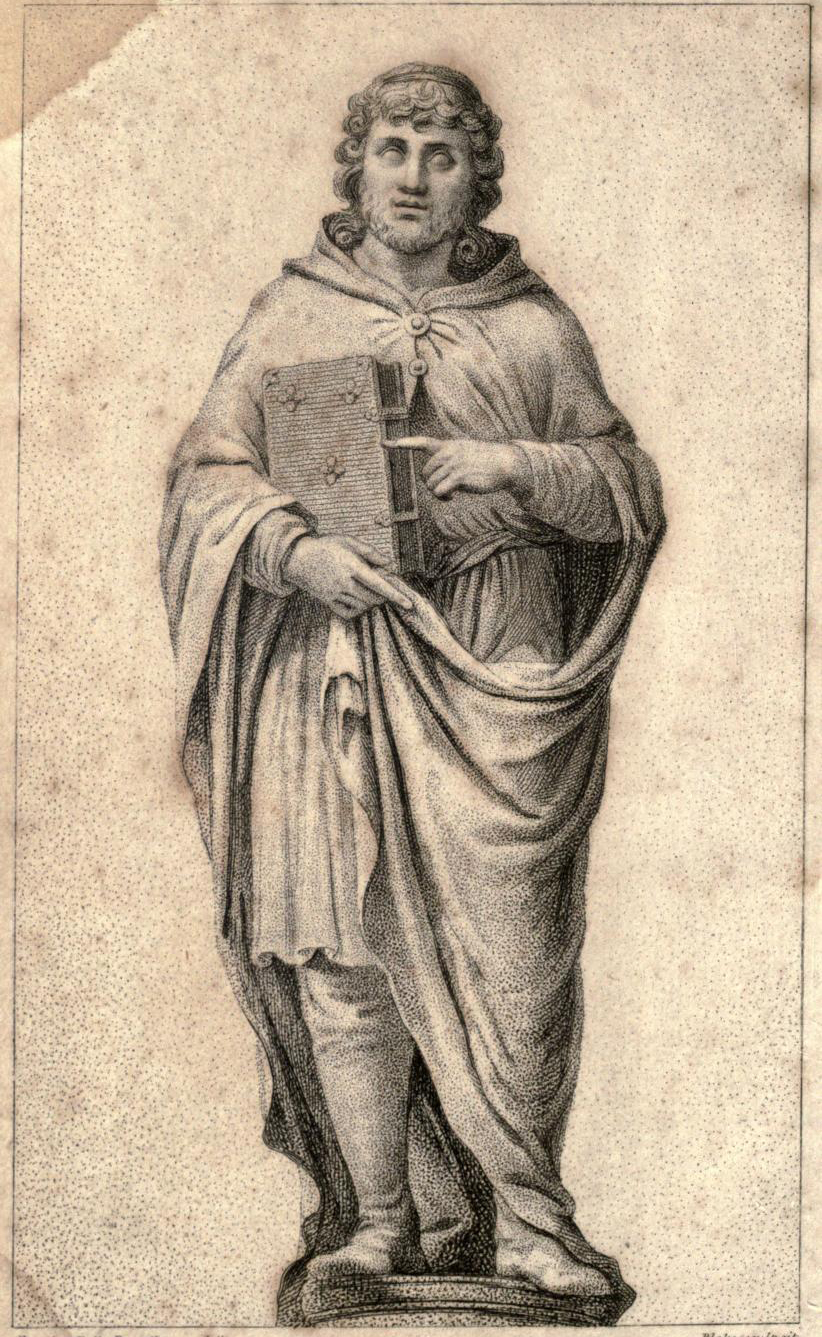
William Blake's frontispiece to a 1795 edition of Catullus's poetry, depicting the poet

=== 1870s–1890s ===
- Richter, Richard [in German] (1873). "Jahresbericht über Catull, Tibull, Properz". Jahresbericht über die Fortschritte der classischen Altertumswissenschaft (in German). 2: 1447–1454.
  Survey of ten publications about Catullus, Tibullus, and Propertius, published 1873–1874, mostly about textual criticism.
- Magnus, Hugo [in German] (1876). "Zur Litteratur des Catullus". Neue Jahrbücher für Philologie und Paedagogik (in German). 113: 402–414.
  Discusses Emil Baehrens's Analecta Catulliana and Rudolf Peiper's Q. Valerius Catullus: Beiträge zur Kritik seiner Gedichte.
- Richter, Richard (1876). "Bericht über Catull und die auf Catull, Tibull, Properz gemeinsam bezüglichen Schriften für die Jahre 1874, 1875 und 1876". Jahresbericht über die Fortschritte der classischen Altertumswissenschaft (in German). 6: 300–335.
  Lists 38 publications, discussion accompanies many but not all of them. Mostly about Catullus, including editions, translations, and scholarship on meter and structure.
- Magnus, Hugo (1887). "Bericht über die Litteratur zu Catull und Tibull für die Jahre 1877–1886". Jahresbericht über die Fortschritte der classischen Altertumswissenschaft (in German). 51: 145–372 [145–300].
  Has separate sections for Catullus and Tibullus with 226 entries between them. Each section is divided into subsections.
- Magnus, Hugo (1898). "Bericht über die Litteratur zu Catull für die Jahre 1887–1896". Jahresbericht über die Fortschritte der classischen Altertumswissenschaft (in German). 97: 190–219.
  ——— (1899). "Bericht über die Litteratur zu Catull für die Jahre 1887–1896". Jahresbericht über die Fortschritte der classischen Altertumswissenschaft (in German). 101: 84–141.
  First part includes more general publications; second includes works on specific parts of Catullan scholarship, for instance textual criticism, meter, or language.
- Gleditsch, H. (1899). "Jahresbericht über die Erscheinungen auf dem Gebiete der griechischen und römischen Metrik". Jahresbericht über die Fortschritte der classischen Altertumswissenschaft (in German). 102: 1–64 [58–59].
  On Catullus and meter.

=== 1900s–1930s ===
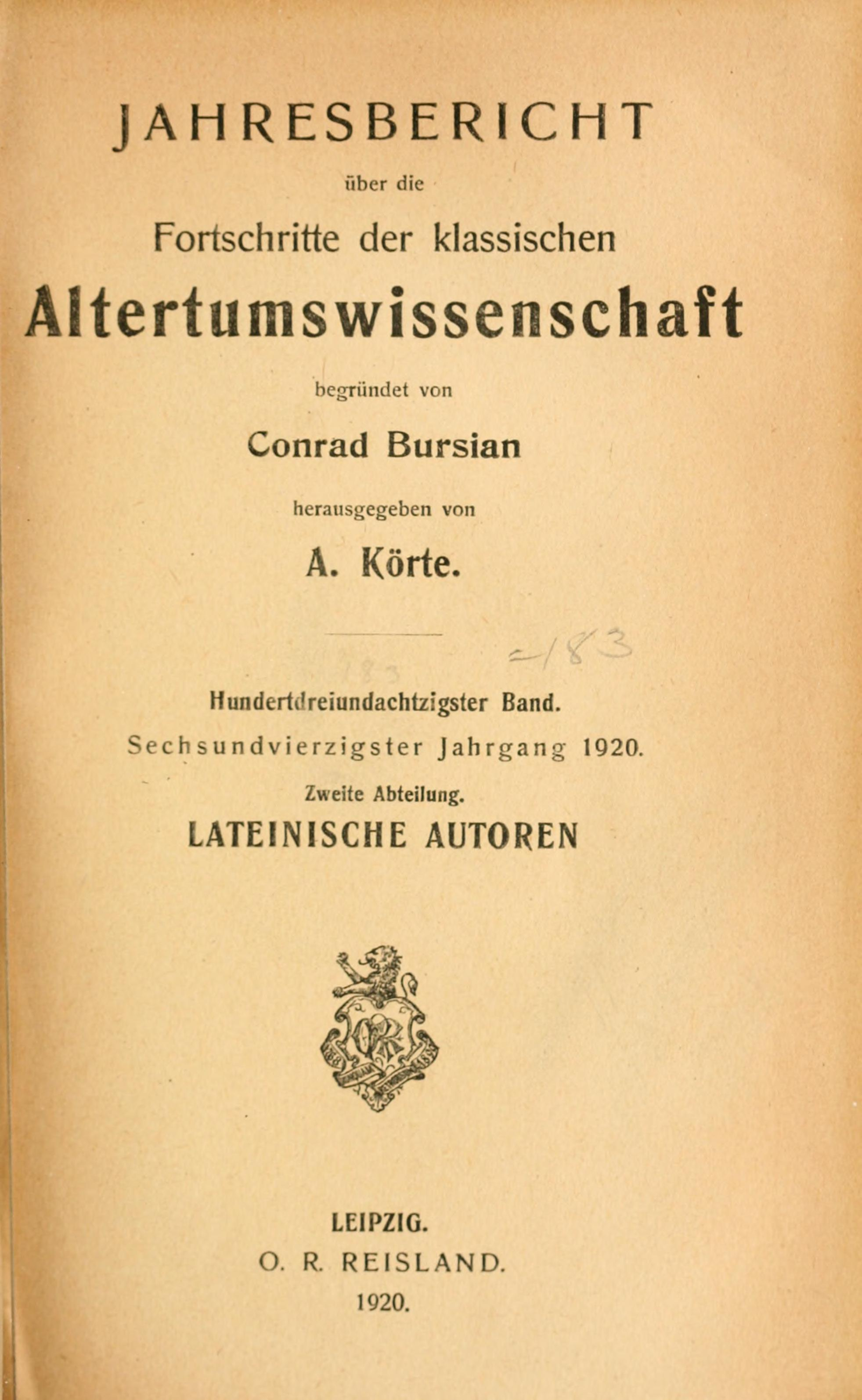
Many early Catullan surveys appeared in Jahresbericht über die Fortschritte der klassischen Altertumswissenschaft.

- Magnus, Hugo (1905). "Bericht über die Literatur zu Catullus für die Jahre 1897–1904". Jahresbericht über die Fortschritte der klassischen Altertumswissenschaft (in German). 126: 108–148.
  Divided into two sections: the first part includes more general publications and the second includes works on specific parts of Catullan scholarship.
- Gruppe, Otto (1908). "Catull". Bericht über die Literatur zur antiken Mythologie und Religionsgeschichte aus den Jahren 1898–1905. Jahresbericht über die Fortschritte der klassischen Altertumswissenschaft: Supplementband (in German). Vol. 137. pp. 165–167.
  On Catullus and religion.
- Schulze, K. P. (1920). "Bericht über die Literatur zu Catullus für Jahre 1905–1920". Jahresbericht über die Fortschritte der klassischen Altertumswissenschaft (in German). 183: 1–72.
  First part of the survey includes editions, and scholarship on meter, biographies of Catullus, and textual criticism; the second part is about research on the language and grammar in Catullus's works.
- Rubenbauer, Hans [in German] (1927). "Bericht über die Literatur zu Catullus für die Jahre 1920–1925/26". Jahresbericht über die Fortschritte der klassischen Altertumswissenschaft (in German). 212: 169–214. hdl:2027/mdp.39015030982543.
  Survey comprises four sections, compiling general works, editions, translations, and scholarship on individual poems.
- Schanz, Martin; Hosius, Carl [in German] (1927). "C. Valerius Catullus". Geschichte der römischen Literatur bis zum Gesetzgebungswerk des Kaisers Justinian. Teil I. Die römische Literature in der Zeit der Republik. Handbuch der Altertumswissenschaft (in German). Vol. VIII.1 (4th ed.). München: C. H. Beck. pp. 292–307. hdl:2027/wu.89013503776.
  Contemporary book reviews praised its "astonishing bibliography" which were "the most useful parts of the book". Covers literature to c. 1927.
- Bickel, Ernst (1937). "Elegie und Epigram, Idyll, Lied und Gedicht: Catull". Lehrbuch der Geschichte der römischen Literatur. Bibliothek der klassischen Altertumswissenschaften (in German). Vol. VIII. Heidelberg: Winter. pp. 523–533.
  Bibliographic information appears throughout; references to predominantly German scholarship appear in running text. Covers literature to c. 1937.

=== 1940s–1950s ===
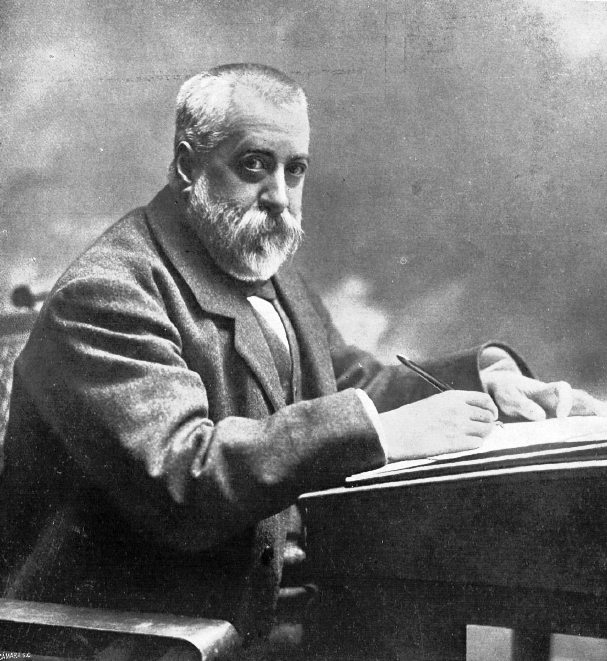
Marcelino Menéndez y Pelayo's Bibliografía hispano–latina clásica was later published as part of the series Edición nacional de las obras completas de Menéndez Pelayo.

- Herescu, N. I. (1943). "Catullus". Bibliographie de la littérature latine (in French). Paris: Les Belles Lettres. pp. 45–49.
  Has publications up through 1940.
- Bignone, Ettore (1945). "Bibliografia: C. Valerio Catullo". La prosa romana sino all'età di Cesare, Lucilio, Lucrezio, Catullo. Storia della letteratura latina (in Italian). Vol. 2. Florence: Sansoni. pp. 463–467.
  Appendix to a chapter on Catullus (pp. 343–426) within a series on Roman literature. Bibliography largely focuses on the prior fifty years. Sections: "Edizioni", "Studi", "Su Lesbia", "Sui singoli carmi: a proposito del cc. 61 e 62", "Su altre poesie", "Sulla lingua, sullo stile e sulla metrica", and "Sulla fortuna".
- Fuchs, Harald [in German] (1947). "Rückschau und Ausblick im Arbeitsbereich der lateinischen Philologie". Museum Helveticum (in German). 4 (3): 147–198 [180–181]. JSTOR 24811418.
  Bibliographic paper with 120 footnotes overall. Discussion on Catullus includes sources related to Catullus 51 and Sappho, as well as Catullus 66 and Callimachus.
- Schuster, Mauriz [in German] (1948). "C. Valerius Catullus". Paulys Realencyclopädie der classischen Altertumswissenschaft (in German). Vol. VII A, 2. Stuttgart: Alfred Druckenmüller. cols. 2353–2410.
  Contains "substantial bibliographical data". Covers literature through c. 1944.
- Braga, Domenico (1950). "Catullo (1938–1948)". Doxa (in Italian). 3. Tumminelli: 161–190.
  Contains discussion and critique. In five sections: "1. Biografia e cronologia", "2. Edizioni e traduzioni", "3. Commento ai carmi", "4. Lingua e stile", and "5. Tecnica poetica e modelli letterari".
- Menéndez Pelayo, Marcelino (1950). "Catulo". In Sánchez Reyes, Enrique (ed.). Bibliografía hispano–latina clásica: II (Catulo–Cicerón...). Edición nacional de las obras completas de Menéndez Pelayo (in Spanish). Vol. 45. Madrid: Santander. pp. 7–100.
  Includes a list of Spanish translations of Catullus. Section on Catullus largely the same as original 1902 publication, with some editing and a couple entries Menéndez y Pelayo had subsequently compiled.
- Büchner, Karl [in German] (1951). "Catull und die römische Elegie". In Büchner, Karl; Hofmann, J. B. [in German] (eds.). Lateinische Literatur und Sprache in der Forschung seit 1937. Wissenschaftliche Forschungsberichte. Geisteswissenschaftliche Reihe (in German). Vol. 6. Berne: Francke. pp. 33–49 [33–41].
  Part of Büchner's larger report reviewing scholarship on Roman literature from 1937–c. 1949, largely focusing on work written in German. This chapter about elegiac poetry has sections on Catullus, Cornelius Gallus, Tibullus, Propertius, and Ovid.
- Levens, R. G. C. (1954). "Catullus". In Platnauer, Maurice (ed.). Fifty Years of Classical Scholarship. Oxford: Basil Blackwell. pp. 284–305.
  Surveys scholarship from the beginning of the 20th century through c. 1953. Divided into six sections: "Editions"; "Translations"; "Biography"; "Literary History and Criticism"; "Manuscripts and Text"; "Language, Metre and Style". Summarizes conclusions of studies and also gives his own criticisms and evaluations of them. Unrevised, without update, in the second edition; a photographic reprint using this pagination appears in Quinn's Approaches to Catullus.
- Ferrero, Leonardo (1955). "Note". Interpretazione di Catullo (in Italian). Torino: Rosenberg & Sellier. pp. 425–454.
  Wendell Clausen's review of this book said, "Perhaps the most valuable [...] part of the book is the detailed bibliography".
- Granarolo, Jean (1956). "Où en sont nos connaissances sur Catulle?". L'Information littéraire (in French). 8 (2): 56–65.
  Discusses change in research trends from 19th to 20th centuries, such as an increased emphasis of Catullus's personality. Sections include: "Texte", "Le recueil", "Dualité ou unité?", "Caritas, fides et fœdus", "Catulle était-il un mystique?", "Hellénisme ou romanité?", and "Problèmes de facture". Photographically reprinted in Quinn's Approaches to Catullus.
- Schuster, Mauriz; Eisenhut, W. [in German], eds. (1958). Catulli Veronensis Liber (in Latin) (Corr. of 2nd ed.). Leipzig: Teubner.
  Has a bibliography ("Conspectus siglorum et notarum", pp. XV–XVIII) as well as bibliographies accompanying each poem. Bibliographies focus on sources pertaining to interpretation.
- Horváth István Károly [in Hungarian] (1959). "Korszakok és irányok a Catullus-filológia történetében" [Époques et tendances dans l'histoire des recherches sur Catulle] (PDF). Antik Tanulmányok: Studia Antiqua (in Hungarian). 6: 123–135. Archived (PDF) from the original on 29 October 2022.
- Puccioni, Giulio (1959). "La poesia di Catullo nella critica recente". Annuario 1949–1959 del Liceo-Ginnasio G. Carducci di Viareggio (in Italian). Pisa: Giardini: 54–77.

=== 1960s ===
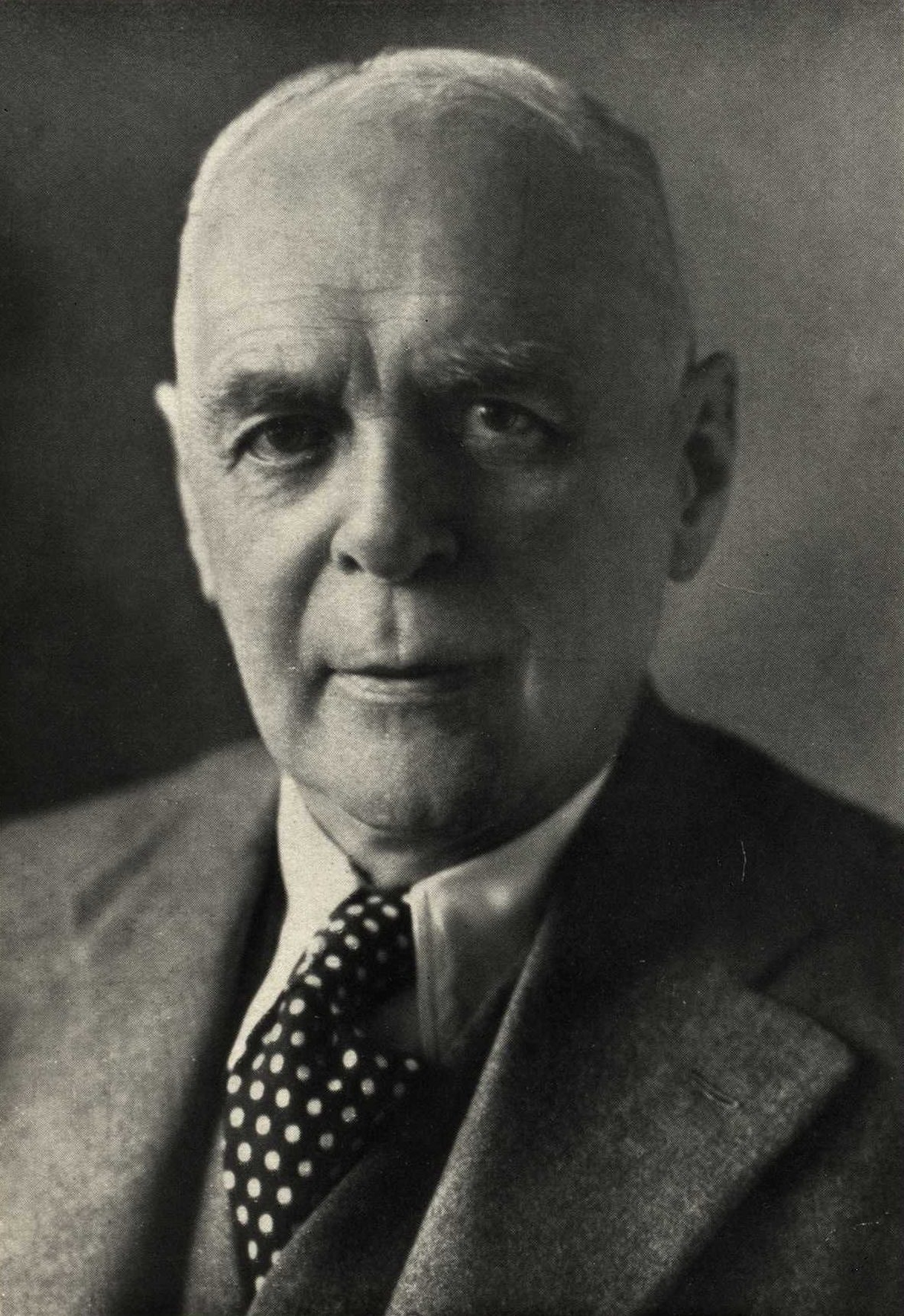
C. Valerius Catullus, edited by Wilhelm Kroll (pictured), includes a bibliography by J. Kroymann in later editions.

- Leon, Harry J. (1960). "A Quarter Century of Catullan Scholarship (1934–1959)". The Classical World. 53 (4): 104–113. doi:10.2307/4344282. JSTOR 4344282.
  ——— (1960). "A Quarter Century of Catullan Scholarship (1934–1959), II". The Classical World. 53 (5): 141–148. doi:10.2307/4344302. JSTOR 4344302.
  ——— (1960). "A Quarter Century of Catullan Scholarship (1934–1959), III". The Classical World. 53 (6): 173–180. doi:10.2307/4344322. JSTOR 4344322.
  ——— (1960). "A Quarter Century of Catullan Scholarship (1934–1959): Supplement". The Classical World. 53 (9): 281–282. doi:10.2307/4344392. JSTOR 4344392.
  Arranged by topic, with summaries and commentary. Sections include "Bibliographical Materials"; "Editions and Translations"; "Manuscript Studies"; "General Works on Catullus"; "Chronology of the Life and Writings of Catullus"; "The Circle of Catullus"; "Catullus and Earlier Writers: (Greek; Roman)"; "Influence on Later Writers"; "Studies on Meter", "Language and Style"; and "The Individual Poems". A supplement includes works Leon subsequently became aware of.
- Ooteghem, J. van (1961). "Supplément à la Bibliotheca graeca et latina (1946–1960)". Les Études Classiques (in French). 29 (1): 3–107 [71–73]. Archived (PDF) from the original on 18 November 2022.
  Supplement to Bibliotheca graeca et latina; (Note: Ooteghem, J. van (1946). "Catulle". Bibliotheca graeca et latina: À l'usage des professeurs des humanités gréco-latines (in French) (2nd ed.). Namur: Éditions de la revue "Les Études Classiques". pp. 257–260. First edition published across several volumes of Les Études Classiques. On Catullus: Ooteghem, J. van (1936). "Bibliotheca Latina". Les Études Classiques (in French). 5 (2): 227–378 [238–240]. Archived (PDF) from the original on 10 January 2023.) sources are grouped into critical editions, commentaries, translations, dictionaries and studies, which are subdivided by topic. The third edition is the second edition with this supplement as an appendix.
- Traglia, Antonio (1961). "Catullo e i poeti nuovi nella critica più recente". Cultura e Scuola (in Italian). 1 (1): 41–47.
  Reviews books and articles on Catullus from the period 1945–1959; notes scholarship is beginning to focus on the relationship between Catullus and other Neoterics.
- "De Romeinse elegie (I)". Lampadion (in Dutch). 2 (4): 58–64. 1962.
  Review of ten publications 1951–1961 on Roman elegy; surveys, books, and recent articles each have their own sections.
- Nat, P. G. van der (1963). "Catullus (I)". Lampadion (in Dutch). 4 (1): 18–24.
  ——— (1963–1964). "Catullus (I)". Lampadion (in Dutch). 4 (2/3): 47–60.
  ——— (1964). "Catullus (I)". Lampadion (in Dutch). 5 (2): 32–48.
  Concerns the period 1950–1963. Separate sections for "Kronieken", "Edities, commentaren, vertalingen", "Boeken", and "Recente artikelen".
- Radke, Gerhard [in German] (1964). "Einige Catulliana". Fachbericht. Gymnasium (in German). 71 (5): 442–444.
  Reviews seven works: Léon Herrmann's 1957 edition of Catullus, five other editions of Catullus published between 1958 and 1963, and Kenneth Quinn's 1959 book The Catullan Revolution.
- Kroymann, J. (1968). "Bibliographie zu Catull für die Jahre 1929–1967". In Kroll, Wilhelm (ed.). C. Valerius Catullus (in German) (5th ed.). Stuttgart: B. G. Teubner. pp. 301–318.
  Arranged chronologically within various subject-based categories. Unannotated. Updated version of Kroymann's bibliographies for Kroll's earlier editions of Catullus.

=== 1970s ===
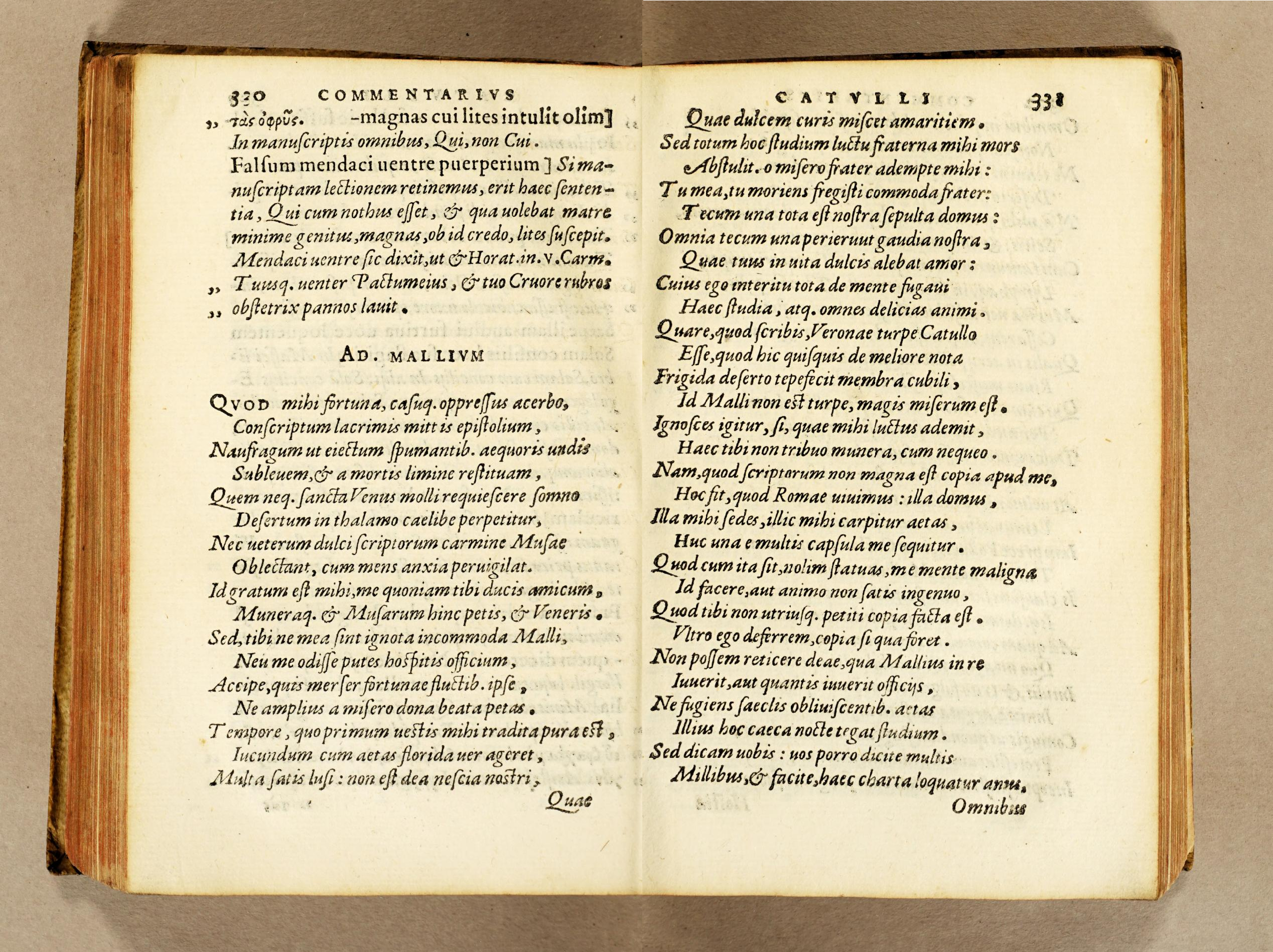
Wolfgang Hering's paper reviews research on Catullus 68, two pages of which are seen here in Achilles Statius's 1566 edition of Catullus's poetry.

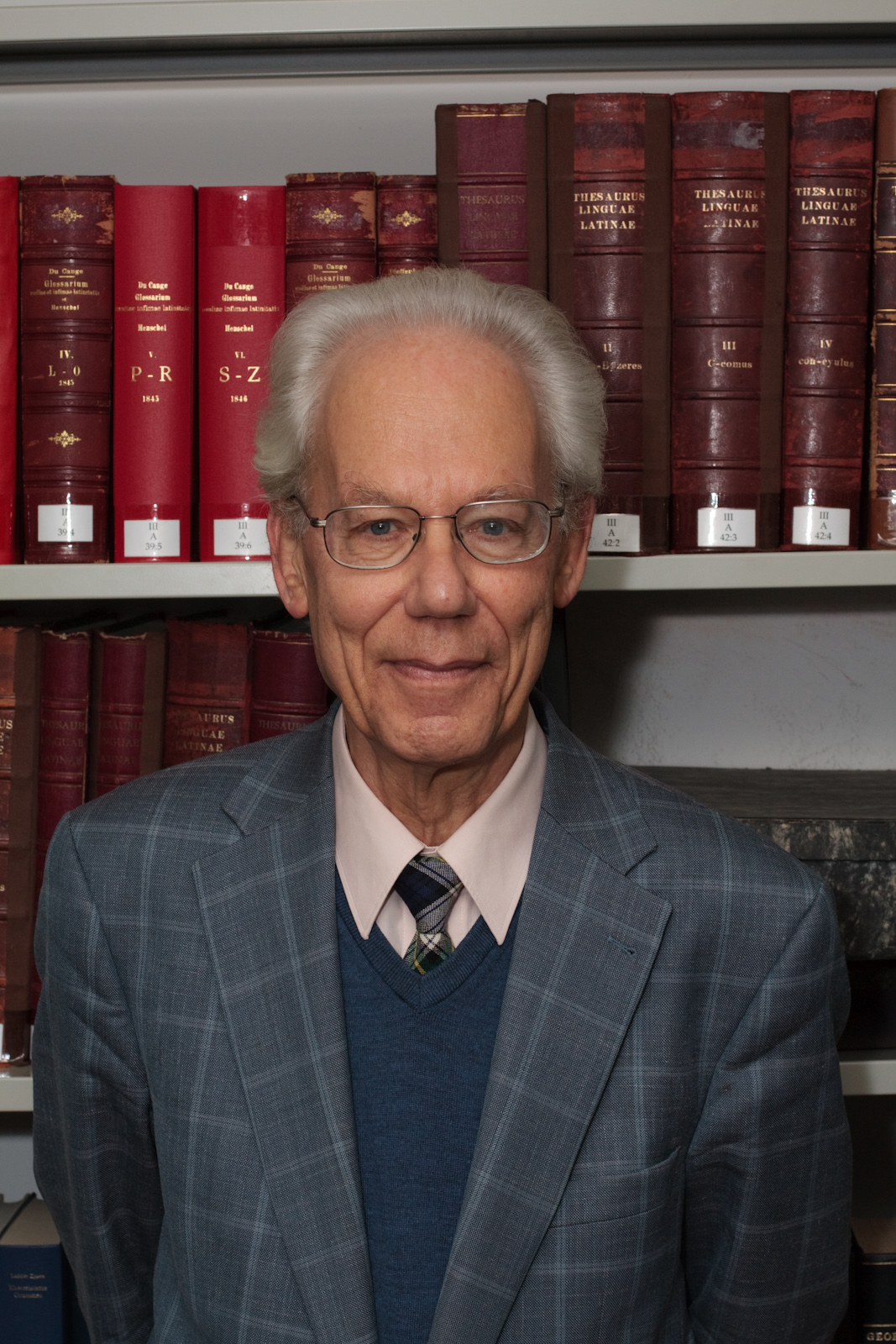
Rolf Heine edited a collection of papers about Catullus; his introduction to the book explores various trends in Catullan research.

- Fedeli, Paolo [in Italian] (1971). "Su alcune tendenze recenti della critica catulliana". Bollettino di Studi Latini (in Italian). 1 (3): 419–446.
  Focuses on six works published between 1967 and 1970, including Henry Bardon's 1970 edition of Catullus.
- Thomson, D. F. S. (1971). "Recent Scholarship on Catullus (1960–69)". The Classical World. 65 (4): 116–126. JSTOR 4347610.
  A continuation of Leon (1960). Includes 408 items, arranged by topic, with cursory summaries. Uses similar subject headings as Leon's survey. Includes a supplement with approximately 150 items which fall under the purview of Leon's survey.
- Smolenaars, J. J. L. (1971). "Catullus (II)". Lampas (in Dutch). 4 (1): 126–130. Archived from the original on 5 December 2022.
  ——— (1972). "Catullus (II) vervolg". Lampas (in Dutch). 5 (1): 84–96. Archived from the original on 19 December 2022.
  ——— (1972). "Catullus II (slot)". Lampas (in Dutch). 5 (2): 177–192. Archived from the original on 19 December 2022.
  A continuation of Van der Nat (1963–1964). It includes 135 entries with 1970 as its endpoint. Sections: "Kronieken", "Edities, commentaren, vertalingen", "Studies over aspecten van Catullus' poëzie" (subsections: "A. Algemene aspecten", "B. Tekstoverlevering en tekstkritiek", "C. Studies over taal, stijl en metriek", "D. Relaties met Griekse en Latijnse poëzie; Nachleben"), and "Studies over afzonderlijke gedichten".
- Hering, Wolfgang [in German] (1972). "Beobachtungen zu Catull c. 68, 41–160". Acta Classica Universitatis Scientiarum Debreceniensis (in German). 8: 31–61.
  Reviews scholarship on Catullus 68 during the period 1959–1972.
- Loomis, Julia W. (1972). "Bibliography". Studies in Catullan Verse: An Analysis of Word Types and Patterns in the Polymetra. Mnemosyne, Supplements. Vol. 24. Lugdunum Batavorum: E. J. Brill. pp. 153–160. doi:10.1163/9789004327337_013. ISBN 90-04-03429-3.
  A monograph about Catullan metrics with a "particularly rich bibliographic documentation".
- Bardon, Henricus [in German], ed. (1973). Catulli Veronensis Carmina (in Latin) (2nd ed.). Stutgardia: B. G. Teubner. ISBN 3-519-01133-6.
  In this edition of Catullus, each poem is accompanied with bibliographic notes; general bibliographic references are listed in a Conspectus librorum (pp. XXVII–XXXII).
- Luck, Georg (1973). "Probleme der römischen Liebeselegie in der neueren Forschung". In Temporini, Hildegard (ed.). Von den Anfängen Roms bis zum Ausgang der Republik: Sprache und Literatur (1. Jahrhundert v. Chr.). Aufstieg und Niedergang der römischen Welt (in German). Vol. I.3. Berlin: De Gruyter. pp. 361–368. doi:10.1515/9783110836424-010. ISBN 3-11-004251-7.
  Reviews previous decade of scholarship on Roman love elegy, with sections on Catullus, Tibullus, Propertius, and Ovid.
- Quinn, Kenneth (1973). "Trends in Catullan Criticism". In Temporini, Hildegard (ed.). Von den Anfängen Roms bis zum Ausgang der Republik: Sprache und Literatur (1. Jahrhundert v. Chr.). Aufstieg und Niedergang der römischen Welt. Vol. I.3. Berlin: De Gruyter. pp. 369–389. doi:10.1515/9783110836424-011. ISBN 3-11-004251-7.
  Divided into five sections: "Text", "Translations", "Interpretations", "The Lesbia Poems", and "The Collection". Mostly concentrated to scholarship from the 1950s and later, but with a discussion on historical perspective.
- Granarolo, Jean (1973–1974). "Catulle 1948–1973 (codicologie, éditions; environnement, biographie; genèse et spécificité du Liber)". Lustrum (in French). 17: 27–70, 217–218. Archived (PDF) from the original on 19 December 2022.
  Includes 165 numbered entries within six sections: "1. Manuscrits et histoire du texte", "2. Éditions, traductions, commentaires", "3. Cadre historique et littéraire", "4. Repères biographiques et chronologiques", "5. Constitution et disposition du Liber", and "6. Problèmes d'unité psychologique, éthique, idéologique, sentimentale"; an author index is at the end of the volume. Provides summaries and commentary.
- Heine, Rolf [in German] (1975). "Einführung". In Heine, Rolf (ed.). Catull. Wege der Forschung (in German). Vol. 308. Darmstadt: Wissenschaftliche Buchgesellschaft. pp. 1–15. ISBN 3-534-05297-8.
  Introduction to a collection of papers 1912–1973; review of how "unity" throughout Catullus's oeuvre became a concern of 20th century Catullan criticism, and how psychological, aesthetic, and chronological issues have been incorporated into this scholarship.
- Stoessl, Franz [in German] (1977). "Verzeichnis der abgekürzt zitierten Literatur". C. Valerius Catullus: Mensch, Leben, Dichtung. Beiträge zur klassischen Philologie (in German). Vol. 85. Meisenheim-am-Glan: Anton Hain. pp. 262–264. ISBN 3-445-01479-5.
  A contemporary book review noted it has a "perfectly up to date bibliography". Covers up through 1975.
- Harrauer, Hermann [in German] (1979). A Bibliography to Catullus. Bibliography to the Augustan Poetry. Vol. III. Hildesheim: Gerstenberg. ISBN 3-8067-0787-1.
  An unannotated bibliography including more than 2,900 entries dating back to 1500. Sources are listed chronologically within 17 main chapters. Entries include references to book reviews. Book contains three indices: passages, topics, and modern authors. Coverage mostly goes to 1976, with occasional works published in 1977.

=== 1980s–1990s ===
- Granarolo, Jean (1982). "Bibliographie". Catulle, ce vivant. Collection d'études anciennes (in French). Paris: Les Belles Lettres. pp. 235–253. ISBN 2-251-32-843-2.

A contemporary book review noted its "very full and useful classified bibliography".

- Traina, Alfonso [in Italian] (1982). "Bibliografia". In Traina, Alfosno; Mandruzzato, Enzo [in Italian] (eds.). Catullo: I canti. I classici della BUR (in Italian). Milano: Rizzoli. pp. 45–54. ISBN 88-17-12398-6.
  Includes reviews of various editions, commentaries, and general studies of Catullus.
- Holoka, James P. (1985). Gaius Valerius Catullus: A Systematic Bibliography. Garland Reference Library of the Humanities. Vol. 513. New York: Garland. ISBN 0-8240-8897-2.
  Covers the period 1878–1981, with occasional items published in 1982 and 1983. Includes 3,111 items within nine chapters. Most entries are unannotated; some have very short descriptions. Includes an author index. Books often include table of contents as well as citations to book reviews. It also makes ample use of cross-referencing.
- Granarolo, Jean (1986–1987). "Catulle 1960–1985". Lustrum (in French). 28–29: 65–106. Archived (PDF) from the original on 19 December 2022.
  Compiles sources related to poetic aspects: influences on Catullus, structures, use of language and style, and metrics.
- Ferguson, John (1988). Catullus. Greece and Rome, New Surveys in the Classics. Vol. 20. Oxford: Clarendon. doi:10.1017/S0533245100021799.
  Each chapter of this survey summarizes the main scholarship on Catullus; the book also has a bibliography. Book has includes sources up through c. 1985. Sections include: "Text", "Life of Catullus", "Did Catullus edit his own book?", "Literary Inheritance", "Catullus and his Weltanschauung", "The Lesbia Poems", "The Polymetrics", "The Elegiac Poems", "Translations", and "Influence".
- Fedeli, Paolo (1990). "Bibliografia". Introduzione a Catullo. Gli Scrittori (in Italian). Vol. 20. Bari: Laterza. pp. 137–168. ISBN 88-420-3680-3.
  Contemporary book reviews said its bibliography was "detailed and useful" as well as "highly up-to-date and well-articulated". The final chapter, "Il dibattito critico" (pp. 125–136), summarizes research on Catullus in France and Italy occurring from the 1940s to 1980s.
- Granarolo, Jean (1990). "Introduction à Catulle, Poésies. Présentation de l'œuvre et des problèmes qu'elle soulève (1er partie)". Vita Latina (in French). 119: 2–14. doi:10.3406/vita.1990.1613.
  ——— (1990). "Introduction à Catulle, Poésies. Présentation de l'œuvre et des problèmes qu'elle soulève (2e partie)". Vita Latina (in French). 120: 2–12. doi:10.3406/vita.1990.1625.
  Provides a bibliographic, historical overview of Catullan studies. Focuses on various scholarly questions from the mid-20th century, including the transmission of the text, the overall structure of the collection, and psychological and spiritual aspects.
- Thomson, D. F. S., ed. (1998) [1997]. Catullus. Phoenix. Supplementary. Vol. 34 (Repr. with corr., 1st ed.). Toronto: University of Toronto Press. doi:10.3138/9781442672789. ISBN 0-8020-0676-0.
  A commentary on Catullus's Carmina. Bibliographic information appear throughout the book: an overview of editions and commentaries, a "Bibliography" (subdivided into "General" and "On the History of the Text"), a list of sources of emendations, and a bibliography for each poem. The sources for each poem go up through approximately 1993; the bibliographies for each poem are limited to sources specifically devoted to that poem versus sources which discuss individual poems in larger contexts.
- Martindale, Charles (1999). "Foreword to the 1999 Edition". The Catullan Revolution. By Quinn, Kenneth (2nd ed.). London: Bristol Classical Press. pp. vii–xxxv. ISBN 1-85399-600-9.
  Reviews some focuses of 20th century Catullan scholarship: "Historical Context", "Callimacheanism", "Obscenity", "Sexuality and Gender". Bibliography only includes works written in English.

=== 2000s–2010s ===
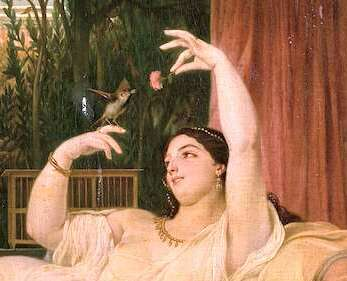
Juan J. Valverde Abril's bibliography focuses on Lesbia, depicted here as the puella in Catullus 2, and her likely real-world correspondent, Clodia.

- Scarsi, Mariangela (2000). "Rassegna catulliana (1985–1999)". Bollettino di Studi Latini (in Italian). 30 (1): 143–203.
  Summarizes sources, grouped into eight thematic sections: "1. Biografia e produzione poetica", "2. I carmina docta", "3. Polimetri ed epigrammi", "4. Linguistica e filologia", "5. Antropologia e folklore", "6. Il tema religioso", "7. L'ambiente della cultura cisalpina", and "8. Fortleben". Mostly, but not exclusively, focused on material written in Italian.
- Syndikus, Hans Peter [in German] (2001). "Bibliographischer Nachtrag 2001". Catull. Eine Interpretation (in German). Vol. 3 (2nd, Sd.-Ausg. ed.). Darmstadt: Wissenschaftliche Buchgesellschaft. pp. 153–179. ISBN 3-534-15069-4.
  The 2001 edition includes a "copious and valuable bibliographic update". Covers scholarship up through 2000. Includes summaries.
- Gaisser, Julia Haig (2007). "Introduction: Themes in Catullan Criticism (c. 1950–2000)". In Gaisser, Julia Haig (ed.). Catullus. Oxford Readings in Classical Studies. Oxford: Oxford University Press. pp. 1–24. ISBN 978-0-19-928035-3.
  Introduction to a collection of 28 papers on Catullus. Describes how obscenity, structure, the Neoteric movement, and allusion became a focus of Catulluan research during the 1980s and how Catullan scholars in the 1990s questioned and argued against many of the axioms of New Criticism.
- Valverde Abril, Juan J. (2009). "Bibliografia Clodiana (I): Nota bibliográfica sobre la figura de Clodia-Lesbia". Florentia Iliberritana (in Spanish). 20: 309–343.
  ——— (2010). "Bibliografia Clodiana (II): Creación artística y literaria en torno a la figura de Clodia-Lesbia". Florentia Iliberritana (in Spanish). 21: 445–464.
  Thematically arranged bibliography on Clodia/Lesbia. The first part includes sources focused on Clodia/Lesbia in antiquity, including in Catullus's poetry; the second part is about the lasting influence of Clodia/Lesbia in literature.
- Skinner, Marilyn B. (2015). "A Review of Scholarship on Catullus 1985–2015". Lustrum. 57: 91–360. doi:10.13109/lutr.2015.57.1.91. ISBN 978-3-525-80230-4.
  Provides commentary on sources, which are sorted into different thematic sections: "I. Bibliographies, Editions, Textual Criticism and Exegesis, and Commentaries", "II. General Studies", "III. Arrangement of the Corpus", and "IV. Critical Interpretations", themselves divided into further subcategories. Studies on individual poems are "not exhaustive and selected to show trends in opinions on key issues since the mid-1990s."
- Gibertini, Simone (2015). "Per una bibliografia critica del Codex Traguriensis (Paris, B. N. F., Lat. 7989)". Paideia (in Italian). 70: 393–452. doi:10.1400/236554.
  ——— (2017). "Giunte alla bibliografia critica del manoscritto Paris, B. N. F., Latin 7989: 1816–1954". Paideia (in Italian). 72: 725–739. doi:10.1400/254571.
  ——— (2018). "Integrazioni alla bibliografia critica del Codex Traguriensis (Paris, B. N. F., Latin 7989): 1961–1999". Paideia (in Italian). 73 (1): 81–92. doi:10.1400/257071.
  Bibliography (1664–2014) of the Codex Traguriensis, a manuscript with the Cena Trimalchionis and poetry by Tibullus, Propertius, Catullus, and Claudian. Addenda include additional works and indices of names, subjects, places, and manuscripts.

== Online ==
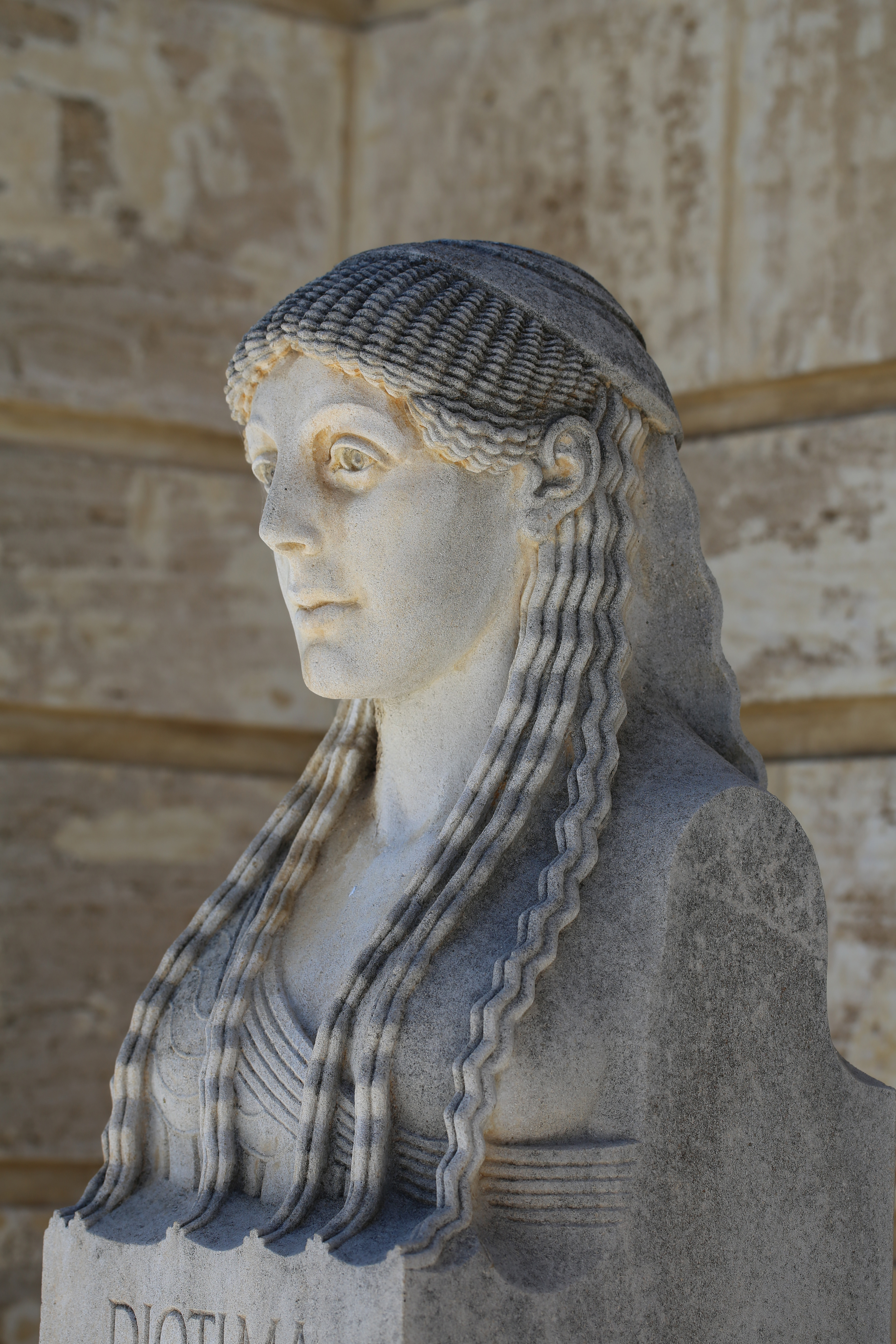
The online resource Diotíma is named after Diotima of Mantinea.

- Cuypers, Martine (2012). "Catullus". A Hellenistic Bibliography.
  Primarily about the influence of Hellenistic poetry on Catullus, but works on related topics are also included.
- Holzberg, Niklas [in German] (2014). "Catull". Das griechische und römische Epigramm: Eine Bibliographie (.doc) (in German). München: Bibliographien zur antiken Literatur. pp. 108–197. Archived from the original on 21 November 2022.
  Has an alphabetical listing, followed by systematic groupings by reference types, research topics, and poems covered.
- Kiss, Dániel (2017). "Bibliography". Catullus Online: An Online Repertory of Conjectures on Catullus. Archived from the original on 26 November 2022.
  Sources for Kiss's critical apparatus, which aims to compile every conjecture on Catullus since 1472. The bibliography contains 932 entries as of November 2019.
- Wikipedia contributors (2018). "Talk:Catullus/References". Wikipedia.
  Created as part of the defunct WikiProject for Catullus. Categorized by poem; incomplete coverage.
- Konstan, David; Skinner, Marilyn B. (2019). Catullus. Oxford Bibliographies: Classics. Oxford University Press. doi:10.1093/obo/9780195389661-0010.
  Includes a few, key publications for each of various subfields. An earlier version of this bibliography, edited only by Konstan, was made into an eBook.
- Witzke, Serena S., ed. (2019). "Bibliographies: Catullus". Diotíma. 3.0. Women's Classical Caucus. Archived from the original on 27 October 2022.
  Sources relevant to scholarship on views of women, gender, and sexuality in classical antiquity. Sorted alphabetically by author.

== Works cited ==
- Albrecht, Michael von (2012). "Catull". Geschichte der römischen Literatur: Von Andronicus bis Boethius und ihr Fortwirken (in German). Vol. 1 (3rd ed.). Berlin: De Gruyter. pp. 284–305. doi:10.1515/9783110266740.43. ISBN 978-3-11-026525-5.
- [APh] (2019). "Catullus (C. Valerius)". L'Année philologique (in French, Italian, English, Spanish, and German). 90 (1): 159–168. ISBN 978-2-503-59197-1.
- Arkins, Brian (1982). "Bibliography". Sexuality in Catullus. Altertumswissenschaftliche Texte und Studien. Vol. 8. Hildesheim: George Olms. pp. 215–260. ISBN 3-487-07277-7.
- Biondi, Giuseppe Gilberto (1998). "Catullo". In Lana, Italo; Maltese, Enrico V. (eds.). Dall'ellenismo all'età di Traiano. Storia della civiltà letteraria greca e latina (in Italian). Vol. 2. Torino: UTET. pp. 461–484. ISBN 88-02-05293-X.
- Bloch, Hugo; Todtmann, Solms, eds. (1898). "Verzeichnis der in den Bänden 1–87 enthaltenen Referate". General-Register zur ersten bis dritten Folge (Jahrgang I–XXIII = Band 1–87). Jahresbericht über die Fortschritte der classischen Altertumswissenschaft (in German). Leipzig: O. R. Reisland. pp. 689–699.
- Boucher, Jean-Paul (1984). "Catulle: Carmina (1–116)". Bibliographie sélective pour les Agrégations des Lettres et de Grammaire. L'Information littéraire (in French). 36 (4): 178–179.
- Brannan, Patrick T. (1972). "Approaches to Catullus, edited by Kenneth Quinn". Book Reviews. Classical Folia. 26: 323–328.
- Chronopoulos, Stylianos; Maier, Felix K.; Novokhatko, Anna, eds. (2020). Digitale Altertumswissenschaften: Thesen und Debatten zu Methoden und Anwendungen. Digital Classics Books (in German and English). Vol. 4. Heidelberg: Propylaeum. doi:10.11588/propylaeum.563. ISBN 978-3-947450-92-3.
- Dee, James H. (1980). "A Survey of Recent Bibliographies of Classical Literature". The Classical World. 73 (5): 275–290. doi:10.2307/4349197. JSTOR 4349197.
- Donlan, Walter (1978). "Introduction". The Classical World Bibliography of Roman Drama and Poetry and Ancient Fiction. Garland Reference Library of the Humanities. Vol. 97. New York: Garland. pp. vii–xvii. ISBN 0-8240-9876-5.
- Eisenhut, Werner, ed. (2000). "Literaturhinweise". Catull: Gedichte: Lateinisch–deutsch (in German) (11th ed.). München: Artemis & Winkler. pp. 244–250. doi:10.1515/9783110357240.244. ISBN 3-7608-1515-4.
- Fantoli, Mirella (1962). "Filologia classical". Schedario. Idea (in Italian). 18 (2): 143–144. ISSN 0019-1280.
- Fedeli, Paolo (1994). "Bibliografia". Introduzione a Catullo (in Italian) (2nd ed.). Bari: Laterza. pp. 137–168. ISBN 88-420-3680-3.
- Fo, Alessandro, ed. (2018). "Riferimenti bibliografici: Avvertenza". Gaio Valerio Catullo: Le poesie (in Italian). Torino: Giulio Einaudi. pp. 1225–1229. ISBN 978-88-06-22359-5.
- Frank, Tenney (1928). "Notes on Catullus". Catullus and Horace: Two Poets in Their Environment. New York: Henry Holt. pp. 279–284. hdl:2027/mdp.39015005284651.
- Gaisser, Julia Haig (2007). "Introduction: Themes in Catullan Criticism (c. 1950–2000)". In Gaisser, Julia Haig (ed.). Catullus. Oxford Readings in Classical Studies. Oxford: Oxford University Press. pp. 1–24. ISBN 978-0-19-928035-3.
- [Gärtner, Hans; Weißenberger, Michael], eds. (2009). "Register der Bände 1–50". Lustrum (in German). 51: 331–343. ISBN 978-3-525-80205-2.
- Glücklich, Hans-Joachim (2006). "Literatur". Catulls Gedichte im Unterricht (in German) (3rd ed.). Göttingen: Vandenhoeck & Ruprecht. pp. 104–109. ISBN 978-3-525-25659-6.
- Granarolo, Jean (1956). "Où en sont nos connaissances sur Catulle?". L'Information littéraire (in French). 8 (2): 56–65.
- Granarolo, Jean (1964). "Catulle: Poésies". Bibliographie sommaire pour les Agrégations de Lettres et de Grammaire. L'Information littéraire (in French). 16 (4): 178.
- Granarolo, Jean (1971). "Catulle: Poésies". Bibliographie sommaire pour les Agrégations de Lettres et de Grammaire. L'Information littéraire (in French). 23 (4): 187–188.
- Granarolo, Jean (1976). "Catulle". Bibliographie sommaire pour les Agrégations de Lettres et de Grammaire. L'Information littéraire (in French). 28 (4): 189–190.
- Granarolo, Jean (1982). "Bibliographie". Catulle, ce vivant. Collection d'études anciennes (in French). Paris: Les Belles Lettres. pp. 235–253. ISBN 2-251-32-843-2.
- Harrauer, Hermann (1979). A Bibliography to Catullus. Bibliography to the Augustan Poetry. Vol. III. Hildesheim: Gerstenberg. ISBN 3-8067-0787-1.
- Holoka, James P. (1985). Gaius Valerius Catullus: A Systematic Bibliography. Garland Reference Library of the Humanities. Vol. 513. New York: Garland. ISBN 0-8240-8897-2.
- Holzberg, Niklas, ed. (2009). "Literaturhinweise". C. Valerius Catullus: Carmina: Gedichte: Lateinisch–deutsch (in German). Düsseldorf: Artemis & Winkler. pp. 272–278. ISBN 978-3-538-03508-9.
- Jenkins, Fred W. (2006). Classical Studies: A Guide to the Reference Literature. Reference Sources in the Humanities (2nd ed.). Westport, CT: Libraries Unlimited. ISBN 1-59158-119-2.
- Konstan, David (2010). Catullus: Oxford Bibliographies Online Research Guide. Oxford University Press. ISBN 978-0-19-980498-6.
- Konstan, David; Skinner, Marilyn B. (2019). Catullus. Oxford Bibliographies: Classics. Oxford University Press. doi:10.1093/obo/9780195389661-0010.
- [Körte, Alfred], ed. (1914). "Verzeichnis der in den Bänden 88–163 (Jahrg. 1896 bis 1913) erschienenen Berichte". Jahresbericht über die Fortschritte der klassischen Altertumswissenschaft (in German). 166: 119–128.
- Kroymann, J. (1989) [1968]. "Bibliographie zu Catull für die Jahre 1929–1967". In Kroll, Wilhelm (ed.). C. Valerius Catullus (in German) (7th ed.). Stuttgart: B. G. Teubner. pp. 301–318. doi:10.1515/9783110951851.301. ISBN 3-519-24001-7.
- Lambrino, Scarlat (1951). "Catullus". Bibliographie de l'antiquité classique: 1896–1914 (in French). Vol. 1. Paris: Les Belles Lettres. pp. 111–114.
- Leon, Harry J. (1960). "A Quarter Century of Catullan Scholarship (1934–1959)". The Classical World. 53 (4): 104–113. doi:10.2307/4344282. JSTOR 4344282.
- Marouzeau, J. (1927). "Catullus". Dix années de bibliographie classique: Bibliographie critique et analytique de l'antiquité gréco-latine pour la période 1914–1924 (in French). Vol. 1. Paris: Les Belles Lettres. pp. 72–75.
- McKay, Alexander G. (1974). "Index of CW Surveys of Scholarship". The Classical World. 67 (4): 221–224. JSTOR 4348005.
- [Münscher, Karl], ed. (1924). "Verzeichnis der in den Jahrgängen 1908–1924 (Band 138–202) enthaltenen Berichte". Jahresbericht über die Fortschritte der klassischen Altertumswissenschaft (in German). 201: 205–212. hdl:2027/osu.32435027186865.
- Nat, P. G. van der (1963). "Catullus (I)". Lampadion (in Dutch). 4 (1): 18–24.
- Quinn, Kenneth (1959). "Preface". The Catullan Revolution. Melbourne University Press. pp. [vii]–[viii].
- Quinn, Kenneth (1972). "Introduction". In Quinn, Kenneth (ed.). Approaches to Catullus. Views and Controversies About Classical Antiquity. Cambridge: Heffer. pp. ix–xii. ISBN 0-85270-063-6.
- Quinn, Kenneth (1973). "Note on Books". Catullus: An Interpretation. New York: Barnes & Noble. pp. x–xi. ISBN 0-06-495757-8.
- Ramous, Mario (2009). "Guida bibliografica". In Ramous, Mario (ed.). Gaio Valerio Catullo: Le poesie. I grandi libri (in Italian) (15th ed.). Milano: Garzanti. pp. xxxix–lvii. ISBN 978-88-11-36114-5.
- Rose, H. J. (1936). "Lucretius and the New Poets". A Handbook of Latin Literature: From the Earliest Times to the Death of St. Augustine. London: Methuen. pp. 120–155.
- [Ruijgh, C. J.; Nat, P. G. van der; Janssen, L. F.], eds. (1962). "De Romeinse elegie (I)". Lampadion (in Dutch). 2 (4): 58–64.
- Ruiz Sánchez, Marcos (1996). "Prolegómenos". Confectum carmine: En torno a la poesía de Catulo (in Spanish). Vol. I. Murcia: Universidad de Murcia. pp. 17–43. ISBN 84-7684-764-5.
- Schmale, Michaela (2004). "Das c. 64 in der Forschung". Bilderreigen und Erzähllabyrinth: Catulls Carmen 64 (in German). München: K. G. Saur. pp. 17–43. doi:10.1515/9783110940374.17. ISBN 3-598-77824-4.
- Skinner, Marilyn B. (2015). "A Review of Scholarship on Catullus 1985–2015". Lustrum. 57: 91–360. doi:10.13109/lutr.2015.57.1.91. ISBN 978-3-525-80230-4.
- Small, Stuart G. P. (1983). "List of Works Cited". Catullus: A Reader's Guide to the Poems. Lanham, MD: University Press of America. pp. 182–195. ISBN 0-8191-2905-4.
- Smolenaars, J. J. L. (1971). "Catullus (II)". Lampas (in Dutch). 4 (1): 126–130. Archived from the original on 5 December 2022.
- [Thierfelder, Andreas], ed. (1944–1955). "Übersicht der jeweils letzten Berichte über die einzelnen Gebiete". Jahresbericht über die Fortschritte der klassischen Altertumswissenschaft (in German). 285: [iii]–[iv].
- Thomson, D. F. S. (1971). "Recent Scholarship on Catullus (1960–69)". The Classical World. 65 (4): 116–126. JSTOR 4347610.
- Traina, Alfonso (2001). "Bibliografia". In Traina, Alfonso; Mandruzzato, Enzo (eds.). Catullo: I canti (in Italian) (15th ed.). Milano: Biblioteca Universale Rizzoli. pp. 45–54. ISBN 88-17-123-98-6.
- Troike, Rudolph C., ed. (1990). "Romance: Italic: Latin". Bibliography of Bibliographies of the Languages of the World. Volume 1: General and Indo-European languages of Europe. Library and Information Sources in Linguistics. Vol. 19. Amsterdam: John Benjamins. pp. 147–152. doi:10.1075/lisl.19. ISBN 90-272-3743-3.
- Videau, Anne (1996). "Catulle: Poèmes". Bibliographie sélective pour les Agrégations de Lettres et de Grammaire. L'Information littéraire (in French). 48 (4): 23–25.
- Whitaker, Graham (1997a). A Bibliographical Guide to Classical Studies. Vol. 1. Hildesheim: Olms-Weidmann. ISBN 3-487-10465-2.
- Whitaker, Graham (1997b). "Catullus, Gaius Valerius". A Bibliographical Guide to Classical Studies. Vol. 2. Hildesheim: Olms-Weidmann. pp. 162–176. ISBN 3-487-10466-0.
