= International Federation of Associations of Classical Studies =

- Fédération internationale des associations d'études classiques
- Abbreviation: FIEC
- Formation: September 28, 1948; 77 years ago
- Founded at: UNESCO, Paris, France
- Headquarters: Basel, Switzerland
- Fields: Classical Studies, Antiquity
- Official language: English, French
- Secretary General: Sabine Huebner
- President: Gunhild Vidén
- Vice-President: Martha Irigoyen
- Vice-President: Jésus de la Villa
- Affiliations: International Council for Philosophy and Human Science (CIPSH/ICPSH), European Alliance for Social Sciences and Humanities (EASSH)
- Website: https://fiecnet.org

The International Federation of Associations of Classical Studies (FIEC), or Fédération internationale des associations d'études classiques (FIEC) (in French, which is its other official language) is an international association of Classical Studies associations all over the world. It encompasses national and international associations promoting the development of Classical philology, Latin, Ancient Greek, Classical archaeology, papyrology, paleography, epigraphy, numismatics, among other subjects. It was founded in Paris in 1948 at the UNESCO, where its associated journal, L'Année philologique, was also based. It currently has members in 46 countries, encompassing more than 60 national and regional associations and 14 international organizations of classical studies.

== History ==
An international network of classicists was being tentatively assembled just before the Second World War. In 1948, Juliette Ernst and Jules Marouzeau (from L'Année philologique) fond support in UNESCO, in Paris, which offered funding and logistical support from organizations such as the International Academic Union or the International Council of Philosophy and Human Sciences (ICPHS).

The founding assembly was held on 28 and 29 September 1948 at UNESCO. The first president was classical philologist Danish Carsten Høeg. Largely French at first, the FIEC became also more Anglophone from the 1980s.

Its seat is established in the city where the secretary resides. The Secretary General since 2022 is Professor Thomas Schmidt, from the University of Fribourg. The latest FIEC International Congress was held in Mexico City in 2022. The next meeting will be held in 2025 in Wrocław (Poland).

== Founding members ==
- Société d'Études Latines de Bruxelles (Belgium)
- American Philological Association (USA)
- Association Guillaume-Budé (France)
- Association pour l'encouragement des études grecques en France (France)
- Société des études latines (France)
- Société internationale de bibliographie classique (France)
- Classical Association (UK)
- The Society for the Promotion of Hellenic Studies (UK)
- The Society for the Promotion of Roman Studies (UK)
- Classical Association of Scotland (Scotland)
- Nederlands Klassiek Verbond (The Netherlands)
- Polskie Towarzystwo Filologiczne (Poland)
- Dansk Selskab for Oldtids-og Middelalderforskning (Danemark)
- Filologisk-Historiske Samfund (Danemark)
- Svenska Klassikerförbundet (Sweden)

== List of members ==
- Classical Association of South Africa (South Africa)
- Deutsche Altphilologenverband (Germany)
- Mommsen-Gesellschaft (Germany)
- Sodalitas (Austria)
- Bundesarbeitsgemeinschaft Klassischer Philologen (Austria)
- Société d'études latines de Bruxelles (Belgium)
- Sociedade Brasileira de Estudos Clássicos (Brazil)
- Parnassos Literary Society (Greece)
- Philologos (Greece)
- Scientific Society of Athens (Greece)
- Associazione Italiana di Cultura Classica (Italy)
- Centro di studi ciceroniani (Italy)
- International Plutarch Society - Sezione italiana (Italy)
- Società italiana per lo studio dell’ antichità classica (Italy)
- Schweizerische Vereinigung für Altertumswissenschaft (Switzerland)
- Groupe romand des études grecques et latines (Switzerland).
- Turkish Institute of Archaeology (Turkey)

== Additional members ==
- Association internationale d'épigraphie grecque et latine (AIEGL)
- Association internationale d'études patristiques / International Association of Patristic Studies (AIEP)
- Association internationale de papyrologues (AIP)
- Association internationale des études byzantines / International Association of Byzantine Studies (AIEB)
- Association Internationale des Etudes Néo-Latines / International Association For Neo-Latin Studies (Societas Internationalis Studiis Neolatinis Provehendis)
- Association pour l'étude de l'Antiquité tardive (APAT)
- Associazione Internazionale di Archeologia Classica (AIAC)
- Centro Internazionale per lo Studio dei Papiri Ercolanesi Marcello Gigante (CISPE)
- Comité international permanent des études mycéniennes (CIPEM)
- Fondation Hardt pour l’Étude de l’Antiquité Classique
- International Association "Geography And Historiography In Antiquity" (GAHIA)
- International Plato Society (IPS)
- Société internationale de bibliographie classique (SIBC)
- Société internationale pour l'histoire des droits de l'Antiquité (SIHDA)
- Thesaurus Linguae Latinae (TLL)

== Presidents ==
- 1948–1951: Carsten Høeg
- 1951–1954: Ronald Syme
- 1954–1959: Bernard Abraham van Groningen
- 1959–1964: Pietro Romanelli
- 1964–1969: Dag Norberg
- 1969–1974: Marcel Durry
- 1974–1979: Dionisie M. Pippidi
- 1979–1980: Wolfgang Schmid
- 1982–1984: William H. Willis
- 1984–1989: Emilio Gabba
- 1989–1994: Jean Irigoin
- 1994–1997: John Boardman
- 1997–2004: Carl Joachim Classen
- 2004–2009: Heinrich von Staden
- 2009–2014: Averil Cameron
- 2014-2019: Franco Montanari
- 2019-2022: Gunhild Vidén
- 2022-2025: Jesús de la Villa

== General secretaries ==
- 1948-1953: Charles Dugas
- 1953-1974: Juliette Ernst
- 1974-2004: François Paschoud
- 2004-2019: Paul Schubert
- 2019–2022: Sabine R. Huebner
- since 2022: Thomas Schmidt

== FIEC-Congresses ==
- 1950: Paris (France)
- 1954: Copenhagen (Denmark)
- 1959: London (Great Britain)
- 1964: Philadelphia (USA)
- 1969: Bonn (Germany)
- 1974: Madrid (Spain)
- 1979: Budapest (Hungary)
- 1984: Dublin (Ireland)
- 1989: Pisa (Italy)
- 1994: Quebec (Canada)
- 1999: Kavalla (Greece)
- 2004: Ouro Preto (Brasil)
- 2009: Berlin (Germany)
- 2014: Bordeaux (France)
- 2019: London (Great Britain)
- 2022: Mexico-City (Mexico)
- 2025: Wrocław (Poland)
