= André Plassart =

- Born: 24 August 1889; Chartres, France
- Died: 12 May 1978 (aged 88); Paris, France
- Occupations: Hellenist; Epigrapher; Archaeologist

André Plassart (24 August 1889 – 13 May 1978) was a 20th-century French hellenist, epigrapher and archaeologist.

== Selected bibliography ==
- Plassart, André (1926). "Fouilles de Thespies et de l'hiéron des muses de l'Hélicon. Inscriptions : Dédicaces de caractère religieux ou honorifique, bornes de domaines sacrés". Bulletin de correspondance hellénique (in French). 50 (50): 383–462. doi:10.3406/bch.1926.2963..
- Clement of Alexandria; Plassart, André (1942). Protreptique. Sources chrétiennes (in French). Paris: Éditions du Cerf. ISBN 2204037613..
- Plassart, André (1950). Inscriptions de Délos;Périodes de l'amphictyonie ionienne et de l'amphictyonie attico-délienne (in French). Paris: Éditions Honoré Champion. p. 43.
- Plassart, André (1958). "Inscriptions de Thespie". Bulletin de correspondance hellénique (in French). 82 (82): 107–167. doi:10.3406/bch.1958.2337..
- Plassart, André (1970). Fouilles de Delphes;Épigraphie: les inscriptions du temple du IVe – n° 276-350. École française d’Athènes (in French). Vol. III. De Boccard. ISBN 2204037613..
- Plassart, André; Constans, Léopold-Albert; Marouzeau, Jules (1934). Bibliographie des auteurs latins et grecs, programme de licence 1934-1936 (in French). Librairie Droz. p. 23..

== Studies on Plassart ==
- Recueil Plassart;Études sur l'antiquité grecque offertes à André Plassart par ses collègues de la Sorbonne (in French). Paris: Les Belles Lettres. 1976. p. 234..
- Irigoin, Jean (1978). "Allocution". Revue des études grecques (in French). 91 (91–2): XXVIII–XXX..
