= Reading list =

Reading list may refer to:

- Reading list, a list of publications to be read (completely or partially), e.g., as part of the syllabus of an academic course
- Reading List, a Safari (web browser) bookmarking feature for saving links to webpages, with simple metadata for later reading, synchronized across devices
