= Citation dynamics =

Number of references received by a scientific work over time

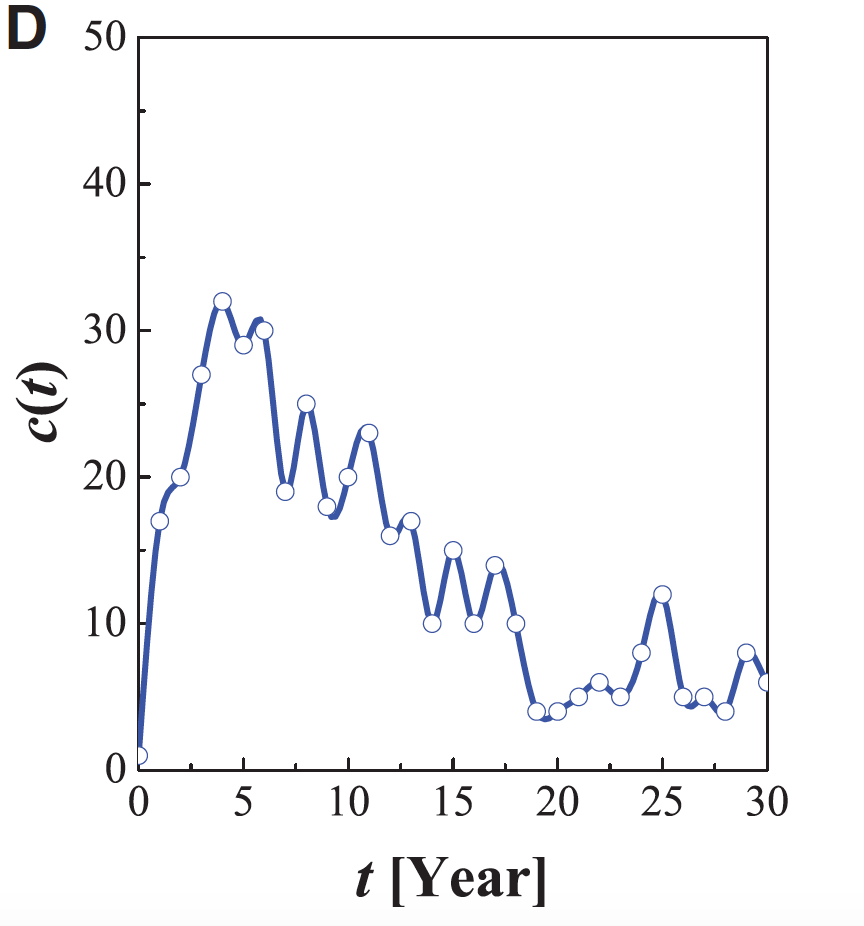
Yearly citation c(t) for a research paper from the e Physical Review corpus.

Citation dynamics describes the number of references received by the article or other scientific work over time. The citation dynamics is usually described by the bang, that take place two–three years after the work has been published, and the burst size spans several orders of magnitude. The presence of bursts is not consistent with other models based on preferential attachment. Those models are able to account for the skewed citation distribution but their reference accumulation is gradual.

The dynamics of scientific production has changed significantly over the past years. Due to technological progress, the number of published papers has been increasing exponentially until now. This, along with a much shorter time needed for the article to be published, has affected the citation dynamics of the modern papers. Furthermore, if the reference list of the study includes papers published in different years, older papers tend to have more citations. This may not necessarily because they are better but just because they had more time to accumulate those references.

== Model ==
It has been found that citation distributions are best described by a shifted power-law. The probability that paper $i$ is cited at time $t$ after publication as:

$$\Pi_{i}(t) = \eta_{i}c_i^tP_{i}(t)$$

where $\Pi_{i}(t)$ serves as the outcome variable for each particular paper $i$ at time $t$. Fitness, $\eta_i$, captures the inherent differences between papers, accounting for the perceived novelty and importance of a discovery. $c_i^t$ represents the cumulative number of citations acquired by a paper $i$ at time $t$ and $P_{i}(t)$ is a log-normal survival probability. The probability is equal

$$P_{i}(t) = \frac{1}{\sqrt{2\pi}\sigma_it} exp \left \lbrack -\frac{(ln t - \mu_i)^2}{2\sigma_i^2} \right \rbrack$$

where $t$ is time; $\sigma$ is longevity, capturing the decay rate; and $m$ indicates immediacy, governing the time for a paper to reach its citation peak. The ultimate impact $c_i^{\infty}$ represents the total number or citations that the paper receives during its lifetime.

$$c_i^{\infty} = m(e^{\lambda_i} - 1)$$

Where $m$ is a global parameter that has the same value for all publications. $\lambda_i$ represents the relative fitness of the paper. From the above formula, we can see that the total number of references that the paper can receive during its lifetime depends only on its relative fitness which is very hard to quantify.

== See also ==
- Citation index
