= Bibliographic Index =

- Discipline: Bibliography
- Language: English

Publication details
- History: 1937–2011
- Publisher: H. W. Wilson (United States)
- Frequency: Quarterly

Standard abbreviations
- ISO 4: Bibliogr. Index

Indexing
- ISSN: 0006-1255

The Bibliographic Index: A Cumulative Bibliography of Bibliographies was a metabibliography and bibliographic database published by the H. W. Wilson Company. It contained in-depth indexing of more than 530,000 bibliographies published in English, German, Dutch, and the Scandinavian, Slavic, and Romance languages, including over 185,000 full-text bibliographies.

In 2004, Bibliographic Index became Bibliographic Index Plus. After EBSCO acquired the H. W. Wilson Company in 2011, the database was discontinued.
