= Lustrum (disambiguation) =

Lustrum (plural lustra) was a term for a sacrificial purification ritual every five-years in Ancient Rome.

Lustrum may also refer to:

- Lustrum (novel), a novel by Robert Harris in his trilogy about Cicero
- Lustrum (journal), a review journal for classical studies
- Lustrum Press, founded by photographer Ralph Gibson in 1970.
