= Membership of the Royal Colleges of Surgeons =

Postgraduate diploma for surgeons in the UK and Ireland

Membership of the Royal Colleges of Surgeons (MRCS) is a postgraduate diploma for surgeons in the UK and Ireland. Obtaining this qualification allows a doctor to become a member of one of the four surgical colleges in the UK and Ireland, namely the Royal College of Surgeons of Edinburgh, the Royal College of Surgeons of England, the Royal College of Physicians and Surgeons of Glasgow and the Royal College of Surgeons in Ireland. The examination, currently organised on an intercollegiate basis, is required to enter higher surgical training (ST 3+) in one of the Royal colleges. Thus today's MRCS has replaced the former MRCS (Eng), MRCS (Ed), MRCS (Glas), and MRCS (I). (Similarly, the MRCP is also intercollegiate now.)

== History ==
Each college used to hold examinations independently, which is what the post-nominal MRCS used to indicate, for example, MRCS (London) specifically. After decades of discussion of possible intercollegiate MRCS and FRCS, they were implemented in the 21st century, at first by unifying the syllabus of the separate qualifications of MRCS(Eng), MRCS(Glas), MRCS(Ed), and MRCS(I). In January 2004, the four colleges switched over to a common examination, known as the Intercollegiate MRCS.

== Examination ==
The MRCS qualification consists of a multi-part examination including both theory and practical assessments. Part A is a 5-hour examination which assesses the applied basic sciences (a 3-hour paper in the morning) and principles of surgery in general (a 2-hour paper in the afternoon) using multiple-choice Single Best Answer only. It has a passing mark around 71% and pass rate of around 30 per cent. Maximum number of attempts for Part A is 6 and there are usually 3 sittings per year in January, April and September. Part B is a 4-hour practical examination which assesses elements of day-to-day surgical practice through 17 stations of 9 minutes each (with additional resting and preparation stations) on anatomy, pathology, critical care, clinical procedures and patient evaluation (history taking, clinical examination and communication skills). Each station carries a maximum of 20 marks and an additional global rating by the examiner. It has a pass rate of around 50 per cent. Maximum number of attempts for Part B is 4 and there are usually 3 sittings per year in February, May and October. Current curricula have changed to introduce the completion of both exams as a mandatory requirement to complete core surgical training prior to application to higher surgical training (ST3) in the UK. Trainees often require multiple attempts at the examination in order to pass.

== Examination preparation ==
A large and varied collection of commercial revision resources are available which can improve a candidate's chances of success. These resources include courses, books, online question banks and mobile applications.

== See also ==
- Fellowship of the Royal Colleges of Surgeons
