= Pathfinder (library science) =

Bibliographic guide to info sources

A pathfinder is a bibliography created to help begin research in a particular topic or subject area. Pathfinders are also called subject guides, topic guides, research guides, libguides, information portals, resource lists or study guides. Pathfinders produced by the Library of Congress are known as "tracer bullets". What is special about a pathfinder is that it only refers to the information in a specific location, i.e. the shelves of a local library.

According to the Online Dictionary for Library and Information Science, a pathfinder is "designed to lead the user through the process of researching a specific topic, or any topic in a given field or discipline, usually in a systematic, step-by-step way, making use of the best finding tools the library has to offer. Pathfinders may be printed or available online."

The goal of a pathfinder is to gather the most useful, relevant, reliable and authoritative resources on a variety of academic, work-related or general-interest topics. Originally provided in print format in the 20th century in large academic libraries, pathfinders have evolved with the emergence of the World Wide Web and may now act as portals to information about resources in a variety of formats, including books, encyclopedias, bibliographic databases, almanacs, documentaries, websites, search engines and journals.

Often used as curriculum tools for bibliographic instruction, the guides help library users find materials or help those unfamiliar with a discipline understand the key sources."

== Purpose ==
Pathfinders are intended to be a launch point for research on a particular topic, via the collection of select materials available in a particular institution on that topic. However they are not generally an exhaustive collection of all of the materials on a given topic- they are designed for beginners in research to find the fundamental information they need to get started. In addition to this basic concept, many research guides include other complex goals, such as "teaching how to complete a given task, providing access to tools for actually doing it, promoting collections and services, educating users about the research process, and providing disciplinary context for in-depth research needs". Pathfinders also help to teach essential information and technology skills, and promote books and reading. They are broader in scope than subject headings, and have been chosen from university course descriptions, thesis titles, and from term paper titles. Breaking down the topic the pathfinder is about is recommended to reduce the cognitive load for users. For public libraries, it has been suggested to use surveys, past experience and hot topics from local media to find topics for pathfinders. It has been argued to expand the purpose of a research guide from being a list of resources to also incorporating instruction on information literacy, both in 1984 and 2014.

== Format ==
MIT pathfinders in the 1970s had the following format:

- Scope - a definition of the subject covered by the pathfinder.
- An introduction to this is in... - typically an encyclopedia or specialised dictionary.
- Books - alerting readers to relevant subject terms.
- Reference Works - citations for specific books.
- Bibliographies - lists of sources which are too long to include in the pathfinder.
- Journal Articles - referring readers to indexes.
- Journals - referring readers to journals and magazines to browse that might have some information.
- Reviews, government sources, etc. - other sources as appropriate.

Although the format varied, it emphasised subjects that were broad in scope and providing many different types of sources to the reader. In contrast, some academic libraries created specific pathfinders that functioned as a partial bibliography. Jackson rejected the bibliographic format in 1984, arguing that search strategies should be taught in a pathfinder. In 2012, a study on mental models of research guides showed that students preferred guides which were format-agnostic rather than grouped by format type. In 1995, Jim Kapoun argued that key features of good pathfinders were "compactness and basic informational resources". Browser extensions like alternative search plugins have been added to subject guides.

== History ==
Booklists have been produced by libraries since at least the 1950s. Patricia Knapp, in the 1960s, integrated librarianship with academic instruction, but the term pathfinder was coined in 1972 by Marie Canfield. From approximately 1973-1975, the Model Library Program sold pathfinders among libraries, but there was not enough interest to continue selling pathfinders, as most libraries preferred to create their own. However, this was an expensive proposition, as collection-tailored pathfinders took about 8 - 20 hours of librarians' time as of the 1980s.

From the mid-1990s, as the Internet became more popular, libraries began including web resources in their pathfinders and putting the pathfinders on their websites. This was not true for hospital libraries, as the technical complexity of the web and centralised control of hospital websites made it difficult for librarians to make web-based pathfinders. Webliographies became popular, lists of web links that were curated by librarians on a topic. These differed from pathfinders because they did not focus on the library's collection. As library services became increasingly accessible online, options for creating online pathfinders expanded, including webpages, LibGuides, and open-source content management systems. LibGuides was "ubiqutious" as of 2019, thought to be due to its ease of use.

== Usage ==
Library clients can use pathfinders at their own pace, and may find them "more approachable" than a reference desk. Electronic pathfinders on a library website can be used 24 hours a day. In higher education, embedding library subject guides into a learning management system has been shown to increase use of library resources among students. Pathfinders are often introduced to students as part of a one-shot library orientation session. A 2011 study found that students often do not use library guides simply by not knowing they exist, or preferring to use a search engine or a trusted bibliographic database instead. This study found that students would use the subject guides if they didn't know where to begin, or if they were navigating a new discipline or if their lecturer told them to. While the stated audience for pathfinders are library clients, Jackson and Pellack reported that reference librarians regarded them as a useful tool for training and for librarians at the front desk. It has been proposed that creating and maintaining library guides may be considered a professional development activity for librarians, and their creation has been used as an assessment in library studies education programs.

== Critique ==
It has been argued that pathfinders do not take a user-centred approach. Inconsistent formatting and overly-complex language have also been pointed to as being key points to watch out for. Some students become frustrated with dead links on subject guides, or the omission of resources that they consider essential. Maintaining and updating pathfinders is considered problematic. The use of Web 2.0 tools such as wikis and blogs are considered to be helpful in enabling smaller libraries to quickly update their pathfinders. Additionally, automatically checking web links to see if they are still working may be useful. Individual librarians may consider themselves to "own" particular subject guides, rather than seeing a subject guide as one part of the institution's suite of subject guides. It has also been said that librarians take a compilatory rather than a research attitude to creating a pathfinder. Little study has been done on how well a pathfinder covers its subject matter. A study found that pathfinders did not show the multi-disciplinary nature of literary studies well. Jackson and Pellack examined similar subject guides at different institutions to find out about duplication of effort in pathfinders. They found that there was little overlap between subject guides at different institutions, and that some websites used were of questionable quality. Furthermore, they found that libraries did not typically delete outdated pathfinders, because "something was better than nothing". When academic libraries' subject guides are reviewed, they are mainly reviewed by the original authors. When pathfinders at the course level are created, it may cause confusion to the students if the teacher also creates their own resources list, or faculty may regard the librarian as overstepping their role. It has been recommended to involve faculty in the creation and promotion of library subject guides. While the literature on pathfinders regularly discusses pathfinders' potential as a pedagogical tool, often the focus of the literature is shifted to merely optimising the form of the pathfinder.

== See also ==
- Distance education
- Guide to information sources
- Library instruction
- Metabibliography
- Study guide
