= Journal of Late Antiquity =

- Discipline: Ancient history
- Language: English
- Edited by: Andrew Cain

Publication details
- History: 2008-present
- Publisher: Johns Hopkins University Press (United States)
- Frequency: Biannually

Standard abbreviations
- ISO 4: J. Late Antiq.

Indexing
- ISSN: 1939-6716 (print); 1942-1273 (web)
- OCLC no.: 226056897

Links
- Journal homepage; Online access

The Journal of Late Antiquity is an academic journal and the first international English-language journal devoted to the Late Antiquity. The journal was founded in 2008 and is published twice a year by the Johns Hopkins University Press.

The journal covers methodological, geographical, and chronological facets of Late Antiquity, from the late and post-classical world up to the Carolingian period, and including the late Roman, western European, Byzantine, Sassanid, and Islamic worlds, ca. AD 250–800. The editor in chief is Sabine R. Huebner of the University of Basel (Switzerland).

== See also ==
- Antiquity
