= Lustrum (journal) =

- Discipline: Classics
- Language: English, French, German, Italian, Latin
- Edited by: Marcus Deufert; Irmgard Männlein-Robert

Publication details
- History: 1957–present
- Publisher: Vandenhoeck & Ruprecht (Germany)
- Frequency: Annual

Standard abbreviations
- ISO 4: Lustrum

Indexing
- ISSN: 0024-7421 (print); 2197-3849 (web)
- OCLC no.: 1756285

Links
- Journal homepage; Online access at V&R eLibrary; Online access at Munich DigitiZation Center

Lustrum: Internationale Forschungsberichte aus dem Bereich des klassischen Altertums (English: "International research reports in the field of classical antiquity") is a refereed review journal in the field of classical studies. Each volume typically contains only two articles, reviewing scholarship on a particular author, genre, or other subject within a specified timeframe. Articles appear in a variety of languages, including German and English. Lustrum is published by Vandenhoeck & Ruprecht in Göttingen. The first volume of Lustrum was published in 1957 and was for the year 1956; volumes are published annually. As of 2022, its editors are Marcus Deufert and Irmgard Männlein-Robert.

== Scope and overview ==
Lustrum mostly focuses on bibliographies of ancient Greek and Roman authors and genres of literature, although other bibliographies of other topics such as archaeology, grammar, mathematics, meter, music, and paleography have occasionally been published; there have also been a couple of bibliographies concerned with the history of the field of classical studies. Typically these have lengthy bibliographies, overviewing research trends; quite often an index accompanies each article. Indices are sometimes needed because works discussed are typically not listed alphabetically; they can appear at the end of the article or the end of the entire volume. Articles can be written in German, English, French, Italian, or Latin.

In principle, these reports were supposed to come out every five years; a lustrum was a five-year period of time in Ancient Rome. For instance, Luc Brisson wrote a bibliography on Plato covering the periods 1958–1975, and then with H. Ioannidi he wrote subsequent bibliographies for the five-year periods: 1975–1980, 1980–1985, and 1985–1990. Some bibliographical articles can be quite lengthy and cover a much wider span of scholarship; an article by University of Thessaloniki professor Ioannis Touloumakos which covered scholarship on Aristotle's Politics during the period 1925–1985 is 700 pages long and took twelve years to be fully published.

Each article is typically at least a few dozen pages long. Although most volumes contain two or three articles, some volumes consist of a single book-length bibliography. Several of these volumes have been the subjects of academic book reviews.

== History ==
Lustrum was seen as the successor to Bursian's Jahresberichte. Plans to create this new journal were first made during the August 1954 meeting of the International Congress of Classical Studies. It was initially subsidized by UNESCO with support from the International Federation of Associations of Classical Studies. The first volume was edited by Hans Joachim Mette and Andreas Thierfelder. Mette and Thierfelder were friends from university, and Thierfelder had been Bursians Jahresbericht's final editor. The first volume was published in 1957 by Vandenhoeck & Ruprecht in Göttingen, Germany, and included three articles—including one by Mette on Homeric scholarship.

=== Editors ===
Mette and Thierfelder co-edited the first 27 volumes of Lustrum together until their deaths, which occurred a few days apart from each other in April 1986. Their sudden deaths led to volume 28–29 being published as a combined volume with Hans Gärtner and Hubert Petersmann added as editors, Mette and Thierfelder were listed as editors of this volume posthumously. Gärtner and Petersmann co-edited Lustrum until Petersmann's death in 2001, prior to the publication of volume 41 for the year 1999. Michael Weißenberger began co-editing with Gärtner in 2000, starting with for volume 42. Gärtner stopped co-editing Lustrum in 2011. He retired after working there for twenty-five years due to his age, and Marcus Deufert became his successor at Lustrum. Deufert, Gärtner, and Weißenberger all co-edited volume 53. Irmgard Männlein-Robert became Weißenberger's successor following his retirement; Deufert, Männlein-Robert, and Weißenberger co-edited volume 60 which was Weißenberger's last. As of 2022, Deufert and Männlein-Robert are still Lustrum's editors.

== Indexing and abstracting services ==
Lustrum is indexed in the following bibliographic databases:

- IBZ Online
- Periodicals Index Online
- L'Année philologique
- Linguistic Bibliography
- DIALNET
- Dietrich's Index Philosophicus
- RILM Abstracts of Music Literature

== Reception ==
A 1962 survey of 51 libraries in Great Britain found that 37 of them included Lustrum in their collection. A 1974 review in Reference Services Review called it "one of several highly useful bibliographical tools in the field of Classics", and a 2009 review in Magazines for Libraries said it was "[r]ecommended for libraries that support a strong classics program". Lustrum is also mentioned as a resource in various guides to reference materials for classics and related fields; Fred W. Jenkins described the series in his 2006 book as "quite useful for keeping abreast of the literature on a wide range of authors and topics".

== See also ==
- L'Année philologique
