= Biography Index =

- Discipline: Biography
- Language: English

Publication details
- History: 1946 - present
- Publisher: H. W. Wilson Company (United States)
- Frequency: Quarterly, plus a cumulation

Standard abbreviations
- ISO 4: Biogr. Index

Indexing
- ISSN: 0006-3053
- OCLC no.: 001536408

Biography Index is a bibliographic index that indexes biographical information contained in books and magazines. Its content can also be found in the bibliographic databases Biography Index: Past and Present and Biography Index Retrospective.
