= Sabine R. Huebner =

German university teacher (born 1976)

Sabine Renate Hübner (born 1976) is professor of Ancient History and head of department at the University of Basel in Switzerland. She is an expert on the religious and social history of antiquity, particularly of Greco-Roman Egypt.

== Early life and education ==
Born in Osnabrück (Germany), Huebner studied History and Classics in Münster, Rome, Berlin, Jena, and London (MA Münster, 2001; PhD Jena, 2005; Habilitation FU Berlin, 2010). She received her PhD from the University of Jena in 2005. Her thesis was entitled Der Klerus in der Gesellschaft des spätantiken Kleinasiens (The Clergy in the Society of Late Antique Asia Minor). Her doctoral supervisor was Walter Ameling. After receiving her PhD she was a Postdoc, adjunct assistant professor and visiting research scholar at several research institutions in the United States: at the University of California at Berkeley in 2005; at Columbia University from 2006 to 2009; at the Institute for the Study of the Ancient World (ISAW) in New York City in 2007–2008; and at the Institute for Advanced Study (School of Historical Studies) in Princeton, New Jersey in 2010. In 2011/12, she was a research fellow at the Max Planck Institute for Demographic Research in Rostock, in 2011/12 membre eluée at the "Orient et Méditerranée" at the Collège de France, Paris, and in 2012/13 visiting scholar at the Institutum Romanum Finlandiae and the British School at Rome.

Huebner was awarded research fellowships by the German Research Foundation (2006/7), the German Academic Exchange Service (2003; 2006/7), the Institute for the Study of the Ancient World at NYU (2007/8), the European Research Council (Marie Curie OIF, 2007–2010), and the Max Planck Institute for Demographic Research (2010/11). In 2010 she was awarded a membership at the Institute for Advanced Study (School of Historical Studies) at Princeton, New Jersey. In 2011 she was granted a five-year Heisenberg-Fellowship by the German Research Foundation.

== Career ==
Huebner has published on Roman and later Roman social history, Roman Egypt, early Christianity and the ancient family. At the University of Basel she heads the Department of Ancient Civilizations and the Institute of Ancient History. She is Member of the Board of Trustees of the Association of Members of the Institute for Advanced Study, served as the general secretary of the International Federation of Associations of Classical Studies (FIEC), board member of the Schweizerische Vereinigung für Altertumswissenschaft / Association Suisse pour l'Étude de l'Antiquité ( SVAW/ASEA) and board member of the Schweizerische Patristische Arbeitsgemeinschaft / Groupe suisse d'études patristiques (GSEP) and one of the general editors of the Wiley Encyclopedia of Ancient History (Oxford 2012–2015). From 2023 until 2028 she will be the general editor of the Journal of Late Antiquity.

Huebner has led several projects funded by the Swiss National Science Foundation (SNSF), 1) the edition of the Basel papyrus collection (2015–2018), Egypt at the transition from the Byzantine to early Arab world, 6th to 8th centuries (2016–2019), 3) The Roman Egypt Lab: Climate Change, Societal Transformations, and the Transition to Late Antiquity, 4) the Urban Biographies Project, 5) the Basel Climate Science & Ancient History Lab <https://ancientclimate.philhist.unibas.ch/en/lab/>, and most recently the Roman Villa as Ecosystem: Climate, Production, and Society in the Sabina Tiberina

She was invited visiting professor at the Central European University in 2015, invited Visiting Professor and Stewart Fellow in Religion at Princeton University in 2018, the RD Milns Invited Visiting Professor at the University of Queensland at Brisbane in 2019, a Visiting Professorship (Category A "outstanding researchers or professors") at Università La Sapienza in Rome in 2024, and a 2024-25 Harvard Radcliffe Fellow at the Harvard Radcliffe Institute for Advanced Study.

She has four children with Stéphane Piatzszek, a French screenwriter.

== Bibliography ==
- Huebner, S. R., and Ratzan, D. (eds.) (2021) Missing Mothers. Maternal Absence in Antiquity (= Interdisciplinary Studies in Ancient Culture and Religion 22). (Leuven: Peeters). ISBN 9789042943131.
- Huebner, S. R. (2021) Reise in eine versunkene Welt. Eine Nubienexpedition im Frühjahr 1900. (Schweizerisches Institut für ägyptische Bauforschung und Altertumskunde in Kairo – Sonderschriften — 2). (Gladbeck: PeWe-Verlag). ISBN 978-3-935012-47-8.
- Huebner, S. R. (2020) with W. Graham Claytor, Isabelle Marthot-Santaniello and Matthias Müller (eds.) Papyri of the University Library of Basel (P.Bas. II) (= Archiv für Papyrusforschung und verwandte Gebiete. Beihefte, Band 41). (Berlin: De Gruyter) ISBN 978-3-11-068071-3.
- Huebner, S. R. (2020) with Eugenio Garosi, Isabelle Marthot-Santaniello, Matthias Müller, Stefanie Schmidt and Matthias Stern (eds.) Living the End of Antiquity. Individual Histories from Byzantine to Islamic Egypt. (Millennium-Studien / Millennium Studies, 84). (Berlin: De Gruyter) ISBN 978-3-11-068331-8.
- Huebner, S. R. (2019) Papyri and the Social World of the New Testament (Cambridge, UK: Cambridge University Press)
- Huebner, S. R. and Christian Laes (eds.) (2019) The Single Life in the Roman and Later Roman Worlds (Cambridge, UK: Cambridge University Press)
- Huebner, S. R. and Nathan, G. (eds.) (2016) Mediterranean Families in Antiquity : Households, Extended Families, and Domestic Space (Oxford: Wiley-Blackwell)
- Huebner, S. R. and Caseau, B. (eds.) (2014) Inheritance, law and religions in the ancient and mediaeval worlds, Monographies / Centre de recherche d'histoire et civilisation de Byzance (Paris: ACHCByz)
- Huebner, S. R. (2013) The Family in Roman Egypt. A Comparative Approach to Intergenerational Solidarity and Conflict (Cambridge: Cambridge University Press)
- Bagnall, R. S., Brodersen, K., Champion, C. B., Erskine, A. and Huebner, S. R. (eds.) (2012) The Encyclopedia of Ancient History (Malden: Wiley-Blackwell)
- Huebner, S. R., and Ratzan, D. (eds.) (2009) Growing up Fatherless in Antiquity (Cambridge: Cambridge University Press)
- Huebner, S. R. (2005) Der Klerus in der Gesellschaft des spaetantiken Kleinasiens, Altertumswissenschaftliches Kolloquium (Stuttgart: Franz Steiner)
