= Juliette Ernst =

Swiss classical philologist (1900–2001)

Juliette Ernst (born 12 January 1900 in Algiers; died 28 March 2001 in Lutry, Vaud) was a Swiss classical philologist and editor of L'Année philologique for nearly sixty years. She made a significant contribution to international classical studies as secretary-general of the International Federation of Associations of Classical Studies (Fédération internationale des associations d'études classiques) (FIEC) for twenty-five years. ^{(487)}

== Early life and education ==
Ernst's French-speaking Suisse parents immigrated to Algiers soon after their marriage in 1897. Her mother was Marguerite Muller (1868–1948), who went by the name of Jeanne. Her father was Édouard Ernst (1857–1941), an accountant. ^{(490)} Juliette Ernst studied Classical Philology at the Universities of Lausanne, Geneva and Paris, where she came into contact with Jules Marouzeau. She graduated from the University of Lausanne in 1923 with a licence (a Master's degree) with the highest honours. ^{[491]} She taught French at the École Pratique des Hautes Études in Paris 1925–26, and attended courses by Marouzeau. ^{[491]}

== Career ==
L'Année philologique, the standard bibliographical tool for research in classics, was founded in 1927 by Jules Marouzeau with the assistance of Ernst. Ernst was a member of the editorial team of L’Année philologique, until 1990. Since 1964 she was the editor-in-chief.

From 1942 to 1948 she was a French lecturer at the University of Basel

From 1947 to 1948, Juliette Ernst played a key role in the formation of the Fédération Internationale des Associations d’Études Classiques (FIEC), which was officially founded in Paris on 28 and 29 September 1948. She initially acted as deputy secretary general of the Fédération, then from 1954 to 1974 as secretary general.

== Recognition ==
In 1939, Juliette Ernst was awarded an honorary PhD of her alma mater Lausanne for her achievements. She twice received the Prix Brunet of the Académie des Inscriptions et Belles-Lettres with Marouzeau. ^{[500]}
