= L'Année philologique =

Index to scholarly work

L'Année philologique (The Philological Year) is an index to scholarly work in fields related to the language, literature, history and culture of Ancient Greece and Rome. It is the standard bibliographical tool for research in classical studies. Published in print annually since 1928, with the first volume covering the years 1924–1926, it is now also available online by institutional or individual subscription. As of June 2014, the electronic version (APh Online) covers volume years 1924 through 2011. The editorial staff gathers each year's additions from 1,500 periodicals, with an additional 500 articles from collections.

== Overview ==
L'Année philologique aims to be the most comprehensive international resource for Ancient Greece and Rome. Entries on journal articles are often accompanied by a very brief abstract that may be in a language other than that of the original. Abstracts are most often in French, English, German, Italian, or Spanish. No abstracts for books are provided, but entries on books include a listing of published reviews. Indexing often lags publication by two or three years.

Because L'Année philologique is an index, not a collection, searches find terms only within the bibliographical entry, not the full text of the article (the "full text" search option refers to the contents of L'Année philologique). The electronic edition offers a variety of search parameters, with some idiosyncrasies. Since September 2018, the database is available for library subscription via the commercial publisher Brepols Publishers. Between 2013 and 2018, access was provided by another publisher, EBSCO.

L'Année philologique is published by the Société Internationale de Bibliographie Classique with support from the Centre National de la Recherche Scientifique (CNRS) of France and several other institutions. Editorial offices are located in Chapel Hill, North Carolina; Heidelberg, Germany; Lausanne, Switzerland; Genoa, Italy; and Grenada, Spain. It was founded in Paris by the Latinist Jules Marouzeau (1878–1964), Professor at the Sorbonne. In 1928 Juliette Ernst joined the editorial team of the magazine, of which she was a member until 1990, and from 1964 she was the editor-in-chief.

To fill the gap between L'Année philologique and earlier bibliographies, Marouzeau arranged for the publication of a series of volumes in the same format:

- J. Marouzeau, Dix années de bibliographie classique : bibliographie critique et analytique de l'Antiquité gréco-latine pour la période 1914–1924 (2 vols). Paris: Les Belles Lettres, 1927–1928.
- S. Lambrino, Bibliographie de l'Antiquité classique 1896–1914. Première partie, Auteurs et Textes. Paris: Les Belles Lettres, 1951.

== See also ==
- List of academic databases and search engines
- Lustrum (journal)
