= Conrad Bursian =

German academic, philologist and archaeologist (1830–1883)

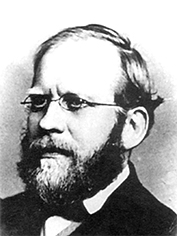
Conrad Bursian

Conrad Bursian (German: [ˈbʊʀziaːn]; 14 November 1830 – 21 September 1883) was a German philologist and archaeologist.

== Biography ==
He was born at Mutzschen in Saxony. When his parents moved to Leipzig, he received his early education at Thomasschule zu Leipzig. From 1847 to 1851 he was a student at the University of Leipzig, where his instructors included Moritz Haupt (1808–1874) and Otto Jahn (1813–1869). He then spent six months in Berlin, where he attended lectures given by August Böckh (1785–1867). In 1852 he completed his university studies at Leipzig, spending the next three years traveling in Belgium, France, Italy and Greece.

In 1856 he obtained his habilitation, and two years later was an associate professor in Leipzig. In 1861 he was appointed professor of philology and archaeology at Tübingen; in 1864 he was a professor of classical antiquities at Zürich. From 1869 at Jena, he was a professor and director of the archaeological museum, and in 1874 he relocated to Munich, where he served as a professor until his death.

== Principal works ==
His favorite classical authors were Aristophanes, Demosthenes, Theocritus and the Greek tragedians; among the Romans, he favoured Lucretius, Juvenal and the Elegiacs. He was editor of the Jahresbericht über die Fortschritte der klassischen Altertumswissenschaft (Annual report on the progress of classical studies), and wrote an outline of Greek art history for Ersch and Gruber's Allgemeine Encyclopädie der Wissenschaften und Künste.

His most important works are:

- Geographie von Griechenland (1862–1872) – Geography of Greece.
- Beiträge zur Geschichte der klassischen Studien im Mittelalter (1873) – Contributions to the history of classical studies in the Middle Ages.
- Geschichte der klassischen Philologie in Deutschland (1883) – History of classical philology in Germany.
- edition of Julius Firmicus Maternus' "De Errore Profanarum Religionum" (1856)
- edition of Seneca the Elder's "Suasoriae" (1857).

== See also ==
- Lustrum (journal), the successor to Bursians Jahresbericht
