= New York Times Index =

1913 index of published articles

The New York Times Index is a printed reference work published since 1913 by The New York Times newspaper. It is intended to serve as a reference for accessing stories printed the previous year in the newspaper. It was created by publisher Adolph Simon Ochs, who wanted to compete with the New York Sun by offering a series of special features. The index, he believed, would be attractive to librarians and other researchers by making reliable source material widely available to the public. The index was the only one published by an American newspaper through at least the 1930s, and helped make the Times known to libraries and students nationwide as a primary source for research.

Initially published quarterly, it was released in annual editions starting in 1930. In recent years, volumes of the index have been designated to cover specific months or weeks. After the success of the index was well established, the Times began publishing the New York Times Obituaries Index. In the 1960s and 1970s, the Times began releasing indexes from before 1913 that had been produced for internal use. This required compiling indexes for the first time for periods 1858-62 and 1906-12 when indexing had halted "for reasons that cannot now be determined," according to the foreword of those volumes. In 2009, the Times began releasing metadata associated with the index to programmers and the general public.
