= Guide to information sources =

Metabibliography

A guide to information sources (or a bibliographic guide, a literature guide, a guide to reference materials, a subject gateway, etc.) is a kind of metabibliography. Ideally it is not just a listing of bibliographies, reference works and other source texts, but more like a textbook introducing users to the information sources in a given field (in general).

Such guides may have many different forms: Comprehensive or highly selective, printed or electronic sources, annotated listings or written chapters etc.

== Functions ==
Often used as curriculum tools for bibliographic instruction, the guides help library users find materials or help those unfamiliar with a discipline understand the key sources.

== Examples ==
- Aby, Stephen H., Nalen, James & Fielding, Lori (2005). Sociology; a guide to reference and information sources. 3rd ed. Westport, Conn.: Libraries Unlimited.
- Adams, Stephen R. (2005). Information Sources in Patents; 2nd ed. (Guides to Information Sources). München: K. G. Saur ISBN 3-598-24443-6
- Blewett, Daniel K (2008). American military history; a guide to reference and information sources. 2nd ed. Westport, CT: Libraries Unlimited.
- Jacoby, JoAnn & Kibbee, Josephine Z. (2007). Cultural anthropology; a guide to reference and information sources. 2nd ed. Westport, Conn.: Libraries Unlimited.
- Schmidt, Diane & Bell, George H. (2003). Guide to reference and information sources in the zoological sciences. Westport, Conn.: Libraries Unlimited.
- O'Hare, Christine (2007). Business Information Sources. London: Library Assn Pub Ltd
- Ostwald, W (1919). Die chemische Literatur und die Organisation der Wissenschaft. Leipzig: W. Ostwald & C. Drucker. (This is considered the first "guide to information sources").
- Stebbins, Leslie F. (2006). Student guide to research in the digital age; how to locate and evaluate information sources. Westport, Conn.: Libraries Unlimited.
- Webb, W. H. et al. (Ed.). (1986). Sources of information in the social sciences. A Guide to the literature. 3. ed. Chicago: American Library Association.
- Zell, Hans M. (ed.). (2003). The African studies companion; a guide to information sources. 3rd rev. and expanded ed. Glais Bheinn: Hans Zell.

== See also ==
- Information literacy
- Information source
- Metabibliography
- Pathfinder (Library Science)
- Reference work

== Literature ==
- Bottle, R. T. (1997). Information science. I: Feather, J. & Sturges, P. (Eds.). International encyclopedia of library and information science. London & New York: Routledge. (pp. 212–214).
- Vileno, L. (2007). From paper to electronic, the evolution of pathfinders: a review of the literature. Reference Services Review. 35(3), 434-451. Også tilgængelig 2009-08-16 fra: http://www.emeraldinsight.com/Insight/ViewContentServlet?contentType=Article&Filename=Published/EmeraldFullTextArticle/Articles/2400350310.html
- Library Trends, 1990, vol 38, issues 3-4, p 453 Google Books
- S Hargitay and S-M Yu. Property Investment Decisions: A Quantitative Approach. Routledge. Page 255
