= Metabibliography =

Bibliography of bibliographies

A metabibliography (or biblio-bibliography) is a bibliography of bibliographies.

While bibliographies serve the finding of relevant documents, metabibliographies serve the finding of the relevant bibliographies in which the relevant documents may be found. One might quote Patrick Wilson: "For if knowledge is power, power over knowledge is power to increase one's power; and if the stock of writings is thought of mainly as it represents a stock of knowledge, it is natural to propose treating it as a "resource" to be subjected to rational control, management and utilization.".

Metabibliographies are valuable for building reference collections, but usually of less interest to the average user, who rely on bibliographies selected by others.

== Examples ==
- Balay, R. (Ed.). (1996). Guide to reference books. 11th ed. Chicago: American Library Association. Now as an online service: Guide to reference (2008–).
- Besterman, T. A. (1965–1966). A world bibliography of bibliographies and of bibliographical catalogues, calendars, abstracts, digests, indexes and the like. 4. Ed. Vol. 1–5. Totowa.
- Bibliographic index. A cumulative bibliography of bibliographies. New York : Wilson, 1938–2011. Vol. 1–. (terminated). Retrieved from: http://www.hwwilson.com/Databases/biblio.htm
- Carroll, B. A.; Fink, C. F. & Mohraz, J. E. (Eds.). (1983). Peace and war. A guide to bibliographies. Santa Barbara, Calif. : ABC-Clio. (War/peace bibliography series. #16 ).
- "Dialindex" (File 411). Dialog. (See Dialog blue sheet: http://library.dialog.com/bluesheets/html/bl0411.html).
- Gale Directory of online, portable, and internet databases. (See: Dialog blue sheet: dialog.com/bluesheets/html/bl0230.html).
- Lester, R. (Ed.). (2005–). The New Walford Guide to reference resources. Vol. 1–3. (Vol. 1, 2005: Science, Technology and Medicine. Vol. 2, 2007: The Social Sciences; Vol. 3, 2013: The Arts: Visual Arts, Music, Language and Literature. (1st edition published 1959).
- Malcles, Louise Noelle (1950). Les sources du travail bibliographique. Geneva: E. Droz. 3 vols. in 4: tome 1. Bibliographies generales; tome 2. Bibliographies specialisees; sciences humaines (2 vols.); tome 3. Bibliographies specialisees; sciences exactes et techniques.
- Totok, W. & Weitzel, R. (Eds.). (1984–1985). Handbuch der bibliographischen Nachschlagewerke. Hrsg. v. Hans-Jürgen und Dagmar Kernchen. 6., erw., völlig neu bearb. Aufl. Frankfurt a.M. : Klostermann. (2 Vols).
- Webb, W. H. et al. (Ed.). (1986). Sources of information in the social sciences. A Guide to the literature. 3. ed. Chicago : American Library Association.

== See also ==
- Bibliographic control
- Guide to information sources (or: Bibliographic guide, literature guide, guide to reference materials subject gateway).
- Wikipedia:List of bibliographies
- List of lists of lists
