= Jules Marouzeau =

French philologist

- Born: March 20, 1878; Fleurat, France
- Died: September 27, 1964 (aged 86); Iteuil, France
- Spouse: Eleonore Mathilde Mariane Fietz (1903)

Jules Marouzeau (20 March 1878 – 27 September 1964) was a French philologist.

== Early life ==
Marouzeau was born on 20 March 1878 to farmer parents Silvain Maurice and Marie Honorine Paquignon. He was able to attend a preparatory school near Paris, Lycée Lakanal, due to scholarships he received. There, he learned Latin.

== Career ==
Marouzeau attended the Sorbonne in Paris working under the linguists Antoine Meillet and Louis Havet. His 1905 dissertation was entitled “La place du pronom personnel sujet en latin” (transl. The place of the personal pronoun in Latin).
