= Athalie =

1691 tragedy by Racine

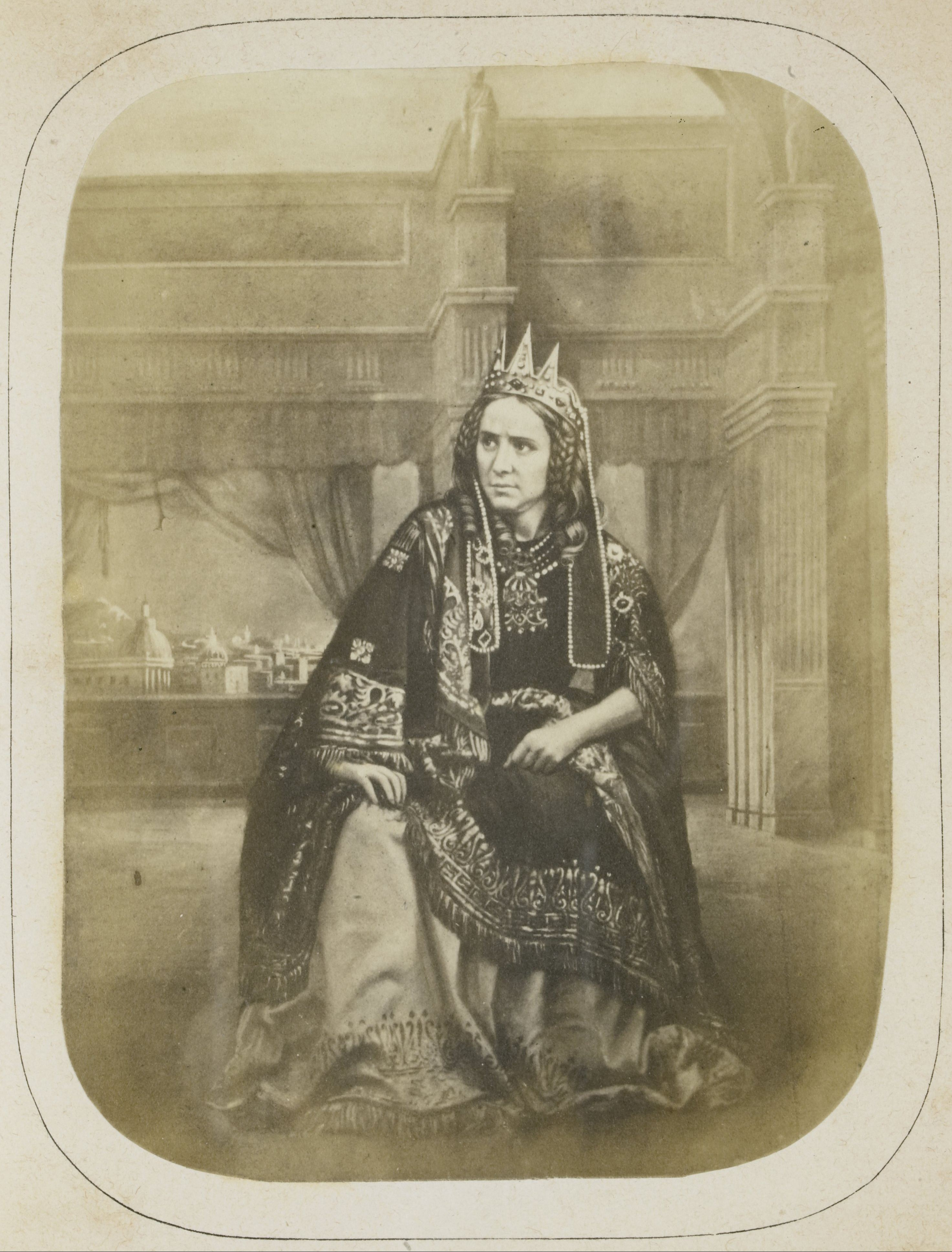
- Actress playing the role of Athalie, 1850s.
- Original language: French
- Written by: Jean Racine
- Chorus: Daughters of the tribe of Levi
- Characters: Athalie; Joad; Josabet; Salomith; Abner; Azartah, Ishmael, priests and Levites; Mathan; Nabal; Agar; Nurse of Joad
- Genre: tragedy
- Setting: Jerusalem Temple, a vestibule of the High Priest's apartment, c. 835 BC

Premiere
- Date: 1691

Athalie ([a.ta.li], sometimes translated Athalia) is a 1691 play, the final tragedy of Jean Racine, and has been described as the masterpiece of "one of the greatest literary artists known" and the "ripest work" of Racine's genius. Charles Augustin Sainte-Beuve deemed it comparable to Oedipus Rex in beauty, with "the true God added." August Wilhelm Schlegel thought Athalie to be "animated by divine breath"; other critics have regarded the poetics of drama in the play to be superior to those of Aristotle.

== History ==
After the success of Esther, Racine published Athalie in 1691, another play drawn from the Bible, which he expected would have the same success.

== Plot ==
Athalie, widow of the king of Judah, rules the country and believes she has eliminated all the rest of the royal family. She has abandoned the Israelite religion for the worship of Baal. However, the late king's grandson Joash was rescued by the wife of the high priest.

- Act 1 - Joad, the Jewish high priest, assures Abner, a military officer, that he would support a possible descendant of the king of Judah if he appeared. Then he agrees with his wife Jehoshebath to reveal the existence of Joash and dethrone Athalie, thus bringing the country back to the true religion.
- Act 2 - Athalie goes into the Jewish temple and finds a baby she has seen in a dream. (She does not know that this child is Joash and that he has been brought up by Joad in the Jewish religion.) She asked Joad to bring the child and she invites him to come to live with her at the palace.
- Act 3 - Fearing a plot by Joad, Athalie wants Joash sent as a hostage. The high priest is preparing to proclaim Joash as king to hasten things.
- Act 4 - Joash reveals he is the descendant and successor of the kings of Judah. The priests barricade the Temple.
- Act 5 - Athalie prepares to dislodge the rebels from the Temple. She comes to claim the child. Joad tells her that the child is Joash. Outside, the attackers panic and flee. Joad executes Athalie.

== Reception ==
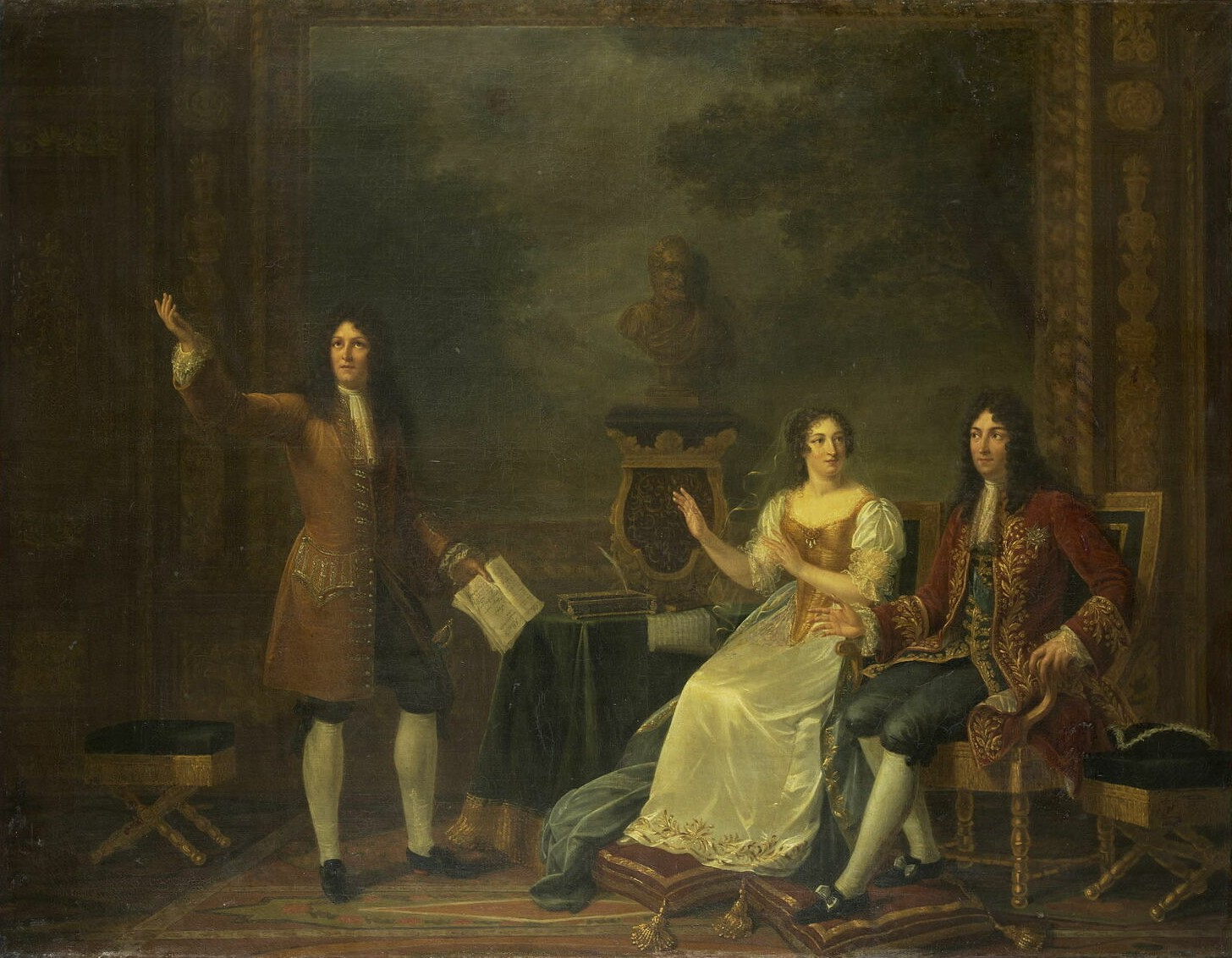
"Racine Reading Athalie Before Louis XIV and Madame de Maintenon", painting by Julie Philipault.

Athalie was the victim of opposition from moralists at its creation. Represented on the public scene after the death of Madame de Maintenon, it was never part of the most popular plays of Racine, though Voltaire saw it as "perhaps the masterpiece of mankind", and Flaubert's character Monsieur Homais, the pharmacist, in Madame Bovary calls it the most "immortal masterpiece of the French stage", and names one of his daughters Athalie.

== Adaptation ==
The oratorio Athalia by George Frideric Handel, with libretto by Samuel Humphreys, was based on Athalie. Richard Franko Goldman adapted the play into an opera libretto for Hugo Weisgall's Athaliah (1964).
