= Athaliah (opera) =

Athaliah is an opera in 2 acts with music by Hugo Weisgall. It uses an English-language libretto by Richard Franko Goldman that is based on the 1691 play Athalie by Jean Racine. The play in turn was based on the murderous Biblical figure Athaliah found in II Kings and II Chronicles. It premiered in a concert version at Philharmonic Hall, New York in 1964 with Shirley Verrett in the title role.

== Plot ==
Athaliah is the daughter of King Ahab and Queen Jezebel and the wife of King Jehoram of Judah. After Jehoram's death, she murders her rival claimants to the thrown and rules the country in the belief that she has eliminated all rival members of the royal family. She abandons the Israelite religion for the worship of Baal.

Meanwhile Athaliah's sister Yehosheba has successfully hidden Joash, the infant son of Ahaziah of Judah and his wife Zibiah. Yehosheba took Joash after seeing the child in a dream which led her to the Jewish temple to find him. She and her husband, the priest Yehohada, raise the child in secret and keep him safe. Ultimately Athaliah discovers the threat of Joash as a rebellion against her rises. The rebels barricade the Jewish Temple, and Athaliah unsuccessfully attempts to dislodge the rebellion. She is ultimately executed by Yehohada after he proclaims Joash as King.

== Composition and performance history ==
Athaliah was commissioned by the Concert Opera Association (COA). Weisgall spent several years creating the score; devoting much of the years 1960 to 1963 to this project. It was given its world premiere by the COA at Philharmonic Hall, New York on February 17, 1964. The opera was divided into two acts and included within them arias, duets, choruses, and a ballet interlude.

At the premiere, conductor Thomas Scherman led the Little Orchestra Society and the singers of COA. While essentially performed in a concert version, the production was semi‐staged by director Edwin Levy and used lighting designed by Richard Casler. The cast in the premiere was led by Shirley Verrett in the title role with Irene Jordan as Yehosheba and John Reardon as Yehohada. Secondary roles were performed by Raymond Michalski (as Ahner), William Lewis (as Mattan), and Scott Kennedy (as Eliakim). The Choral Arts Society served as the opera chorus.

== Music and critical assessment ==
Athaliah was a departure from Weisgall's earlier operas which were more melodically tonal. It was written in a deliberately neoclassical style, and incorporated twelve-tone technique in parts with frequent dissonance. Harold C. Schonberg in his review in The New York Times described the opera as "neo-Lulu". Harold Blumenfeld wrote of the score that "a propulsive, clangorous orchestral background infuses the high points of the work with great excitement." The opera makes extensive use of the chorus. Schonberg noted that the chorus parts had hints of Hebraic liturgy weaved into them. Music critic Douglass Watt stated "What music there is seems to come from its Greek-like chorus which, besides commenting on the scene, expresses the thoughts of the child king."

In 1997, the year of Weisgall's death, Richard Dyer wrote an article in The Boston Globe that stated that "It rankled Weisgall that a work of years, like Athaliah, received only a single concert performance." Blumenfeld championed the work and stated "It is one of the musical scandals of our time that Athaliah — though performed in concert form — has yet to receive a stage premiere. In the context of reviewing Weisgall's wider work, Bruce Saylor assessed Athaliah as "perhaps his masterpiece", and further noted that the character Athalia "brought to culmination his practice of writing [opera] roles" requiring an "overwhelming stage personality".

Athaliah has never been recorded, and no score has been published. However, the Theodore Presser Company holds the copyright to the music and gave access to the score to Saylor so that he could do music analysis in his 1973 journal publication in The Musical Quarterly. The Hugo Weisgall Papers in the collection of the New York Public Library for the Performing Arts contains a reproduction of the vocal and chorus scores for the opera as well as fragments of the piano score.
