= Coronations in antiquity =

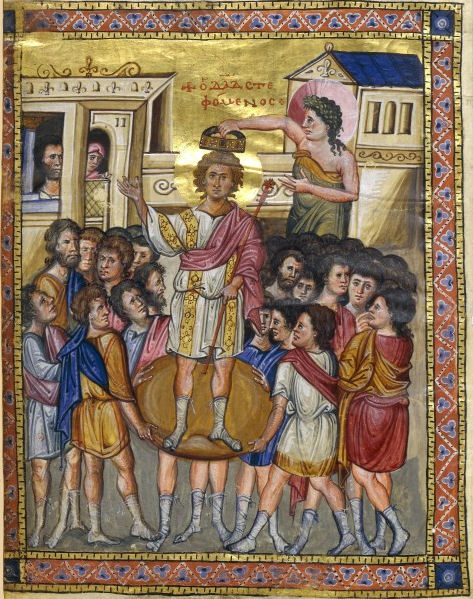
Coronation of King David of Israel, as depicted in the Paris Psalter (10th century).

Historical ceremonies of introducing a new monarch by a ceremony of coronation can be traced to classical antiquity, and further to the Ancient Near East (especially the "Crowns of Egypt").

== Ancient Egypt ==
Pharaohs of Ancient Egypt were believed to be divine. In the coronation ceremony, the pharaoh was transformed into a god by means of his union with the royal ka, or life-force of the soul. All previous kings of Egypt had possessed this royal ka, and at his or her coronation, the monarch became divine as "one with the royal ka when his human form was overtaken by his immortal element, which flows through his whole being and dwells in it". This made him the son of Ra, the sun god, Horus, the falcon god, and Osiris, the god of life, death and fertility. From the Middle Kingdom on, the Pharaoh also came to be seen as the son of Amon, the king of Egyptian gods, until his cult faded in later centuries. At his death, the king became fully divine, according to Egyptian belief, being assimilated with Osiris and Ra.

Upon the death of the reigning Pharaoh, his successor was named immediately, so that the nation's cosmic protection would continue unbroken. While the new monarch ascended the throne the very next day, the coronation ceremony did not take place until the first day of a new season, thus symbolising the beginning of a new era. The ceremony was usually carried out at Memphis by the high priest, who invested the new king with the necessary powers to continue his predecessors' work.

As a permanent reminder to his people of his divine birthright, the Pharaoh wore various elements of royal regalia that varied depending upon the particular period in Egyptian history. Among these were a false beard made from goat's hair, identifying him with the god Osiris; a sceptre shaped like a shepherd's crook known as a Heka, which meant "ruler" and was often associated with magic; and a fly whip called the Nekhakha, symbol of his power and authority. The new monarch also wore a Shemset apron, while his back was protected by a bull's tail hanging from his belt, symbolic of strength, though this was later done away with. He was invested with a crown during his coronation: depending on the historic period, the king might have been given the White Crown, or Hedjet (the crown of Upper Egypt), the Deshret or Red Crown (diadem of Lower Egypt), the Pschent or Sekhemti (the Double Crown, combining the White and the Red Crowns), the Nemes or striped headcloth, or the Khepresh or Blue Crown. The Pschent was generally used for the highest state occasions, and was conferred on all Pharaohs from at least the First Dynasty on. When the Hedjet was combined with red Ostrich feathers of the Osiris cult, the resulting diadem was referred to as the Atef crown.

== Hebrew Bible ==
According to the Hebrew Bible, Kings in Biblical Israel were crowned and anointed, most often by (or at the behest of) a prophet or high priest. In I Samuel 10:1, the prophet Samuel anoints Saul to be Israel's first king, though there is no record of his being crowned. However, on Saul's death, a crown that was on his head is presented to David II Samuel 1:10. Later, in I Samuel 16:13, Samuel anoints David to replace him - but again there is no reference to a crown at that point. In II Samuel 12:30, David is crowned with the Ammonite crown, after his conquest of Rabbah, the Ammonite capital. II Kings 9:1-6 tells of the anointing of Jehu as king of Israel. Esther 2:17 relates the crowning of Esther as consort of Ahasuerus, king of Persia.

A detailed account of a coronation in ancient Judah is found in II Kings 11:12 and II Chronicles 23:11, in which the seven-year-old Jehoash is crowned in a coup against the usurper Athaliah. This ceremony took place in the doorway of the Temple in Jerusalem. The king was led to "his pillar", "as the manner was", where a crown was placed upon his head, and "the testimony" given to him, followed by anointing at the hands of the high priest and his sons. Afterwards, the people "clapped their hands" and shouted "God save the King" as trumpets blew, music played, and singers offered hymns of praise. All of these elements would find their way in some form or another into future European coronation rituals after the conversion of Europe to Christianity many centuries later, and all Christian coronation rites continue to borrow from these examples.

== Classical antiquity ==
=== Ancient Persia ===
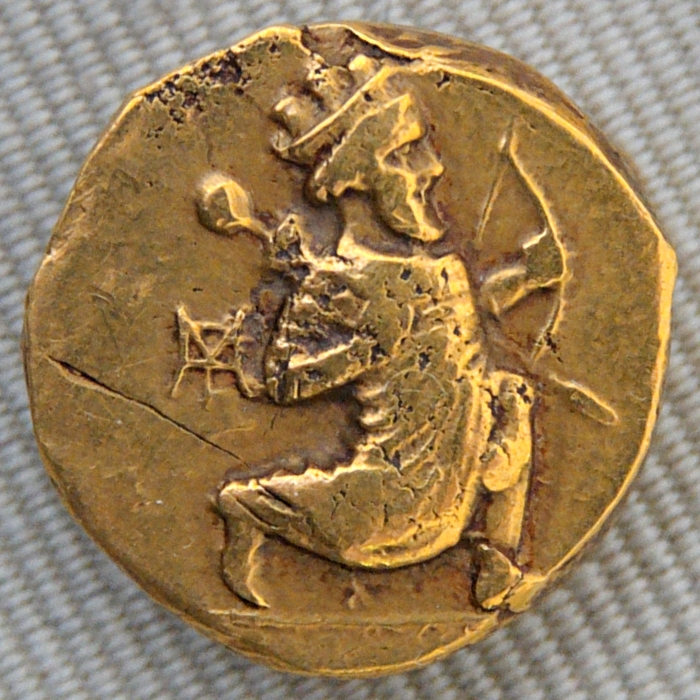
Double daric of Artaxerxes II, Babylonia, 4th century BC: the Persian king running, holding a bow.

Plutarch wrote in his Life of King Artaxerxes that the Persian king was required to go to the ancient capital of Pasargadae for his coronation ceremony. Once there, he entered a temple "to a warlike goddess, whom one might liken to Artemis" (whose name is unknown today, nor can this temple be located), and there divested himself of his own robe, substituting the one worn by Cyrus I at his crowning. After this, he had to consume a "frail" of figs, eat turpentine and drink a cup of sour milk. Plutarch observed that "if they add any other rites, it is unknown to any but those that are present at them".

=== Classical Greece and Hellenistic era ===
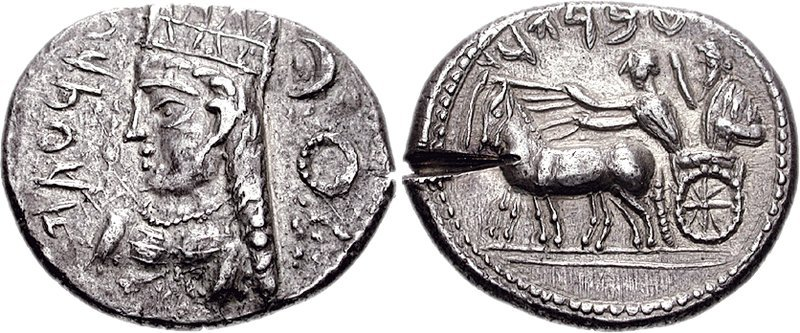
A Didrachm of Bambyce, dated c. 342-331 BC, with a bust of Atargatis wearing a turreted crown.

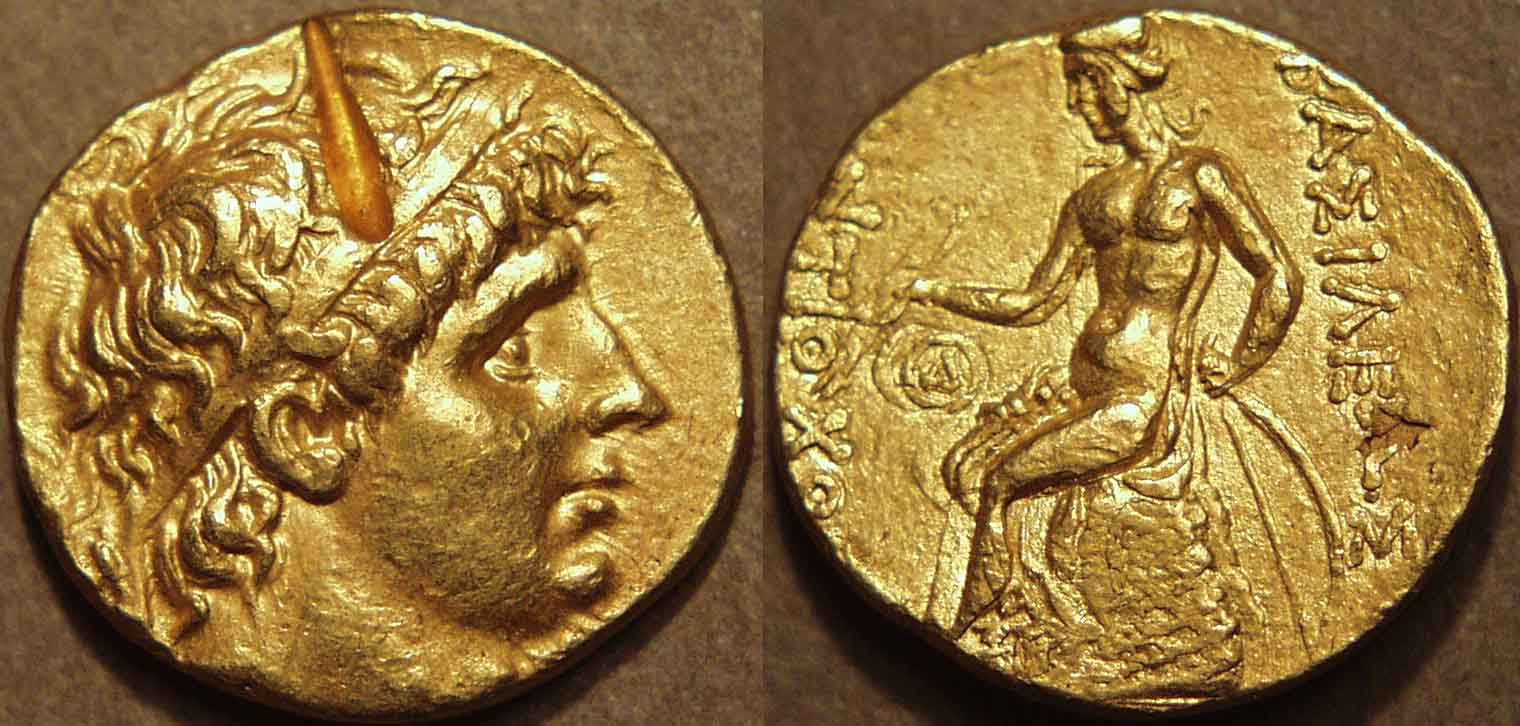
Antiochus I Soter wearing a diadem.

The depiction of crowned heads on the obverse of coins becomes widespread from the 4th century onward. At first, these depict mainly deities, not kings, e.g. the Mother of Gods wearing the turreted crown (Rhea-Kybele is often depicted wearing the "turret crown", and is also given the title of Mater turrita by Ovid), Athena wearing a crowned helmet, or Zeus wearing a laurel wreath.

In the early 3rd century BC, the Seleucid rulers begin to depict their own portraits on their coins, typically wearing a headband or diadem.

The Book of Revelation in the New Testament makes extensive use of the crown motif, associating it with shared rulership for the saints in heaven (2:10, 3:11, 4:4) conquering (6:2) and ultimate rulership (14:14, 19:12). This suggests that the association was clearly understood in the Graeco-Roman world.

=== Roman era ===
The original status of the Roman emperors was in contrast to the kings of Rome who were expelled in the early years of the city, paving the way for a republic. Therefore, the Emperors were traditionally acclaimed by the Senate or by a legion speaking for the armies as a whole, and were subsequently confirmed without any special ritual. The Eastern diadem was later introduced by Aurelian, but did not truly become part of the imperator's regalia until the reign of Constantine. Prior to this, Roman sovereigns wore the purple paludamentum, and sometimes a laurel wreath as emblems of their office. Aurelian strengthened the position of Sol Invictus, whose corona radiata or "radiant crown" had become popular in depictions of emperors earlier in the 3rd century (Gordian III) with the development of the imperial cult. Emperor Diocletian (r. 285-305) greatly developed the ceremony surrounding the Roman Emperor; the quasi-republican ideals of Augustus' primus inter pares were abandoned for all but the Tetrarchs themselves. Diocletian took to wearing a gold crown and jewels, and forbade the use of purple cloth to all but the Emperors.

Constantine the Great reverted to the diadem (while he still was depicted alongside Sol Invictus, he was no longer shown as Sol Invictus). Following the assumption of the diadem by Constantine, future Roman and Byzantine emperors continued to wear it as the supreme symbol of their authority. Although no specific coronation ceremony was observed at first, one gradually evolved over the next century. The emperor Julian was hoisted upon a shield and crowned with a gold necklace provided by one of his standard-bearers; he later wore a jewel-studded diadem. Future emperors were crowned and acclaimed in a similar manner, until the momentous decision was taken to permit the Patriarch of Constantinople to physically place the crown on the emperor's head. Historians debate exactly when this first took place, but the precedent was clearly established by the reign of Leo II, who was crowned by the Patriarch Acacius in 473. This ritual included recitation of prayers by the Byzantine prelate over the crown, a further—and extremely vital—development in the liturgical ordo of crowning. After this event, according to the Catholic Encyclopedia, "the ecclesiastical element in the coronation ceremonial rapidly develop[ed]".

== Transition to the Middle Ages ==
The Byzantine coronation ritual, from at least 795 on, incorporated a partial clothing of the new emperor in various items of special clothing prior to his entrance to the church, following which he entered the cathedral and received the prostrations of the Senators and other patricians. The Patriarch then read a set of lengthy prayers, as the sovereign was invested first with the chlamys and then finally with the crown. Following this, the emperor received Holy Communion followed by further acts of homage. From the moment of his coronation, Byzantine emperor was regarded as holy; while the Patriarch was holding the crown over the emperor's head, the attending people repeatedly cried: Holy!

In later centuries, after receiving their crown from the Patriarch, Byzantine emperors placed it upon their own head, symbolizing that their dominion came directly from God. Anointing was added to the ritual after the eleventh century, with the monarch receiving the Sign of the Cross on their forehead from the Patriarch. The purple chlamys also disappeared from the rite during this time, being replaced with the mandyas, or cope.

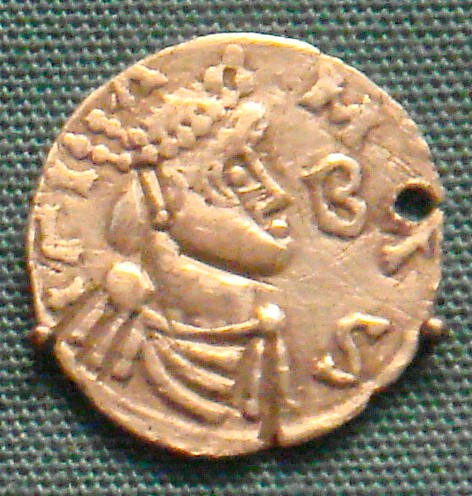
Childebert III (r.694-711).

The Byzantine coronation ceremony begins to influence the Barbarian kingdoms in the West with their Christianization. The Iron Crown of Lombardy is traced in legend to Constantine himself (but more likely dates to the 8th or 9th century). In Spain, the Visigothic king Sisenand was crowned in 631, and in 672, Wamba was the first occidental king to be anointed as well, by the archbishop of Toledo.

Two prayers for the coronation of Byzantine emperors are found in the Byzantine Archieratikon (Slavonic: Chinovnik). The second of these prayers is proceeded by the diaconal command: "Bow your heads to the Lord" and the assembly's response: "To you, O Lord." This pattern of two prayers corresponds to the ritual form found in the Byzantine liturgy for the ordinations of bishops, priests and deacons and also for major blessings, such as the Great Blessing of Waters on the Feast of the Theophany. In some texts, the first prayer is associated with the act of clothing the emperor in the chlamys and the second with the act of crowning him. Although the Byzantine coronation ritual underwent various changes throughout the centuries, these two prayers are found consistently in every version. They also occur in the Russian ritual for the crowning of the Tsar, beginning with Ivan IV, and also in the ritual for the coronation of an emperor beginning with that of Catherine I.
