= Lives of the Prophets =

Ancient account of the lives of the Old Testament prophets

The Lives of the Prophets is an apocryphal set of manuscripts written largely in Greek during middle antiquity as an interpretation of the lives of the prophets of the Hebrew Bible. The work is not regarded as scripture by any Jewish or Christian denomination. The work may have been known by the author of some of the Pauline epistles, as there are similarities in the descriptions of the fates of the prophets, although without naming the individuals concerned.

Start of the Lives in a 13th-century manuscript now in Vienna

== Manuscript iterations ==
The work survives only in Christian manuscripts. There are two groups of Greek manuscripts: the first group includes many versions, well known in the past centuries, with heavy Christian additions. Some of these versions were attributed to Epiphanius of Salamis, others to Dorotheus of Tyre. The other group of Greek manuscripts is more stable and free from the interpolations found in the previous group: the best codex is a 6th-century CE manuscript usually referred to as Q or as anonymous recension, which is the earliest Greek version of this work. There is also a Latin version (Vitae prophetarum) with a text near to Q used by Isidore of Seville (before 636 CE). There are also versions in Syriac, Armenian, Ethiopic and Arabic. There are an abundance of Greek manuscripts, the most important of these are the following:

- Codex Marchalianus, Codex Vaticanus Gr. 2125, sixth century, in the Vatican Library;
- Codex Paris. Gr. 1115, copied in 1276, now in the Bibliothèque Nationale in Paris: it is the chief witness for the longer of the two recensions attributed to Epiphanius of Salamis;
- Codex Coisl. 120, tenth century, Bibliothèque Nationale (Fonds Coislin), Paris: it is the leading representative of the short attributed to Epiphanius;
- Codex Vindob. Theol. Gr. 40 (formerly 77), thirteenth century, Vienna: it is the best example of the recension attributed to Dorotheus;
- Codex Coisl. 224, tenth century, Bibliothèque Nationale (Fond Coislin), Paris: it is a member of the "anonymous recension".

== Original language and date ==
There is no consensus among scholars about the original language but the prevalent use of Greek language quotations from the Septuagint suggests a Greek original work with some semitic coloring.

Authenticating the dating is highly problematic due to the Christian transmission and presumed expansions. Torrey suggests a date before 106 CE. Hare the first quarter of the 1st century CE. Satran proposes an early Byzantine origin in the 4th-5th century on previous materials. But the date must be before the 5th century, as Torrey writes in his Introduction that the Lives "exists in several different rescensions. Of these, the most familiar is the one which appears in the works of Epiphanius, Bishop of Salamis in Cyprus (fourth century)".

== Content ==
The manuscript begins with an accounting of what it attempts to contain: The names of the prophets, and where they are from, and where they died and how, and where they lie.

The Lives of the Prophets includes apocryphal exegis concerning the lives of 23 prophets. The main allegations indicated in these manuscripts are the following:

- Isaiah: said to be of Jerusalem, suffered martyrdom by being sawn in two by Manasseh (in agreement with the Martyrdom of Isaiah), buried near a place usually identified by scholars as the Pool of Siloam.
- Jeremiah: said to be of Anathoth (Jeremiah 1:1), suffered martyrdom by stoning at Tahpanhes in Ancient Egypt where he was also buried. It is said that who prayed with faith over the seer's grave is healed from asps bites. His remains were later moved to Alexandria. Before the First Temple was destroyed, Jeremiah hid miraculously in the rock the Ark of the Covenant.
- Ezekiel: said to be of Arira and to be of a priesthood family. He suffered martyrdom in the land of the Chaldeans and was buried in the grave of Shem and Arpachshad. A description of the grave is given. Same stories of Ezekiel in the Babylonian captivity are then narrated.
- Daniel: said to be of the Tribe of Judah and born at Beth Horon. He is described as a man devoted to fast and prayer, and the story, full of miraculous details, of Nebuchadrezzar's conversion is narrated.
- Hosea: said to be of the Tribe of Issachar and born at Belemot where he was buried.
- Micah: said to be of the Tribe of Ephraim. He suffered martyrdom by Jehoram and buried in his land near the cemetery of the Anakim.
- Amos: said to be born in Tekoa (Amos 1:1), tortured by Amaziah (the priest of Beth-el of Amos 7:10) and martyred by the son of this one. He laid in his birth-land.
- Joel: said to be of the Tribe of Reuben, born and buried in Bethomoron.
- Obadiah: said to be born in Beth-acharam in the land of Sichem.
- Jonah: said to be born in the land of Kariathmos near the Greek town of Azotus. After his predication in Nineveh he went to live with his mother in Sur. He returned in Judea, died, and was buried in the cave of Kenaz (the one referred to in Genesis 36:11).
- Nahum: said to be of Elkesi (Nahum 1:1), in front of Isbergabin of the Tribe of Simeon. He died in peace and was buried in his land.
- Habakkuk: said to be from the land of Bethzuchar and of the Tribe of Simeon. After the fall of Jerusalem he went to live in the land of Ishmael and then returned to help the Hebrews who remained. He later went in Babylonia during the Babylonian captivity where he met Daniel. He died two years before the end of the captivity and was buried in his land.
- Zephaniah: said to be from the land of Sabaratha and of the Tribe of Simeon. He was buried in his land.
- Haggai: said to come in Jerusalem from Babylonia when he was young, and he saw the reconstruction of the Temple. He was buried near the graves of the priests (probably in the Kidron Valley).
- Zechariah: said to come in Jerusalem from Babylonia when already old. He blessed both Jozadak (the father of Joshua) and Zerubbabel. He died old and was buried near Haggai.
- Malachi: said to be born in Sofa. He died young and was buried with his fathers.
- Nathan: said to be from Gaba. He taught the Torah to David. Beliar prevented Nathan from being able to keep David from killing Bathsheba's husband. He died very old and was buried in his land.
- Ahijah the Shilonite (1 Kings 11:29): said to be from Shiloh. He was buried near the oak of Shiloh.
- Joad or Ioad (named Jadon in Antiquities of the Jews VIII,8,5 and referred to as the man of God in 1 Kings 13:1): said to be of Samareim and was buried as told in 2 Kings 23:18.
- Azariah (2 Chronicles 15:1): said to be from the land of Subatha. He was buried in his land.
- Elijah the Tishbite: said to be from the land of the Arabs, of the tribe of Aaron that was in Gilead. The birth of Elijah was miraculous: when he was to be delivered, his father Sobacha saw white figures of man who greeted him, wrapped him up and fed him with flames.
- Elisha: said to be of Abelmaul (1 Kings 19:16) in the land of Reuben. When he was born a calf of gold screamed so loudly it was heard in Jerusalem. He was buried in Samaria.
- Zechariah ben Jehoiada (2 Chronicles 24:20–22): said to be of Jerusalem, he was killed by Jehoash near the altar of the Temple. He was buried near his father Jehoiada. After his death, the priests of the Temple could no more, as before, see the apparitions of the angels of the Lord, nor could make divinations with the Ephod, nor give responses from the Debir.

Since the work is found in Christian manuscripts, some New Testament prophets are typically appended, specifically Zachariah, Symeon, and John the Baptist. Symeon is reported as dying of old age, while Zachariah is said to have been killed by Herod "between the temple and the altar," per Jesus' words in Matthew 23:35 and Luke 11:51.

== Themes ==
The anonymous author of the Lives of the Prophets displays a greater focus on miracles, intercessions, and predictions which he attributes to the prophets, over an authorial interest in the prophets’ Israelite ethical teachings codified in the Hebrew Bible itself. One of the more typical themes of the Lives of the Prophets revolves around the author’s interest in the prophets’ burial places. Jeremias in his study examines both archaeological and literary clues, in particular the Herod architectural activity, and in later chronology, content by Christian gospel authors, i.e., Matthew 23:29 and Luke 11:47, and he considers the Lives an indicator of developing gentile interest in the 1st century. A repeated theme of the author is martyrdom, as six of the Hebrew prophets who lived centuries to a millennium prior are alleged in the Greek manuscripts to have been martyred. Also contained in this apocrypha is the theme of prophets as intercessors for those gentiles living in an era long after the Israelite prophets’ deaths.

== See also ==
- Apocrypha
