= Irene Jordan =

- Born: April 25, 1919; Birmingham, Alabama
- Died: May 13, 2016 (aged 97); Dalton, Massachusetts
- Other name: Irene Caplan
- Education: Judson College; Juilliard School
- Occupations: Concert and opera singer; voice teacher
- Spouse: Arnold Caplan (died 1997)
- Children: 4

Irene Jordan, also known by her married name Irene Caplan, (April 25, 1919 – May 13, 2016) was an American concert and opera singer. She initially trained as a contralto at Judson College, but after studying music further in New York City began a professional career as a mezzo-soprano. She performed in light operas in regional theatre and on Broadway prior to working as a mezzo at the Metropolitan Opera from 1946 to 1948. After marrying the violinist Arnold Caplan, she retrained her voice as a soprano. She performed in operas and in concerts as a soprano from the 1950s through the 1990s. She was also active as a voice teacher at several institutions, including teaching on the voice faculty of the Eastman School of Music.

== Early life ==
Irene Jordan was born in Birmingham, Alabama on April 25, 1919. She had three brothers and six sisters. Her father, Eugene Jordan, was director of the Birmingham–Southern Band and the Alabama Boys' Industrial School Band. Her mother, Sara Ann Jordan (nee Whitehurst) was a violin teacher. She was interested in becoming an opera singer from the time she was five years old. As a child she studied piano in Birmingham with Mrs. George P. Dupree and Mrs. Ethel Coffin King. She would occasionally perform as an amateur at public events and recitals as a child with her older sister Martha. She was also active as an amateur musician in her growing up years with the Bush Hills Juvenile Music Club. She attended Ruhama Baptist Church in Birmingham.

Jordan was educated at Barrett School (now Barrett Elementary School), and as a violinist served as concertmaster of Barrett's orchestra by the time she was in the seventh grade. She graduated from Barrett with her 8th grade diploma in May 1931. In December 1931 she participated in a group recital at the Birmingham Conservatory of Music where she then a piano student. In May 1932 she served as accompanist to her mother's violin students at a group recital presented by the pupils of the First National Institute of Violin where he mother was a teacher.

== Education in Alabama ==
Jordan attended Woodlawn High School (WHS). There she was performed in school plays. In April 1935 she performed the role of Susan Sowerby in Birmingham Children's Theatre production of The Secret Garden. She graduated from WHS with honors at the end of 1934-1935 academic year. In June 1935 she won first prize in a scholarship contest which paid for her tuition at Judson College (JC). There she majored in both voice and drama. In October 1935 she joined a newly formed chancel choir at JC which was organized by voice professor Ivan B. Rasmussen. She was also a member of the school's glee club.

At JC, Jordan was initially trained as a contralto by Rasmussen who was her primary voice teacher. Rasmussen had studied singing with Herbert Witherspoon. Jordan performed as a contralto soloist with school ensembles. In the spring of 1936 she performed in JC's production of the play Quality Street. She was on the editorial staff of JC's newspaper, The Triangle in 1937-1938. In the Spring of 1938 she portrayed Charlotte Brontë in JC's production of Dan Totheroh's Moor Born, and performed the lead part of The Chronicler in Within a Century; a pageant created to honor the centennial of the founding of JC. Years later she returned to JC to sing at both the 125th and 150th anniversary celebrations of the college.

In May 1938 Jordan won first prize in the Alabama Federation of Music Clubs competition. By her senior year at JC, she was billed as a soprano in public recitals with Rasmussen as her accompanist; although she was still labeled a contralto in her senior student recital in March 1939. In December 1938 she portrayed roles in two JC productions" Kaye in the play Stage Door and Hansel in the opera Hansel and Gretel.

Jordan graduated from JC with magna cum laude honors in June 1939. After graduating she joined the voice faculty at JC as an assistant voice professor. She was appointed conductor of the College Chorus in the fall of 1939. She continued to study singing while teaching at JC with voice teacher Frank Cheesman. She gave a faculty recital in April 1940.

== Studies in New York and early career ==
After teaching one year at JC, Jordan relocated to New York City to continue her vocal training. She studied in New York with Clytie Hine Mundy while working on the music staff at the Church of the Epiphany as a in-house contralto soloist. She also took choral conducting classes at the Juilliard School taught by Peter Wilhousky, and studied opera ensemble work with John Mundy. Mundy was the long time orchestral manager of the Metropolitan Opera ("the Met").

Jordan returned to Alabama when she was appointed a voice professor at JC for the 1942-1943 academic year; stepping in for Frank Cheesman who had been drafted. She was appointed head of the voice department, and was conductor for both the chancel choir and glee club. She returned to New York after completing this academic year. She performed as a member of the chorus the 1943-1944 Broadway production of Lehar's The Merry Widow at the Majestic Theatre. In March 1944 she was a finalist in the voice competition held by the Walter W. Naumburg Foundation.

In the summer of 1944 she performed in multiple operettas at the Paper Mill Playhouse in New Jersey; portraying Nellie in Gustav Luders's The Prince of Pilsen' one of the ballet students in Victor Herbert's The Fortune Teller with Rosemarie Brancato in the title role; and a supporting role in The Desert Song. She returned to Broadway in the 1944-1945 season as Mary Jane in Elie Siegmeister and Walter Kerr's musical Sing Out, Sweet Land at the International Theatre.

After this she returned to Birmingham where she accepted a position as a church singer at Norwood Methodist Church in May 1945. That same year she performed with Birmingham's Starlight Opera company as Geraldine Van Dare in The Firefly and Huguette in The Vagabond King. She returned to New York in the autumn of 1945 to resume her vocal studies, this time with Kurt Adler. She was active as a volunteer performer at the Stage Door Canteen during World War II.

== Mezzo at the Metropolitan Opera and marriage ==
In 1946 Jordan successfully auditioned for NBC Radio and was given her own radio show, Songs by Irene. She left this program after being unexpectedly offered a contract with the Met for the 1946-1947 season. Lily Pons was responsible for this opportunity. Pons had demanded that the mezzo-soprano originally scheduled to perform with her in Delibes' Lakmé be replaced by someone with a lighter voice, and the Met responded by hiring Jordan. On November 11, 1946 Jordan made her Met debut as Mallika to Pons's Lakmé.

Jordan was a Met regular for three seasons; singing under contract at the Met as a mezzo-soprano at this period in her career. In January 1947 she created the role of the Boy in the world premiere of Bernard Rogers and Norman Corwin's The Warrior at the Metropolitan Opera House. Other roles she sang at the Met included Feodor in Boris Godunov, First Genii in The Magic Flute, an orphan in Der Rosenkavalier, the page in Rigoletto, Kate Pinkerton in Madama Butterfly, the Second Esquire and a Flower Maiden in Parsifal, the Shepherd in Tosca, and Blanche in Louise.

In June 1947 Jordan married Met violinist Arnold Caplan. Her decision to marry a violinist in the Met's orchestra angered the Met's management, including its director Edward Johnson. This paired with her interest in retraining her voice as a soprano further soured her relationship with the Met's leaders. While she was under contract with the company for the 1948-1949 season, it was not renewed after this. After leaving the Met she spent the next several years retraining her voice in the soprano repertoire. During this period her son Joel and her daughter Rosebeth were born.

== Career as a soprano ==
=== 1950s ===
In January 1952 Jordan made her debut as a soprano with the Rochester Philharmonic Orchestra performing the role of Gilda in Verdi's Rigoletto. Later that year she portrayed Vitellia in Mozart's La clemenza di Tito under the baton of Sarah Caldwell at the Tanglewood Music Festival (TMF) in what was billed as the opera's United States premiere. She was also a soloist at the 1952 TMF in Arthur Honegger's La Danse des Morts with the Boston Symphony Orchestra under Charles Munch with fellow soloists including Richard Sharretts and Betty Allen.

In 1953 she sang the role of Eglantine von Puiset in Euryanthe with the Little Orchestra Society (LOS) at Carnegie Hall (CH). In March 1954 she was a soloist in Beethonven's Symphony No. 9 with conductor Erich Leinsdorf, the Rutgers University Choir, and the Rochester Philharmonic Orchestra at CH. A month earlier she made her debut with the Lyric Opera of Chicago (LOC; then called the Lyric Theater of Chicago) at the Civic Opera House as Donna Elvira in Mozart's Don Giovanni with Nicola Rossi-Lemeni in the title role and Eleanor Steber as Donna Anna. In November 1954 she returned to the LOC to portray both Micaela in Bizet's Carmen and Katharina in Giannini's The Taming of the Shrew with conductor Nicola Rescigno. She was a soloist in excerpts from Così fan tutte with the Brooklyn Philharmonic at the Brooklyn Academy of Music in 1955.

After a long absence, Jordan returned to the Met in March 1957 to perform the Queen of the Night in Mozart's The Magic Flute; a role she had performed a year earlier at the Royal Opera House in London under conductor Rafael Kubelík. In August 1957 she performed the role of Santuzza in Cavalleria rusticana at the St. Louis Municipal Opera; a role she had previously sung with the Fort Worth Opera in 1953. In the fall of 1957 she performed the role of Lady Macbeth in Verdi's Macbeth with the New York City Opera with Arturo Basile conducting.

In the summer of 1958 she was the soprano soloist in Beethonven's Symphony No. 9 with the Lewisohn Stadium Symphony and Margaret Hillis' American Concert Choir at Lewisohn Stadium (ST) under conductor Josef Krips with 14,000 people in attendance. In November 1958 she was a soloist in Domenico Cimarosa's Requiem given at The Town Hall with Newell Jenkins and the Clarion Music Society in what was believed to be its United States premiere of the work.

In 1959 Jordan was awarded a grant from the Ford Foundation; an award which enabled her to pursue further music studies at both the Eastman School of Music and Northwestern University. She starred as Leonore in a televised version of Beethoven's Fidelio with the NBC Opera Theatre. In the summer of 1959 she sang the roles of Olympia, Giulietta and Antonia in a concert performance of Offenbach's The Tales of Hoffmann given at LS under music director Thomas Scherman with Robert Rounseville in the title role. She also performed in the concert "Shakespeare and Music" at the Stratford Festival in Canada in August 1959.

=== Later performances ===
In March 1960 she sang Beatrice in Béatrice et Bénédict with the LOS at CH. In December 1960 she sang the role of the Virgin Mary in Berlioz's L'Enfance du Christ with the Choral Arts Society and the LOS under conductor Thomas Scherman. In the spring of 1961 she portrayed the title role in Verdi's Aida in a professional production given at Stephens College in Missouri; having previously appeared there as Lakmé in 1960. In October 1961 she was a soloist in Darius Milhaud's Les Choéphores with the New York Philharmonic led by Leonard Bernstein at CH.

In January 1962 she was a soloist in Bach's Wär Gott nicht mit uns diese Zeit, BWV 14 and Wachet auf, ruft uns die Stimme, BWV 140 with the Bach Aria Group led by Frank Brieff at The Town Hall. The following April she performed the role of Leonore in Beethoven's Fidelio in a concert version of the opera with the Baltimore Symphony Orchestra. In the summer of 1963 she sang excerpts Verdi's Macbeth at LS. In November 1963 she sang the role of Irene in a semi-staged production of Wagner's Rienzi with the Concert Opera Association (COA) at Philharmonic Hall, New York (PHNY) under conductor Thomas Scherman.

In January 1964 she performed the role of Elena (aka Giovanna de Guzman) in Verdi's I vespri siciliani with COA at PHNY with Scherman leading the LOS. On February 17, 1964 she sang the role of Yehosheba in the world premiere of Hugo Weisgall's Athaliah with Shirley Verrett in the title role. It was given in a semi-staged production at PHNY by COA and the LOS under Scherman. In the summer of 1964 she was a soloist in Mendelssohn's A Midsummer Night's Dream at the Hollywood Bowl with Agnes Moorehead as the narrator and Franz Waxman conducting. In November 1964 she sang the title role in the United States premiere of Donizetti's Maria Stuarda with COA which was also semi-staged at PHNY with Scherman and the LOS.

In 1965 Jordan portrayed Donna Anna in Don Giovanni with the Los Angeles Opera, and performed the title role in a staged production of Madama Butterfly with the Phoenix Symphony. She had previously sung Butterfly with the St. Louis Municipal Opera in 1960 with Walter Cassel as Sharpless, and later performed the role with the Tri-City Symphony in 1966. In April 1968 she was a soloist in Verdi's Requiem with the Sacramento Symphony in concert honoring Martin Luther King Jr. shortly after his assassination. In December 1968 she was the soprano soloist in the world premiere of Cristóbal Halffter and Norman Corwin's cantata Yes, Speak Out Yes which was performed at General Assembly Hall at the Headquarters of the United Nations and was filmed for live television broadcast.

In 1971 Jordan was a soloist with the Brooklyn Philharmonic and conductor Siegfried Landau during the orchestra's Beethoven Festival. That same year she portrayed the Queen of Sheba in Handel's Solomon Handel Society of New York (HSNY) led by conductor Stephen Simon at CH with John Shirley-Quirk in the title role. She later performed the role of Merab in Handel's Saul with the HSNY at CH in 1973. Donald Gramm sang the title role in this concert with Maureen Forrester as David. She performed Euridice in Gluck's Orfeo ed Euridice with the LOS led by Scherman at Avery Fisher Hall. Mignon Dunn was Orfeo in this production.

In 1985 Jordan was a soloist with the New York Saxophone Quartet at the Mohawk Trail Concerts (MTC) in Massachusetts. Her final professional public performance was at MTC in 1999. She was 80 years old at this time, and a CD of live recordings during the prime of her career was released that year by Dynamite Records. In 2004 she gave a recital at Plainfield Congregational Church in Plainfield, Massachusetts.

She recorded Stravinsky's Pulcinella with the Columbia Symphony Orchestra led by the composer.

== Teaching career and later life ==
Jordan taught on the voice faculty at Northwestern University in the 1960s. In 1969 she joined the voice faculty at the Eastman School of Music; teaching on the staff of their summer opera program. She later taught voice at King's College in New York City; giving a faculty recital there in 1973. In 1977 she returned to JC as a visiting professor at her alma mater; also giving a faculty recital at the school.

Jordan's husband Arnold died in 1997 at the age of 81. They had one daughter and three sons. In 2006 JC had an alumni luncheon organized to honor her at which she sang. At this event JC's president, David Potts, described her as "Arguably the most well-known and highly-acclaimed Judson alumna of the 20th century". She died on May 13, 2016 in Dalton, Massachusetts.
