= Zechariah ben Jehoiada =

Figure in the Hebrew Bible

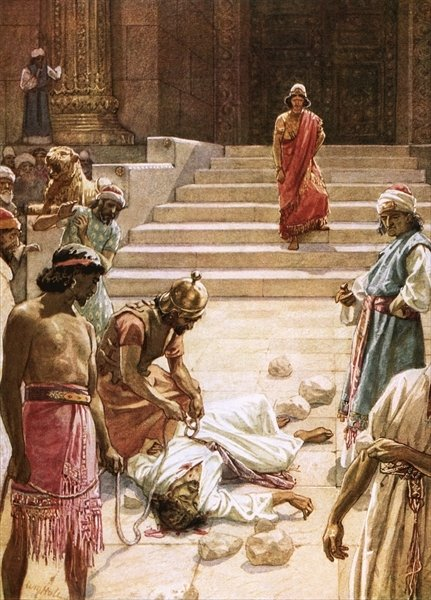
- The Murder of Zechariah by William Brassey Hole
- Venerated in: Judaism; Christianity; Islam; Baháʼí Faith

Zechariah ben Jehoiada (Note: /zɛkəˈraɪ.ə/ (Hebrew: זְכַרְיָה בֶּן־יְהוֹיָדָע Zəḵaryā ben-Yǝhōyāḏāʿ; Arabic: زكريّا بن يهوياداع Zakariya bin Yehuyada)) is a figure in the Hebrew Bible described as a priest who was stoned to death by Jehoash of Judah, and may possibly have been alluded to in the New Testament.

== Lineage ==
Zechariah was the son of Jehoiada, the High Priest in the times of Ahaziah and Jehoash of Judah. After the death of Jehoiada, Zechariah condemned both King Jehoash and the people for their rebellion against God (2 Chronicles 24:20). This so stirred up their resentment against him that at the king's commandment they stoned him, and he died "in the court of the house of the Lord" (24:21).

== In rabbinical literature ==
In rabbinical literature, Zechariah was the son-in-law of the king, Joash. Being a priest, prophet, and judge, he censured the King. At the monarch's command, Zechariah was stoned in the priests' courtyard of the Temple on a Sabbath which was likewise the Day of Atonement. (Rabbi Yudan said: Israel committed seven sins on that same day: they killed a priest, a prophet, a judge, they shed innocent blood, they defiled the court and it was a day of Yom Kippur and a Sabbath.)

Over 200 years later, when Nebuzar-adan, the captain of Nebuchadnezzar's body-guard, came to destroy the Temple, he saw Zechariah's blood which had been boiling since his murder. The Assyrian asked the Jews what that phenomenon meant, but when they replied that it was the blood of sacrifices, he proved the falsity of their answer. The Jews then told him the truth, and Nebuzar-adan, wishing to appease Zechariah's blood, slew in succession the Great and Small Sanhedrins, the young priests, and school-children, till the number of the dead was 940,000. Still the blood continued to boil, whereupon Nebuzar-adan cried: "Zechariah, Zechariah! for thee have I slain the best of them; wouldst thou that I destroy them all?" And at these words the blood ceased to effervesce. The reason the blood kept seething was because of the sin of him being killed; Yom Achpi Hikhbadti is a lament composed by Rabbi Yehuda Halevi and describes the story of Nebuzaradan's arrival at the Temple and his seeing the blood of Zechariah ben Jehoiada. The lament is recited in lamentations on the morning of the ninth of Av in Ashkenazi and Sephardic customs.

== In apocryphal literature ==
According to the ancient apocryphal Lives of the Prophets, after the death of Zechariah Ben Jehoiada, the priests of the Temple could no more, as before, see the apparitions of the angels of the Lord, nor could make divinations with the Ephod, nor give responses from the Debir.

== Possible allusion by Jesus ==
Most modern Christian commentators identify this Zechariah with the one whose murder Jesus alluded to in Matthew 23:35 and Luke 11:50–51. In Matthew 23:28–23:39, Jesus derides the Pharisees and then says, "Therefore I send you prophets and wise men and scribes, some of whom you will kill and crucify, and some you will scourge in your synagogues and persecute from town to town, that upon you may come all the righteous blood shed on earth, from the blood of innocent Abel to the blood of Zacharias the son of Barachias (Ζαχαρίου υἱοῦ Βαραχίου), whom you murdered between the sanctuary and the altar" Matthew 23:35).

Zechariah is then understood as representing the last of the martyrs recorded in the Masoretic Text (since the Hebrew sequence of books ends with 2 Chronicles). Dale C. Allison notes that Luke 11:49–51 echoes 2 Chron 24:17–25 by referring to the sending of the prophets, the blood of Zechariah and the temple precinct.

The Gospel of Matthew records his name as "Zacharias/Zechariah son of Barachias/Berechiah". This identification can be reconciled if Jehoiada was Zechariah's grandfather, and Berechiah his father. However, the prophet Zechariah is listed as the son of Berechiah (Zech. 1:1) and some therefore make this identification. The Book of Zechariah is commonly dated to c. 520–518 BC, several hundred years after the reign of Jehoash of Judah, and in this interpretation Zechariah is chronologically the last of the martyrs.

Other identifications of the person Jesus was referring to include the tradition of the Eastern Orthodox Church, which considers "Zechariah son of Berechiah" as Zechariah, the father of John the Baptist, and his slaying is understood as taking place during the slaughter of the Innocents by Herod.

The Gospel of the Nazarenes, which is said to have been related to the Gospel of Matthew, and is considered the true Gospel of Matthew to the Nazarene Christians, says "son of Jehoiada" instead of "son of Berechiah".

The Methodist theologian Adam Clarke suggests that this allusion by Jesus was actually a prophetic reference to Zacharias Baruch, who was indeed slaughtered 'in the middle of the Temple' in the late AD 60s. Clarke says of this: "Some think that Jesus refers ... to the murder of Zacharias son of Baruch ... They gave him a mock trial, and when no evidence could be brought against him ... two of the stoutest of the zealots fell upon him and slew him in the middle of the temple." Clarke has taken this possible allusion from Josephus Flavius' Jewish War book 4 ch. 5.

Another theory regarding this discrepancy suggests that Matthew intentionally conflated Zechariah ben Jehoiada with Zechariah son of Berechiah, as conflating different figures with similar names or virtues was a common Jewish practice. Matthew seems to take part in this practice in other places such as Matthew 27:9-10 (where he conflates Jeremiah and Zechariah), Matthew 1:7-10(where he conflates Asa with Asaph, and Amon with Amos).

== Monument ==
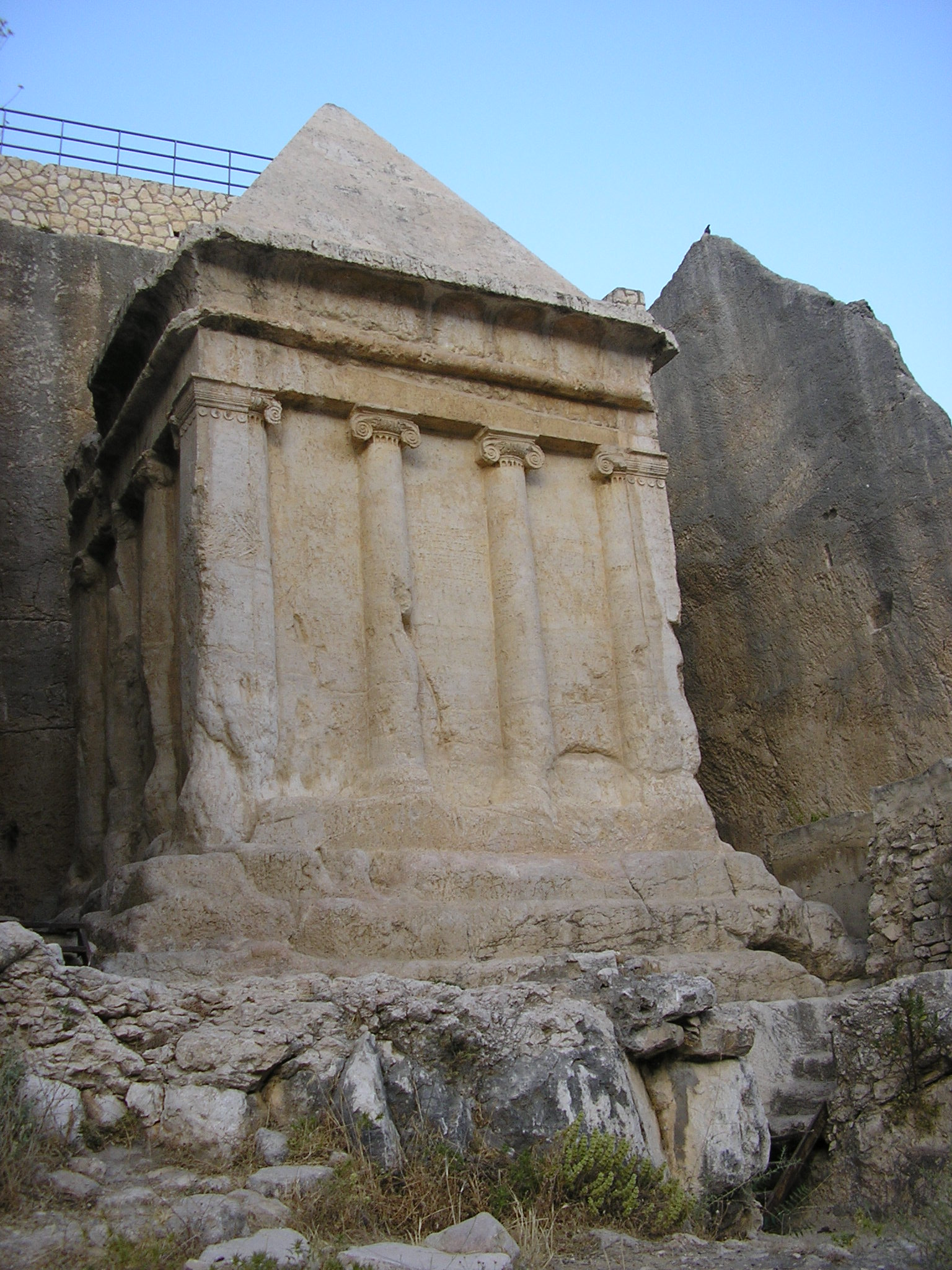
Tomb of Zechariah

According to Jewish tradition, an ancient monument in the Kidron Valley outside the Old City of Jerusalem is identified as the tomb of Zechariah. Sozomen alludes to the burial site of Zechariah ben Jehoiada, whose execution was ordered by King Joash, as being in one of the villages that now bears his name, possibly Khirbet Beit Zakariyyah.
