= Joad =

Joad is (commonly) a family name and may refer to:

- C. E. M. Joad (1891–1953), British philosopher
- Tom Joad, fictional character from the 1939 John Steinbeck novel The Grapes of Wrath and the 1940 movie of the same name

It has been used as a Given name, and may refer to:

- Joad Raymond Wren, writer and historian

== See also ==
- Jehoiada, biblical figure
