= Athaliah =

Athaliah עֲתַלְיָה
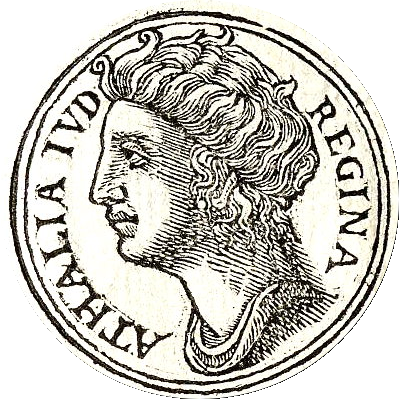
- Athaliah from Guillaume Rouillé's Promptuarii Iconum Insigniorum, 1553

Queen regnant of Judah
- Reign: c. 841 – 835 BC
- Predecessor: Ahaziah
- Successor: Joash

Queen mother of Judah
- Tenure: c. 842 – 841 BC

Queen consort of Judah
- Tenure: c. ? – 842 BC
- Born: Samaria, Kingdom of Israel
- Died: c. 836 BC; Jerusalem, Kingdom of Judah
- Spouse: Jehoram
- Issue: Ahaziah
- House: House of Omri
- Father: Omri or Ahab
- Mother: Jezebel?

Athaliah (Hebrew: עֲתַלְיָה, Modern: ʻAtalya, Tiberian: ʿĂṯalyā, Greek: Γοθολία Gotholía; Latin: Athalia) was the daughter of King Ahab and Queen Jezebel of Israel; she was queen consort of Judah as the wife of King Jehoram, a descendant of King David, and was later queen regnant c. 841–835 BC.

== Biblical narrative ==
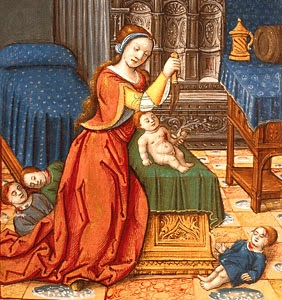
Athaliah murders all infant claimants to the throne (Antoine Dufour, 1505)

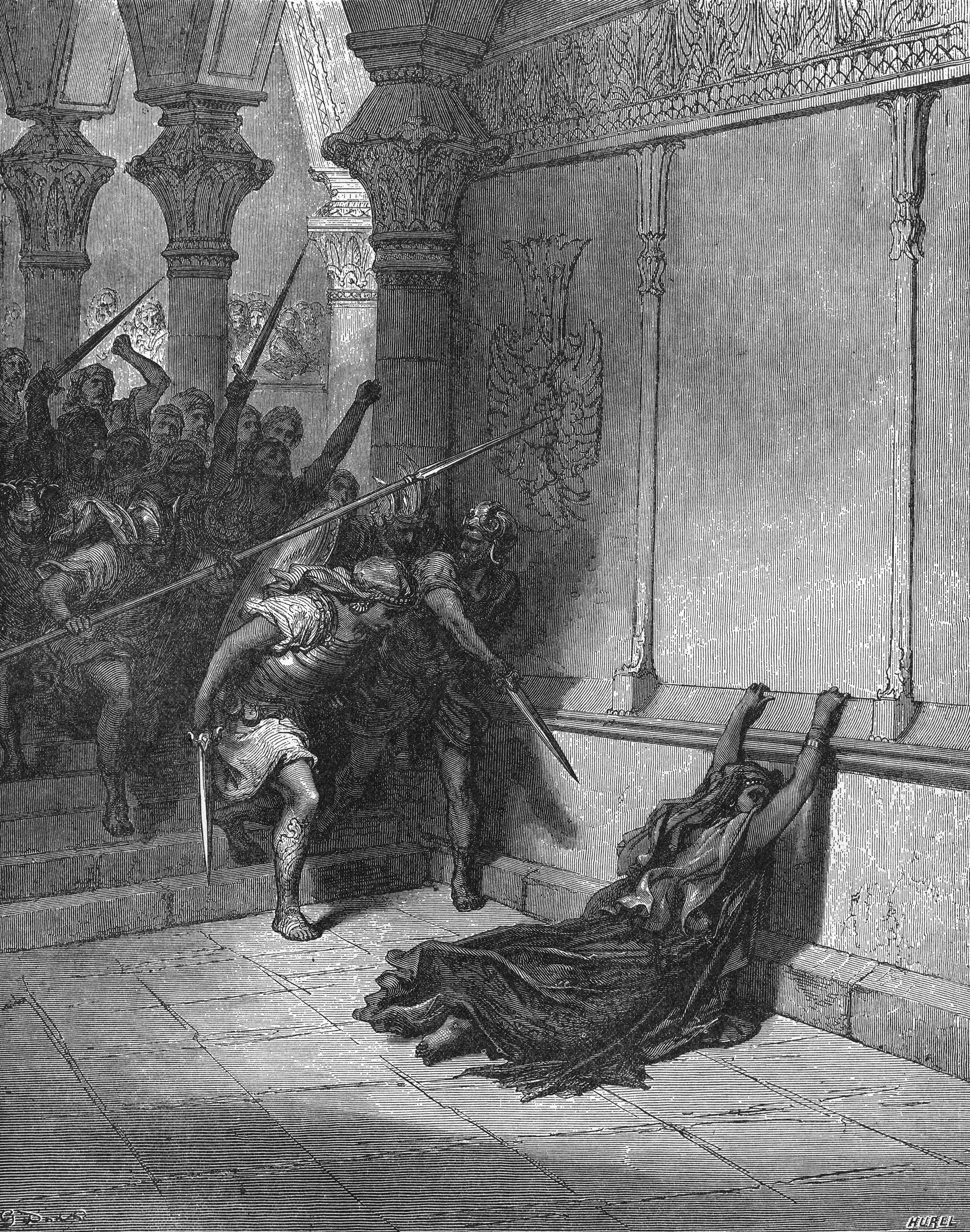
Gustave Doré, The Death of Athaliah.

Accounts of Athaliah’s life are found in 2 Kings 8:16–11:16 and 2 Chronicles 22:10–23:15 in the Hebrew Bible. According to the Deuteronomist, she was the daughter of king Omri of Israel; however, she is usually considered to have been the daughter of King Ahab – the son of Omri – and his wife, Queen Jezebel. Some scholars believe Athaliah was the daughter of Omri, but that she grew up as an orphan in the court of Ahab.

Athaliah was married to Jehoram of Judah to seal a treaty between the kingdoms of Israel and Judah, and to secure his position Jehoram killed his six brothers. Jehoram became king of Judah in the fifth year of Jehoram of Israel's reign (2 Kings 8:16). Jehoram of Israel was either Athaliah's brother or her nephew, depending on her paternity.

Jehoram of Judah reigned for eight years. His father Jehoshaphat and grandfather Asa had been devout kings who worshiped Yahweh, the one true God, and "walked in His ways". However, Jehoram chose not to follow their example and rejected Yahweh, and his rule over Judah was subsequently cursed. Edom revolted, and he was forced to acknowledge their independence. A raid by Philistines, Arabs and Ethiopians looted the king's house, and carried off all of his family except for Jehoram and Athalia's youngest son, Ahaziah.

After Jehoram's death, Ahaziah became king of Judah, and Athaliah became gebirah (queen mother). One year after taking the throne (2 Kings 8:26), Ahaziah and Jehoram of Israel were killed by Jehu, a general in Jehoram's army acting on Yahweh's secret command to take vengeance against the impious kings. Afterwards, Jehu killed Jezebel and the rest of Athaliah’s extended family. Ahab already died in battle before Jehu’s massacre.

Upon hearing of Ahaziah’s death, Athaliah seized the throne of Judah and killed all possible claimants to the throne, which included Ahaziah's sons and his relatives and, possibly, Jehoram's children from his other wife. Some believe that the killings were to prevent David's descendants from outliving Athaliah's kin, most of whom were already killed by Jehu. Others believe they were divine judgment against Jehoshaphat's decision to marry his son to Athaliah.

However, Jehosheba, Ahaziah's sister, managed to rescue an infant from the purge: Jehoash of Judah, the son of Ahaziah and his wife Zibiah. Jehoash was raised in secret by Jehosheba's husband, the priest Jehoiada.

As "usurper queen", Athaliah used her power to establish the Baalist cult in Judah. Six years later, Athaliah was astonished when Jehoiada crowned Jehoash king in Solomon's Temple. She rushed to stop the rebellion but, under Jehoiada’s orders, was killed by the captains outside the Temple since her blood "would defile it".

== Dating of reigns ==
William F. Albright has dated her reign to 842–837 BC, while Edwin R. Thiele in the third edition of his magnum opus dates her reign from 842/841 to 836/835 BC. However, a starting date of 842/841 for Athaliah is one year before the date of 841/840 that Thiele gave for the death of her son, Ahaziah, a conflict which Thiele never resolved.

== In literature ==
Athaliah is discussed in Giovanni Boccaccio's De Mulieribus Claris ("On Famous Women"), as well as The Book of the City of Ladies, by Christine de Pizan.

In 1691, French tragedian Jean Racine wrote a play about this biblical queen, entitled Athalie. The German composer Felix Mendelssohn, among others, wrote incidental music (his op. 74) to Racine's play, first performed in Berlin in 1845. One of the most frequently heard excerpts from the Mendelssohn music is titled "War March of the Priests" ("Kriegsmarsch der Priester").

In 1733, the musician and composer Handel composed an oratorio based on her life, called Athalia, calling her a "Baalite Queen of Judah Daughter of Jezebel". Baal was the fertility god of the Canaanites, whom the ancient Israelites often fell into worshipping in the Tanakh/Old Testament. She is also the basis of Hugo Weisgall and Richard Franko Goldman's opera Athaliah (1964).

Athaliah House of Omri
Regnal titles
Preceded by Ahaziah	Queen of Judah; 842–836 BC	Succeeded by Jehoash
