= Kings of Judah =

The genealogy of the kings of Judah, along with the kings of Israel.

The Kings of Judah were the monarchs who ruled over the ancient Kingdom of Judah, which was formed in about 930 BC, according to the Hebrew Bible, when the United Kingdom of Israel split, with the people of the northern Kingdom of Israel rejecting Rehoboam as their monarch, leaving him as solely the King of Judah.

The capital of the Kingdom of Judah was Jerusalem. All of the kings of Judah lived and died in Judah except for Ahaziah (who died at Megiddo in Israel), Jehoahaz (who died a prisoner in Egypt) and Jeconiah and Zedekiah who were deported as part of the Babylonian captivity.

Judah was conquered in 587 or 586 BC, by the Neo-Babylonian Empire under Nebuzaradan, captain of Nebuchadnezzar's body-guard. With the death or deportation of most of the population and the destruction of Jerusalem and the Temple, the Kingdom of Judah was dissolved.

== List ==
Most modern historians follow either the older chronologies established by William F. Albright or Edwin R. Thiele, or the newer chronologies of Gershon Galil and Kenneth Kitchen, all of which are shown below. All dates are BCE.

Common/Biblical name	Albright	Thiele	Galil	Kitchen	Regnal Name and style	Notes
=== House of David ===
Rehoboam; Reigned for 17 years.	922–915	931–913	931–914	931–915	רחבעם בן-שלמה מלך יהודה; Rehav’am ben Shelomo, Melekh Yehuda	Death: natural causes
Abijah; Reigned for 3 years.	915–913	913–911	914–911	915–912	אבים בן-רחבעם מלך יהודה ’Aviyam ben Rehav’am, Melekh Yehuda	Death: natural causes
Asa; Reigned for 41 years.	913–873	911–870	911–870	912–871	אסא בן-אבים מלך יהודה ’Asa ben ’Aviyam, Melekh Yehuda	Death: severe foot disease
Jehoshaphat; Reigned for 25 years.	873–849	870–848	870–845	871–849	יהושפט בן-אסא מלך יהודה; Yehoshafat ben ’Asa, Melekh Yehuda	Death: natural causes
Jehoram; Reigned for 8 years.	849–842	848–841	851–843	849–842	יהורם בן-יהושפט מלך יהודה; Yehoram ben Yehoshafat, Melekh Yehuda	Death: severe stomach disease
Ahaziah; Reigned for 1 year.	842–842	841–841	843–842	842–841	אחזיהו בן-יהורם מלך יהודה ’Ahazyahu ben Yehoram, Melekh Yehuda	Death: killed by Jehu, who usurped the throne of Israel
Athaliah (Queen); Reigned for 6 years.	842–837	841–835	842–835	841–835	עתליה בת-עמרי מלכת יהודה ‘Atalya bat ‘Omri, Malkat Yehuda	Death: killed by the troops assigned by Jehoiada the Priest to protect Joash. Queen Mother, widow of Jehoram and mother of Ahaziah
Jehoash (Joash); Reigned for 40 years.	837–800	835–796	835–802	835–796	יהואש בן-אחזיהו מלך יהודה; Yehoash ben ’Ahazyahu, Melekh Yehuda	Death: killed by his officials namely: Zabad, son of Shimeath, an Ammonite woman, and Jehozabad, son of Shimrith, a Moabite woman.
Amaziah; Reigned for 29 years.	800–783	796–767	805–776	796–776	אמציהו בן-יהואש מלך יהודה ’Amatzyahu ben Yehoash, Melekh Yehuda	Death: killed in Lachish by the men sent by his officials who conspired against him.
Uzziah (Azariah); Reigned for 52 years.	783–742	767–740	788–736	776–736	עזיהו בן-אמציה מלך יהודה ‘Uziyahu ben ’Amatzyahu, Melekh Yehuda עזריה בן-אמציהו מלך יהודה ‘Azarya ben ’Amatzyahu, Melekh Yehuda	Death: Tzaraath; George Syncellus wrote that the First Olympiad took place in Uzziah's 48th regnal year.
Jotham; Reigned for 16 years.	742–735	740–732	758–742	750–735/30	יותם בן-עזיהו מלך יהודה; Yotam ben ‘Uziyahu, Melekh Yehuda	Death: natural causes
Ahaz; Reigned for 16 years.	735–715	732–716	742–726	735/31–715	אחז בן-יותם מלך יהודה ’Ahaz ben Yotam, Melekh Yehuda	Death: natural causes The Assyrian king Tiglath-Pileser III records he received tribute from Ahaz; compare 2 Kings 16:7-9
Hezekiah; Reigned for 29 years.	715–687	716–687	726–697	715–687	חזקיהו בן-אחז מלך יהודה; Hizqiyahu ben ’Ahaz, Melekh Yehuda	Death: Natural Causes; Contemporary with Sennacherib of Assyria and Merodach-Baladan of Babylon.
Manasseh; Reigned for 55 years.	687–642	687–643	697–642	687–642	מנשה בן-חזקיהו מלך יהודה; Menashe ben Hizqiyahu, Melekh Yehuda	Death: natural causes Mentioned in Assyrian records as a contemporary of Esarhaddon
Amon; Reigned for 2 years.	642–640	643–641	642–640	642–640	אמון בן-מנשה מלך יהודה ’Amon ben Menashe, Melekh Yehuda	Death: killed by his officials, who were killed later on by the people of Judah.
Josiah; Reigned for 31 years.	640–609	641–609	640–609	640–609	יאשיהו בן-אמון מלך יהודה; Yo’shiyahu ben ’Amon, Melekh Yehuda	Death: shot by archers during the battle against Neco of Egypt. He died upon his arrival on Jerusalem.
Jehoahaz; Reigned for 3 months.	609	609	609	609	יהואחז בן-יאשיהו מלך יהודה; Yeho’ahaz ben Yo’shiyahu, Melekh Yehuda	Death: Necho II, king of Egypt, dethroned him, and Jehoahaz was replaced by his brother, Eliakim. Carried off to Egypt, where he died.
Jehoiakim; Reigned for 11 years.	609–598	609–598	609–598	609–598	יהויקים בן-יאשיהו מלך יהודה; Yehoyaqim ben Yo’shiyahu, Melekh Yehuda	Death: Natural Causes; The Battle of Carchemish occurred in the fourth year of his reign (Jeremiah 46:2)
Jehoiachin (Jeconiah); Reigned for 3 months & 10 days.	598	598	598–597	598–597	יהויכין בן-יהויקים מלך יהודה; Yehoyakhin ben Yehoyaqim, Melekh Yehuda יכניה בן-יהויקים מלך יהודה; Yekhonya ben Yehoyaqim, Melekh Yehuda	Death: King Nebuchadnezzar II of Babylon sent for him and brought him to Babylon, where he lived and died. Jerusalem was captured by the Babylonians and Jehoiachin deposed on 16 March, 597 BCE. Called Jeconiah in Jeremiah and Esther
Zedekiah; Reigned for 11 years.	597–587	597–586	597–586	597–586	צדקיהו בן-יאשיהו מלך יהודה; Tzidqiyahu ben Yo’shiyahu, Melekh Yehuda	Death: In prison. His reign saw the second rebellion against Nebuchadnezzar (588–586 BC). Jerusalem was captured after a lengthy siege, the temple burnt, Zedekiah blinded and taken into exile, and Judah reduced to a province.

A footnote in the Amplified Bible regarding Jeremiah 36:3 disputes that King Jehoiakim died of natural causes, asserting that the king rebelled against Babylon several years after these events (II Kings 24:1) and was attacked by numerous bands from various nations subject to Babylon (II Kings 24:2), concluding that he came to a violent death and a disgraceful burial as foretold by Jeremiah (Jer. 22:13–19).

== Chronology ==
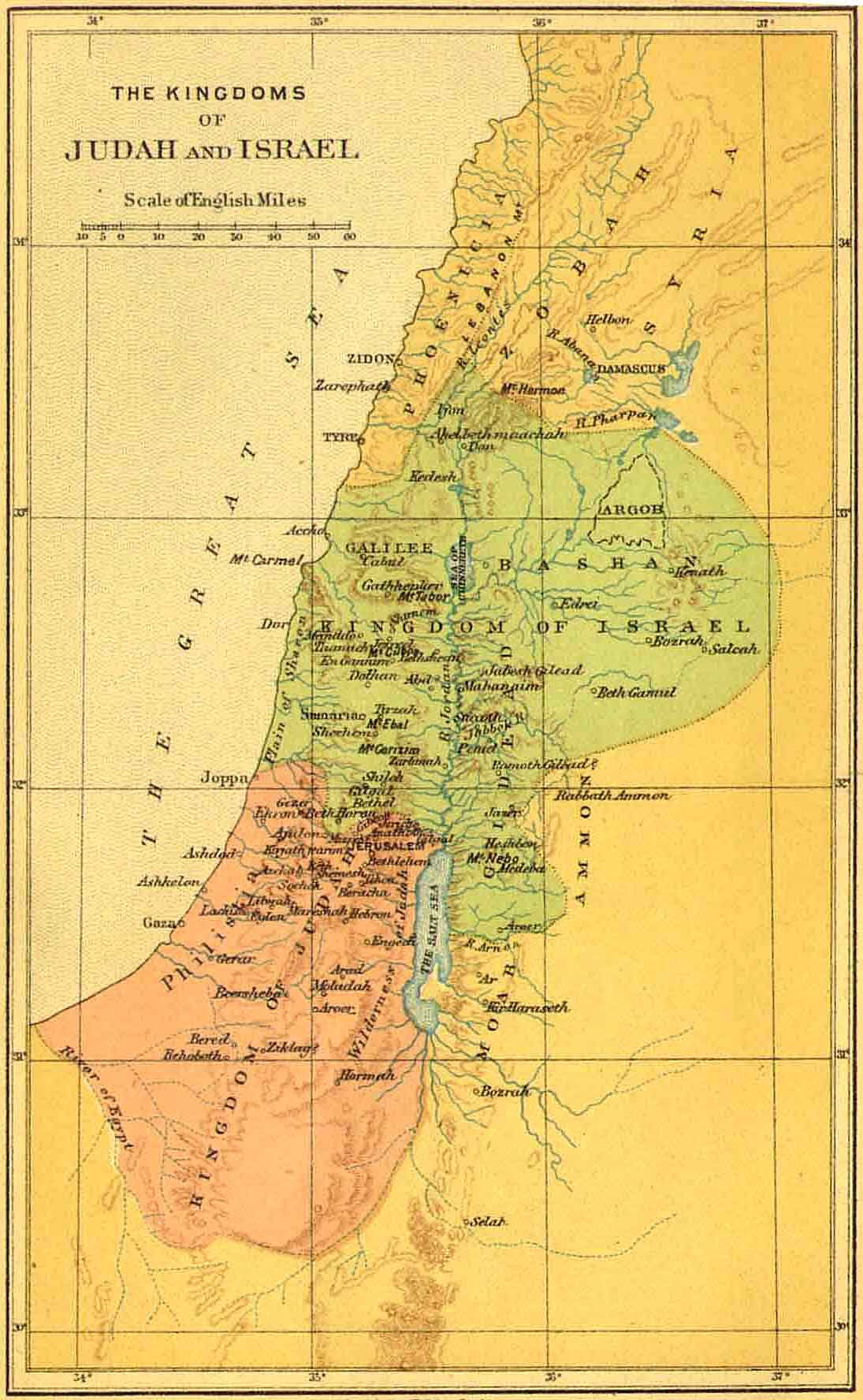
The breakup of the united Kingdom of Solomon

There has been considerable academic debate about the actual dates of reigns of the Judahite kings. Scholars have endeavored to synchronize the chronology of events referred to in the Bible with those derived from other external sources. These scholarly disagreements are reflected in the table above, which contains scholarly attempts to date the reigns of Judahite monarchs in terms of the Gregorian calendar.

Biblical scholars have noted the apparent inconsistencies in the chronology of the kings of Judah and Israel based on the biblical sources. Some have also pointed out the difficulties of cross-synchronising that dating with those of the other cultures of the area. Some have attempted to give as much historical weight as possible to the biblical sources, while others discount their reliability as historic sources, some even denying any historical value to the biblical sources at all.

Using the information in Kings and Chronicles, Edwin Thiele calculated the dates of the reigns of the kings of Judah from the division of the kingdom, which he calculates to have been in 931–930 BCE. Thiele noticed that for the first seven kings of Israel (ignoring Zimri's seven-day reign), the synchronisms to Judean kings fell progressively behind by one year for each king. Thiele saw this as evidence that the northern kingdom was measuring the years by a non-accession system (first partial year of reign was counted as year one), whereas the southern kingdom was using the accession method (it was counted as year zero). He also concluded that the calendars for reckoning the years of kings in Judah and Israel were offset by six months, that of Judah starting in Tishri (in the fall) and that of Israel in Nisan (in the spring). This is the conclusion from cross-synchronizations between the two kingdoms which often allows the narrowing of the beginning or ending dates of a king within a six-month period, identifying the difference as due to the calendar starting date. Once these were understood, the various reign lengths and cross-synchronisms for these kings was determined, and the sum of reigns for both kingdoms produced 931/930 BCE for the division of the kingdom when working backwards from the Battle of Qarqar in 853 BC.

Thiele showed that for the reign of Jehoram, Judah adopted Israel's non-accession method of counting the years of reign, meaning that the first partial year of the king's reign was counted as his first full year, in contrast to the "accession" method previously in use, whereby the first partial year was counted as year "zero", and "year one" was assigned to the first full year of reign. Thiele attributed this change to the rapprochement between Judah and Israel, whereby Jehoshaphat, Jehoram's father, united with Ahab at the battle of Ramoth-Gilead, and chose a daughter for his son from the house of Ahab (1 Kings 22:1–38, 2 Kings 8:18). This convention was followed in Judah for the next three monarchs: Ahaziah, Athaliah, and Jehoash, returning to Judah's original accession reckoning in the time of Amaziah. These changes can be inferred by comparison of the textual data in the Bible; however, the biblical texts do not explicitly state whether the reckoning was by accession or non-accession counting, nor do they indicate explicitly when a change was made in the method. Thiele's reckoning has been criticized as arbitrary in its assignment of accession and non-accession dating systems. The official records of Tiglath-Pileser III show that he switched (arbitrarily) to non-accession reckoning for his reign, in contrast with the accession method used for previous kings of Assyria. Tiglath-Pileser left no record for modern historians to indicate which dating method he used, nor whether he was switching from the method used by his predecessors; this is instead determined by comparison of the relevant texts by Assyriologists, the same as Thiele did for the regnal data of Judah and Israel.

=== Co-regency ===
Additional potential confusion arises from periods of co-regency when a son's reign may begin prior to the end of his father's reign. In those situations, years of reign are specified in terms of both the father and of the son. At times, the period of co-regency is clearly indicated, while in others it must be inferred from the source material.

As an example of the reasoning that finds inconsistencies in calculations when coregencies are a priori ruled out, 2 Kings 18:10 dates the fall of Samaria (the Northern Kingdom) to the 6th year of Hezekiah's reign. William F. Albright dated the fall of the Kingdom of Israel to 721 BC, whereas E. R. Thiele calculated the date as 723 BC. If Albright's or Thiele's dating are correct, then Hezekiah's reign would begin in either 729 or 727 BCE. On the other hand, 18:13 states that Sennacherib invaded Judah in the 14th year of Hezekiah's reign. Assyrian records date this invasion to 701 BC, and Hezekiah's reign would therefore begin in 716/715 BC. This dating would be confirmed by the account of Hezekiah's illness in chapter 20, which immediately follows Sennacherib's departure (2 Kings 20). This would date his illness to Hezekiah's 14th year, which is confirmed by Isaiah's statement (2 Kings 18:5) that he would live fifteen more years (29−15=14). These problems are all addressed by scholars who make reference to the ancient Near Eastern practice of coregency.

Following the approach of Wellhausen, another set of calculations shows it is probable that Hezekiah did not ascend the throne before 722 BCE. By Albright's calculations, Jehu's initial year was 842 BC; and between it and Samaria's destruction the Books of Kings give the total number of the years the kings of Israel ruled as 143 7/12, while for the kings of Judah the number is 165. This discrepancy, amounting in the case of Judah to 45 years (165−120), has been accounted for in various ways; each of those positions must allow for Hezekiah's first six years to have fallen before 722 BCE. (However, Hezekiah beginning to reign before 722 BCE is consistent with a co-regency of Ahaz and Hezekiah from 729 BC.) Nor is it clearly known how old Hezekiah was when called to the throne; although 2 Kings 18:2 states that he was twenty-five years of age, his father died at the age of thirty-six (2 Kings 16:2) and it is not likely that Ahaz had a son at the age of eleven. Hezekiah's son Manasseh ascended the throne twenty-nine years later, at the age of twelve. This places his birth in the seventeenth year of his father's reign, suggesting Hezekiah's age as forty-two, if he was twenty-five at his ascension. It is more probable that Ahaz was twenty-one or twenty-five when Hezekiah was born (suggesting an error in the text), and that the latter was thirty-two at the birth of his son and successor, Manasseh.

Since Albright and Friedman, several scholars have explained these dating problems on the basis of a co-regency between Hezekiah and his father Ahaz between 729 and 716/715 BCE. Assyriologists and Egyptologists recognize that co-regency was practiced in both Assyria and Egypt. After noting that co-regencies were used sporadically in the northern kingdom (Israel), Nadav Na'aman writes,

In the kingdom of Judah, on the other hand, the nomination of a co-regent was the common procedure, beginning from David who, before his death, elevated his son Solomon to the throne.... When taking into account the permanent nature of the co-regency in Judah from the time of Joash, one may dare to conclude that dating the co-regencies accurately is indeed the key for solving the problems of biblical chronology in the eighth century B.C."

Among the numerous scholars who have recognized the co-regency between Ahaz and Hezekiah are Kenneth Kitchen, Leslie McFall and Jack Finegan. McFall, in his 1991 article, argues that if 729 BCE (that is, the Judean regnal year beginning in Tishri of 729) is taken as the start of the Ahaz/Hezekiah co-regency, and 716/715 BCE as the date of the death of Ahaz, then all the extensive chronological data for Hezekiah and his contemporaries in the late eighth century BCE are in harmony. Further, McFall found that no textual emendations are required among the numerous dates, reign lengths, and synchronisms given in the Bible for this period. In contrast, those who do not accept the Ancient Near Eastern principle of co-regencies require multiple emendations of the biblical text, and there is no general agreement on which texts should be emended, nor is there any consensus among these scholars on the resultant chronology for the eighth century BCE. This is in contrast with the general consensus among those who accept the biblical and near Eastern practice of co-regencies that Hezekiah was installed as co-regent with his father Ahaz in 729 BC, and the synchronisms of 2 Kings 18 must be measured from that date, whereas the synchronisms with Sennacherib are measured from the sole reign starting in 716/715 BCE. The two synchronisms to Hoshea of Israel in 2 Kings 18 are then in agreement with the dates of Hoshea's reign that can be determined from Assyrian sources, as is the date of Samaria's fall as stated in 2 Kings 18:10. An analogous situation of two ways of measurement, both equally valid, is encountered in the dates given for Jehoram of Israel, whose first year is synchronized to the 18th year of the sole reign of Jehoshaphat of Judah in 2 Kings 3:1 (853/852 BC), but his reign is also reckoned according to another method as starting in the second year of the coregency of Jehoshaphat and his son Jehoram of Judah (2 Kings 1:17); both methods refer to the same calendar year.

Scholars who accept the principle of co-regencies note that abundant evidence for their use is found in the biblical material itself. The agreement of scholarship built on these principles with both biblical and secular texts was such that the Thiele/McFall chronology was accepted as the best chronology for the kingdom period in Jack Finegan's encyclopedic Handbook of Biblical Chronology.

=== Synchronism to fall of Judah ===
The Babylonian Chronicles give 2 Adar (16 March), 597 BC, as the date that Nebuchadnezzar first captured Jerusalem, thus putting an end to the reign of Jehoaichin. Zedekiah's installation as king by Nebuchadnezzar can thus be dated to the early spring of 597 BC.

Historically, there has been considerable controversy over the date when Jerusalem was captured the second time and Zedekiah's reign came to an end. There is no dispute about the month, the summer month of Tammuz (Jeremiah 52:6). However, regarding the year, Albright preferred 587 BCE and Thiele advocated 586 BC, and this division among scholars has persisted until the present time. If Zedekiah's years are by accession counting, whereby the year he came to the throne was considered his "zero" year and his first full regnal year, 597/596, was counted as year one, Zedekiah's eleventh year, the year the city fell, would be 587/586. Since Judean regnal years were measured from Tishri in the fall, this would place the end of his reign and the capture of the city in the summer of 586 BCE. Accession counting was the rule for most, but not all, of the kings of Judah, whereas "non-accession" counting was the rule for most, but not all, of the kings of Israel.

The publication of the Babylonian Chronicles in 1956, however, gave evidence that the years of Zedekiah were measured in a non-accession sense. This reckoning makes 598/597 BC, the year Zedekiah was installed by Nebuchadnezzar according to Judah's Tishri-based calendar, to be year "one", so that the fall of Jerusalem in his eleventh year would have been 588/587 BC, i.e. in the summer of 587 BCE. The Bablyonian Chronicles fairly precisely date the capture of Jehoiachin and the start of Zedekiah's reign, and they also give the accession year of Nebuchadnezzar's successor Amel-Marduk (Evil Merodach) as 562/561 BC, which was the 37th year of Jehoiachin's captivity according to 2 Kings 25:27. These Babylonian records related to Jehoiachin's reign are consistent with the fall of the city in 587 but not in 586, vindicating Albright's reckoning.

=== Synchronism to Gregorian dating ===
Further potential confusion arises from the convention of dating reigns of the Israelite kings in reference to the Gregorian calendar. Years in the Gregorian calendar commence on 1 January, whereas year numbers for dating biblical events start on 1 Tishri of the Hebrew calendar, with an unfixed starting point during September–October on the Gregorian calendar. Accordingly, an event which takes place after 1 Tishri, for example, in November and December on the Gregorian calendar, would fall in the following year in the Hebrew calendar used for biblical dating.

== Coronation ritual ==
A detailed account of a coronation in ancient Judah is found in 2 Kings 11:12 and 2 Chronicles 23:11, in which the seven-year-old Jehoash is crowned in a coup against the usurper Athaliah. This ceremony took place in the doorway of the Temple in Jerusalem. The king was led to "his pillar", where a crown was placed upon his head, and "the testimony" given to him, after which he was anointed at the hands of the high priest and his sons. Afterwards, the people "clapped their hands" and shouted "God save the King" as trumpets blew, music played, and singers offered hymns of praise.

== See also ==
- Chronicles of the Kings of Judah
- Chronology of the Bible
- History of ancient Israel and Judah
- Kingdom of Israel (united monarchy)
- Kingdom of Israel (Samaria)
- Kingdom of Judah
- Kings of Israel and Judah
