= Athalia (Handel) =

Oratorio by Handel

George Frideric Handel

Athalia (HWV 52) is an English-language oratorio composed by George Frideric Handel to a libretto by Samuel Humphreys based on the play Athalie by Jean Racine. The work was commissioned in 1733 for the Publick Act in Oxford – a commencement ceremony of the University of Oxford, which had offered Handel an honorary doctorate (an honour he declined). The story is based on that of the Biblical queen Athaliah. Athalia, Handel's third oratorio in English, was completed on 7 June 1733, and first performed on 10 July 1733 at the Sheldonian Theatre in Oxford. The Bee (14 July 1733) reported that the performance was "performed with the utmost Applause, and is esteemed equal to the most celebrated of that Gentleman's Performances: there were 3700 Persons present".

Athalia was first given in London on 1 April 1735 at Covent Garden Theatre.

== Dramatis personae ==
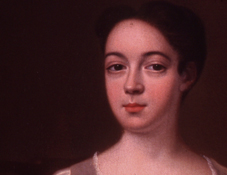
Anna Maria Strada, creator of the role of Josabeth

Roles, voice types, and premiere cast
Role	Voice	1733 Oxford cast	1735 London cast
Athalia, Baalite Queen of Judah and Daughter of Ahab and Jezebel	soprano	Mrs. Wright	Cecilia Young
Josabeth, Wife of Joad	soprano	Anna Maria Strada	Anna Maria Strada
Joas, King of Judah	boy soprano	Master Goodwill	William Savage
Joad, High Priest	alto	Walter Powell	Giovanni Carestini
Mathan, Priest of Baal, formerly a Jewish Priest	tenor	Phillip Rochetti	John Beard
Abner, Captain of the Jewish Forces	bass	Gustavus Waltz	Gustavus Waltz
Chorus of Young Virgins
Chorus of Israelites
Chorus of Priests and Levites
Chorus of Attendants
Chorus of Sidonian Priests

== Synopsis ==
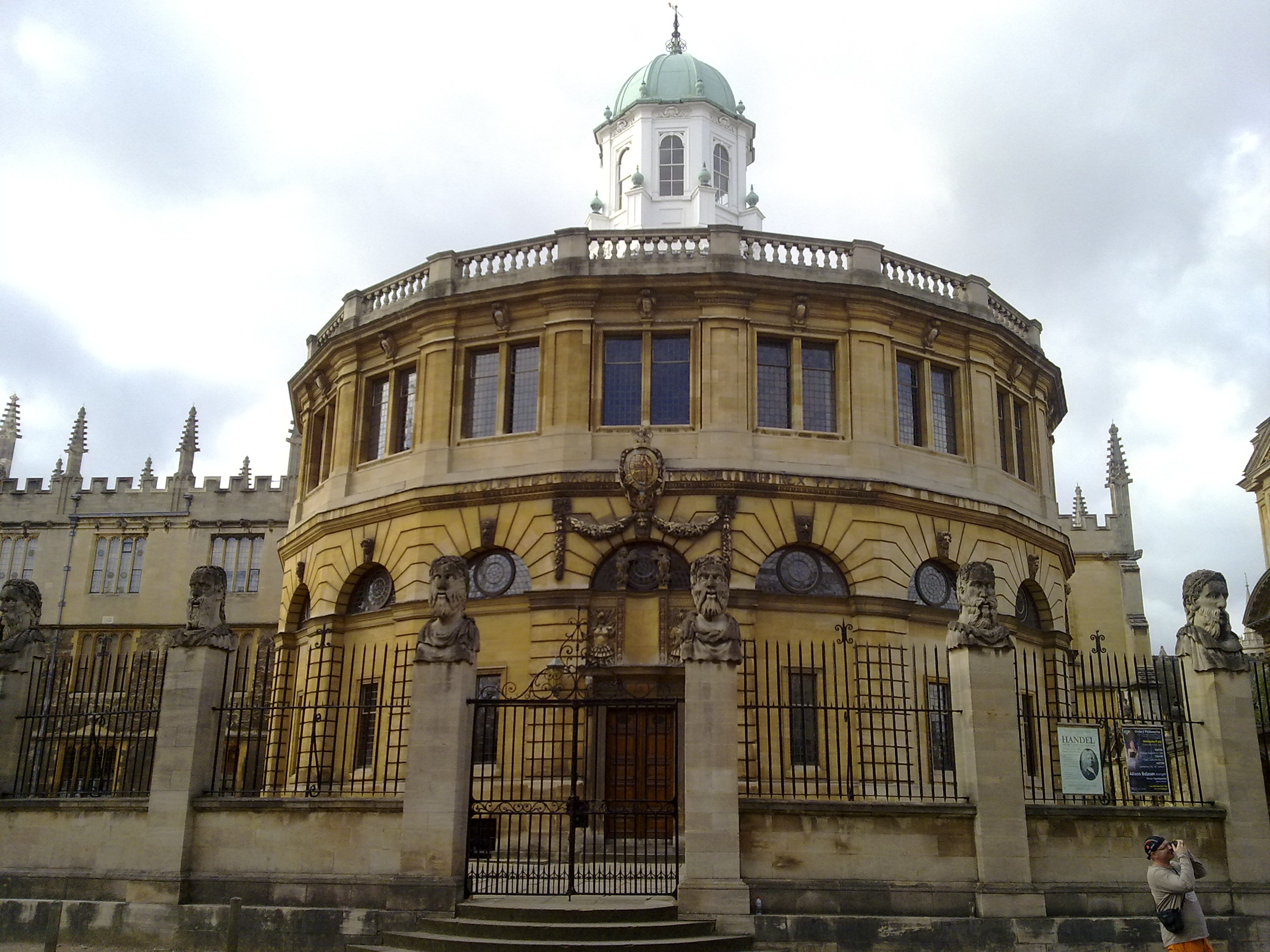
Sheldonian Theatre, Oxford, where Athalia was first performed

Athalia, daughter of King Ahab of Israel and Queen Jezebel, had been married to Jehoram, King of Judah. After her husband's death, Athalia was determined to stamp out the Jewish line of kings descended from David. She caused, so she believed, all the heirs to the throne to be murdered. She took the throne and ruled Judah herself, and began to devote the country to the idolatrous worship of Baal instead of the God of Israel. However, the child Joas, rightful heir to the throne, had been saved from death by Joad the High Priest and his wife Josabeth and raised as their own son under the name "Eliakim".

=== Act 1 ===
In the Temple during a religious festival, the Jewish people offer their prayers to God. The High Priest Joad laments Queen Athalia's blasphemy in seeking to force the worship of Baal. All join in prayers for deliverance from her tyrannous rule. At the Palace, the Queen is disturbed by a dream she has had of a young boy dressed as a Jewish priest plunging a dagger into her heart. The high priest of Baal, Mathan, calms her by saying it was only a dream and suggests she have the Temple searched. Abner, Captain of the Guards, loyal to the God of Israel, go to the Temple to warn of the upcoming search just as Joad the High Priest and his wife Josabeth are preparing to reveal to the nation that the boy "Eliakim" whom they have raised as their own son is in fact Joas, descendant of David and rightful King. Josabeth is alarmed and despondent at the news of the search but her husband tells her to trust in God.

=== Act 2 ===
The Jewish people in the Temple offer magnificent songs of praise to God. Athalia enters and is alarmed to see in "Eliakim" the very image of the child who stabbed her in her dream. She interrogates the boy and when he tells her he is an orphan she offers to adopt him, but he rejects with revulsion the idea of such close association with an idolator such as she. Athalia is enraged and departs, vowing that she will have the child regardless. Once again Josabeth, close to despair, is counseled by Joad to trust God. The chorus comment that the guilty are sure to be punished.

=== Act 3 ===
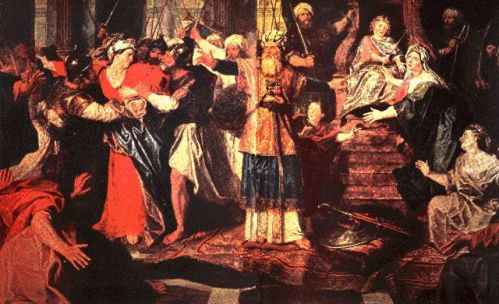
Athaliah Expelled from the Temple by Antoine Coypel

Joad, inspired by God, prophesies the downfall of Athalia. He and Josabeth explain to the boy ""Eliakim" that he is really Joas, rightful King, and crown him, to the acclaim of the people. Athalia enters, demanding that the boy be given to her, and when she learns that he has been crowned, orders the treason to be punished, but her soldiers have all deserted her. Even Mathan, High Priest of Baal, declares that the God of Israel has triumphed. Athalia knows she is doomed, but goes to her death declaring that she will seek vengeance even from the grave. All praise the rightful King and the true God.

== Theme of the libretto ==
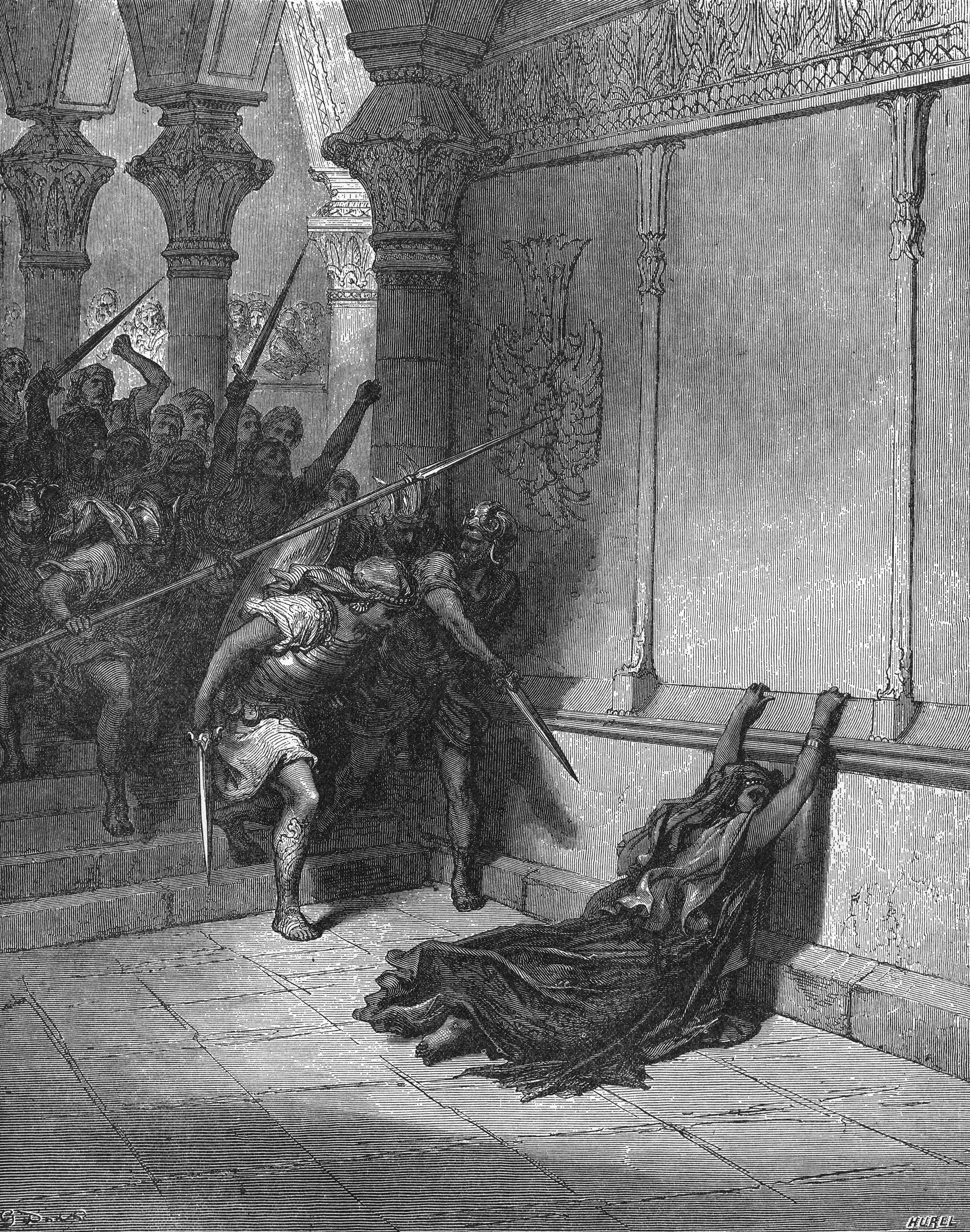
The Death of Athaliah by Gustave Doré

The biblical story of Athalia, with its tale of deposing a usurping and tyrannous monarch, was used by supporters of the Jacobite cause as justification for restoring the Stuart monarchy. Oxford was then a centre of High church and Jacobite sentiment, which has caused the choice of subject for this oratorio by a supporter of the Hanoverian monarchy such as Handel to seem strange to some writers. However the libretto by Samuel Humphreys alters Racine's original by placing great emphasis on removing "idolatry" from the land, clearly referring to removing Catholic influence, and is thus supportive of the Protestant Hanoverian monarchy. The subject of the oratorio was most likely a conscious choice on Handel's part of a subject that would appeal to the Jacobite supporters in Oxford without being disloyal to his Hanoverian patrons.

== Musical features ==
The work is scored for strings, 2 recorders (or flutes), 2 oboes, 2 bassoons, 2 horns, 2 trumpets, timpani and continuo. Athalia shows flexibility and originality in form on Handel's part, combining solos with chorus in new ways. Its vivid characterisation through music contributed to its immense success at its premiere.

== Recordings ==
Athalia discography
Year	Cast:Athalia, Josabeth, Joad, Joas, Mathan, Abner	Conductor, orchestra and chorus	Label
1986	Joan Sutherland, Emma Kirkby, James Bowman, Aled Jones, Anthony Rolfe Johnson, David Thomas	Christopher Hogwood; Academy of Ancient Music and Choir of New College, Oxford	CD:Decca; Cat:475 6731 dc8
1998	Elisabeth Scholl, Barbara Schlick, Annette Reinhold, Friederike Holzhausen, Markus Brutscher, Stephan McLeod	Joachim Carlos Martini; Frankfurt Baroque Orchestra and Junge Kantorei	CD:Naxos; Cat:8.554364-65
2005	Simone Kermes, Olga Pasichnyk, Martin Oro, Trine Wilsberg Lund, Thomas Cooley, Wolf Matthias Friedrich	Peter Neumann; Collegium Cartusianum and Kölner Kammerchor	CD:MDG; Cat:332 1276-2
2010	Geraldine McGreevy, Nuria Rial, Lawrence Zazzo, Aaron Mächler, Charles Daniels, David Wilson-Johnson	Paul Goodwin; Kammerorchester Basel and Vocalconsort Berlin	CD:Deutsche HM; Cat:88697723172

== See also ==
- List of oratorios by George Frideric Handel
