= Zibiah =

Zibiah, or Sibia, (Hebrew: צִבְיָה; Ṣīḇəyā, transl. "gazelle") was the royal consort of King Ahaziah of Judah, and the mother of King Jehoash of Judah. She was from Beersheba. She is mentioned only in 2 Kings 12:1 and 2 Chronicles 24:1, both references to her son's accession.

The biblical references give no information about her other than her association with Beersheba and Joash. Zibiah is also a Hebrew feminine given name (compare Aramaic, "Tabitha").
