= Richard Franko Goldman =

American composer and educator (1910–1980)

Richard Franko Goldman (December 7, 1910 – January 19, 1980) was a conductor, educator, author, music critic, and composer.

Born Richard Henry Maibrunn Goldman (Maibrunn being his mother's family name), he adopted the same middle name as his father, the conductor Edwin Franko Goldman, whose middle name came from the latter's mother's musical family.

After graduating from Townsend Harris High School in Manhattan, New York, Richard Goldman attended Columbia University, graduating in 1930 with an A.B. (with honors). After a year of graduate study at Columbia, he then went to Paris to study composition with Nadia Boulanger. He also studied privately with Wallingford Riegger. During World War II he served in the Office of Strategic Services.

He was associate conductor 1937–1956 and then succeeded his father as conductor of the Goldman Band of New York City. He led that band from 1956 until poor health caused him to stop conducting in the summer of 1979. He dissolved the band, but it returned to perform as the Guggenheim Concerts Band in 1980 and the Goldman Memorial Band in 1984.

He taught at the Juilliard School 1947–1960 and was a visiting professor at Princeton University 1952–1956. He also was director of the Peabody Conservatory of Music in Baltimore, Maryland 1968–1977 and president of the Peabody Institute 1969–1977. He was initiated as a national honorary member of Phi Mu Alpha Sinfonia music fraternity in 1969.

Amongst his compositions are the Lee Rigg (1942) for orchestra, Sonata for Violin and Piano (1964), and a Duo for Tubas or bassoons (1950). He also wrote several marches, including The Foundation, Pride of the 97, National Intercollegiate Band (named for the Kappa Kappa Psi and Tau Beta Sigma–sponsored ensemble), and Seaside Park. His contributions to The Musical Quarterly as New York critic ensured early recognition to Wallingford Riegger, Henry Cowell, and Elliott Carter. He was also the librettist for Hugo Weisgall's opera Athaliah (1964).

== Awards and honors ==
- Juilliard Music Foundation award 1955
- Ditson Conductor's Award 1961
- Guggenheim Fellowship 1962
- Kappa Kappa Psi Distinguished Service to Music Medal, 1971
- National Patron of Delta Omicron, an international professional music fraternity.

== Personal life ==
He married Alexandra Rienzi on June 8, 1934. Together they had one child, Daniel Franko Goldman. Richard Franko Goldman died aged 69 at Mercy Hospital in Baltimore.

== Bibliography ==
- (1977/1965). Harmony in Western Music. New York: W. W. Norton. ISBN 0-214-66680-8 (1965).
