= Jehosheba =

Figure in the Hebrew Bible

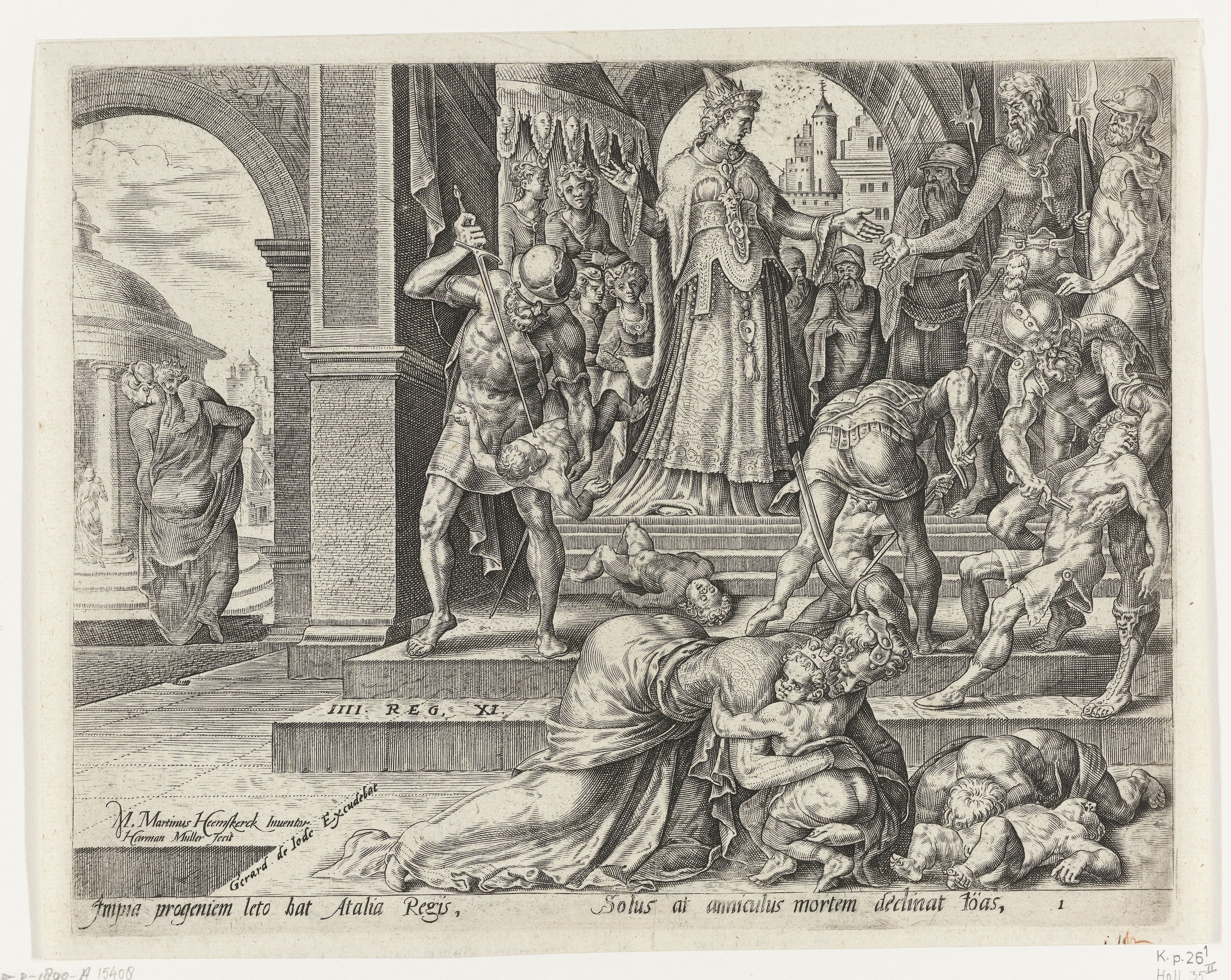
"Joash is rescued by his aunt Jehosheba", print by Harmen Jansz Muller, c. 1565–69; the pair are visible at far left

Jehosheba (alternately Jehoshabeath; Hebrew: יְהוֹשֶׁ֫בַע Yəhōšeḇa‘, "Yahweh is an oath"), or Josaba, is a figure in the Hebrew Bible. She was the daughter of King Jehoram of Judah, sister to King Ahaziah of Judah and wife of Jehoiada the priest. She was a daughter of Jehoram, but not necessarily of Athaliah. After the death of Ahaziah, his mother, Athaliah, made herself Queen of Judah and ordered the execution of all members of the royal family that could claim the throne. However, according to 2 Kings 11:2, Jehosheba saved from the massacre her infant nephew Jehoash, Ahaziah's son and Athaliah's grandson:

But Jehosheba, the daughter of king Joram, sister of Ahaziah, took Joash the son of Ahaziah, and stole him from among the king's sons which were slain; and they hid him, even him and his nurse, in the bedchamber from Athaliah, so that he was not slain.

Jehoash, then one year old, was the only survivor of the massacre. Jehosheba and Jehoiada hid him in the Temple for six years.

In the seventh year, Jehoiada and the other priests devised a plan to reestablish the Davidic line in Judah through the coronation of Jehoash (aged seven). When the plan was implemented, Athaliah overheard the noise of the people chanting "Long live the king". When she entered the Temple she found her crowned grandson seated on a royal pillar surrounded by a crowd of supporters. She tore her clothes and cried "Treason, treason!" Jehoiada ordered that she be slain but not inside the Temple. Athaliah was captured and put to death in the gateway leading from the horse stalls to the royal palace, thus ending the reign of Athaliah and beginning the reign of Jehoash.

According to 2 Kings 11:2, the city was quiet, now that Athaliah had been slain.

The Otzar Midrashim lists Jehosheba as one of the 23 great righteous women of Israel. Alice L. Laffey points out that it was through the action of Jehosheba and the anonymous nurse that the Davidic line was preserved.
