= Jehoiada =

Priest in Judah in the Bible

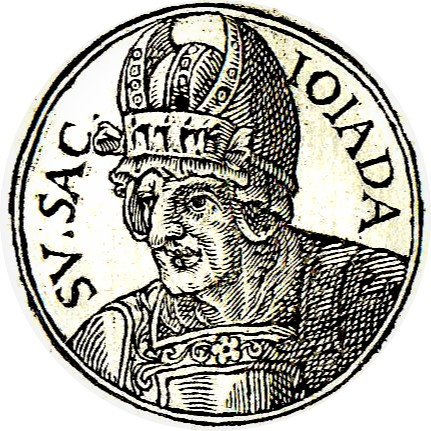
Jehoiada from Promptuarii Iconum Insigniorum

Jehoiada (Hebrew: יְהוֹיָדָע Yəhōyāḏā‘, "Yahweh knows") in the Hebrew Bible, was a prominent priest in the kingdom of Judah during the reigns of Ahaziah (reigned c. 842 - 841 BCE), Athaliah (reigned c. 841–835 BCE), and Joash (reigned c. 836–796 BC). Jehoiada became the brother-in-law of King Ahaziah as a result of his marriage with princess Jehosheba. Both Jehosheba and Ahaziah were children of King Jehoram of Judah (reigned c. 849 – 842 BCE). Ahaziah died a year after assuming the throne, which was then usurped by his mother Athaliah, who ordered the execution of all members of the royal family.

Jehosheba and Jehoiada rescued Athaliah's one-year-old grandson, Joash, from Athaliah's slaughter. For six years, they hid the sole surviving heir to the throne within Solomon's Temple. Jehoiada was instrumental in the staging of a coup d'état which dethroned and killed Athaliah. The account in 2 Chronicles notes the resolve of Jehoiada (Jehoiada strengthened himself in the King James Version, Jehoiada took courage in the English Standard Version, words which do not occur in the parallel passage of 2 Kings 11:4). Athaliah described the coup as an act of treason (2 Chronicles 23:13).

Under Jehoiada's guidance, Baal-worship was renounced and the altar and temple of Baal were destroyed. Jehoiada is also noteworthy for the national covenant that he made "between him, and between all the people, and between the king, that they should be the LORD's people" (2 Chronicles 23:16). According to the book of Chronicles Jehoiada lived for 130 years, which would give him an unlikely age of around 100 years at the time of his coupe against Athalia, and was buried very honorably among the kings in the city of David (2 Chronicles 24:15). Jehoiada's son, Zechariah ben Jehoiada, was later martyred by King Joash.

== Priest or High priest? ==
Jehoiada's name does not appear in the list of the Zadokite dynasty in 1 Chronicles 5:30–40 (6:4-15 in other translations).

Josephus mentions Jehoiada as "high priest in his Jewish Antiquities Book 9, Chapter 7," "How Athaliah reigned over Jerusalem for five [six] years, when Jehoiada the high priest slew her." However, Josephus does not mention a Jehoiada in his list of High Priests (10:151-153).

According to the medieval chronicle Seder Olam Zutta (804 CE), Jehoiada was a High priest.

The Book of Chronicles states in 2 Chronicles 24:6 that Jehoiada was the "chief", with some translations adding in the word "priest" afterwards. This could be implied that he was the High Priest or that he was one of the tribal leader among the 24 orders of priests selected in 1 Chronicles 24.

== Patrilineal ancestry ==
Patrilineal descent
1. Abraham
2. Isaac
3. Jacob
4. Levi
5. Kohath
6. Amram
7. Aaron
8. Eleazar
9. Phinehas
10. Abishua
11. Bukki
12. Uzzi
13. Zerahiah
14. Meraioth
15. Amariah
16. Ahitub
17. Zadok
18. Achim
19. Eliud
20. Benaiah

== See also ==
Bench, Clayton H. The Coup of Jehoiada and the Fall of Athaliah: The Discourses and Textual Production of 2 Kings 11. Piscataway: Gorgias Press, 2016.

Israelite religious titles
Preceded by Jehoshaphat (According to the Seder 'Olam Zutta)	High Priest of Israel	Succeeded by Pediah (According to the Seder 'Olam Zutta)
