= Ahaziah of Judah =

Sixth king of the Kingdom of Judah

Ahaziah
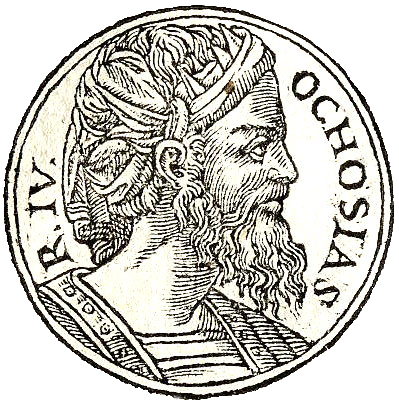
- Ahaziah from Guillaume Rouillé's Promptuarii Iconum Insigniorum, 1553

King of Judah
- Reign: c. 842 – 841 BCE
- Predecessor: Jehoram
- Successor: Athaliah
- Born: c. 863 BCE; Jerusalem, Kingdom of Judah
- Died: c. 841 BCE; Megiddo, Kingdom of Israel
- Burial: c. 841 BCE; City of David
- Spouse: Zibiah
- Issue: Jehoash of Judah
Names
- Ahaziah ben Jehoram
- Hebrew: אֲחַזְיָה
- House: House of David
- Father: Jehoram
- Mother: Athaliah

Ahaziah of Judah (Hebrew: אֲחַזְיָהוּ, romanized: ʼĂḥazyāhū; Greek: Ὀχοζίας Okhozias; Latin: Ahazia) or Jehoahaz I (2 Chronicles 21:17; 25:23), was the sixth king of Judah, and the son of Jehoram and Athaliah, the daughter (or possibly sister) of king Ahab of Israel. He was also the first Judahite king to be descended from both the House of David and the House of Omri, through his mother and successor, Athaliah.

According to 2 Kings 8:26, Ahaziah was 22 years old when he began to reign, and reigned for one year in Jerusalem. 2 Chronicles 22:2 gives his age as 42 years when his reign began in Jerusalem.

William F. Albright has dated his reign to 842 BC, while E. R. Thiele offers the date 841/840 BC. Thiele's chronology for the first kings of Judah contained an internal inconsistency that placed Ahaziah's reign one year after his mother Athaliah usurped the throne. Later scholars corrected this by dating these kings one year earlier, so that Ahaziah's dates are taken as one year earlier than Thiele's.

== Reign ==
Ahaziah was the youngest son of king Jehoram of Judah. According to 2 Chronicles 21:16–17, his older brothers had been carried off in a Philistine and Arab raid.

Under the influence of his mother Athaliah, Ahaziah introduced forms of worship that offended the Yahwistic party.

Members of her family became his advisors and encouraged him to join his uncle Jehoram, king of Israel, in an expedition against Hazael, king of the Arameans. Jehoram was wounded in the battle, and went to recuperate at Jezreel. Ahaziah also left the field of conflict in Gilead, and, after a visit to Jerusalem, came to Jezreel for a conference with Jehoram, and was caught up in the revolt by Jehu. According to the account given in the Second Book of Kings, Ahaziah and Jehoram both went out to meet the rebellious general, with Jehoram learning too late of Jehu's murderous intentions. Ahaziah watched as his uncle was shot by Jehu, who was armed with a bow. Ahaziah fled for his life, but was wounded at the pass of Gur in Ibleam and had strength only to reach Megiddo, where he died (2 Kings 9:22–28). 2 Chronicles, however, gives a different account of Ahaziah's death, which has him hiding in Samaria after Jehu's coup, only to be found and killed by Jehu's henchmen on their king's orders.

== Tel Dan Stele ==
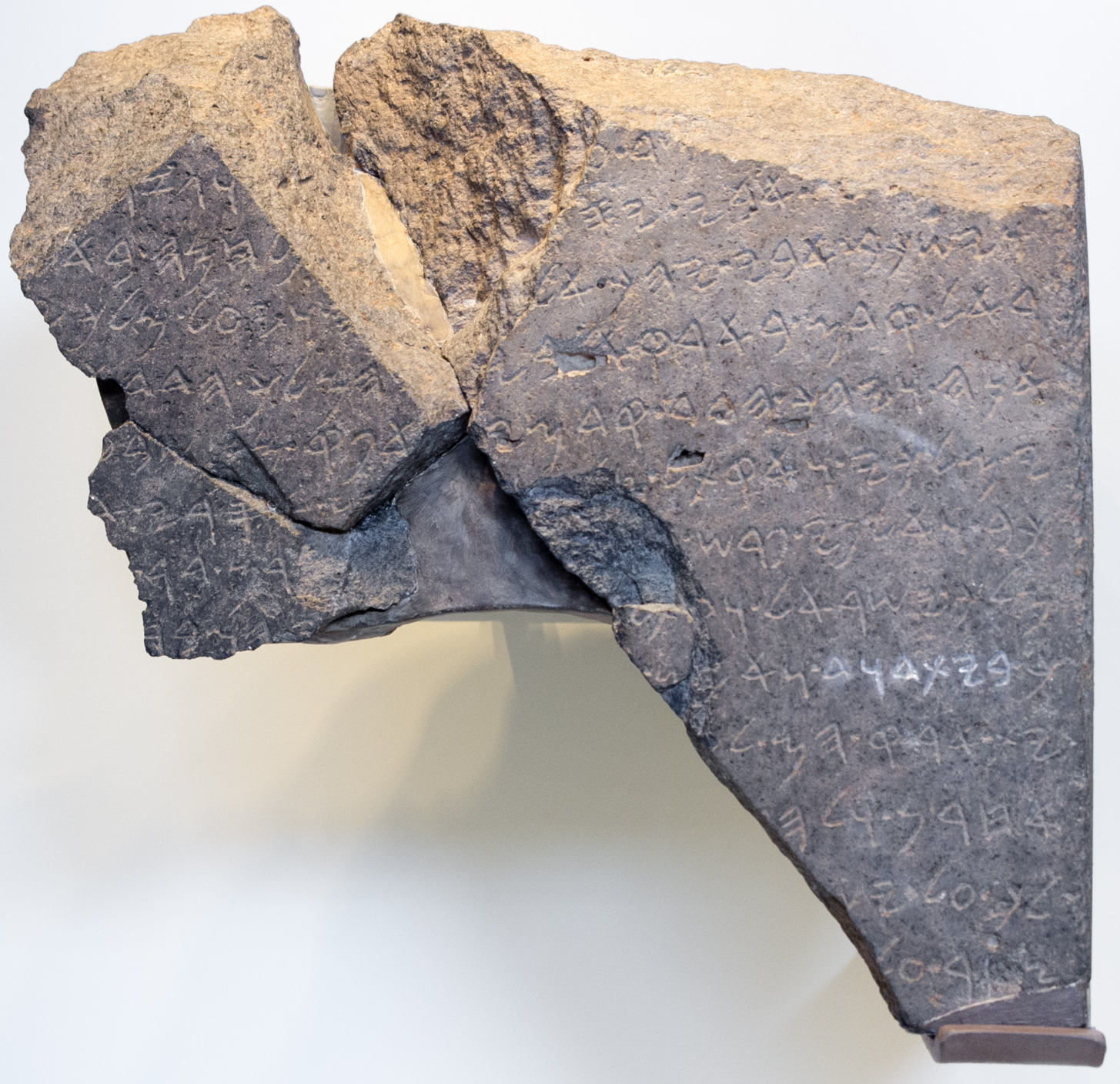
The Tel Dan Stele, dating from circa the 9th century BCE, was discovered in Tel Dan and is the most important archaeological artifact to mention the House of David outside of the Bible

The author of the inscription on the Tel Dan Stele (fragments of which were found in 1993 and 1994 during archaeological excavations of the site of Tel Dan) claimed to have slain both the king of the House of David in Judah, Ahaziah, and the king of Israel, Jehoram. The most likely author of this monument is Hazael of the Arameans. Although the inscription may be a contemporary witness of this period, kings of this period were inclined to boast and make exaggerated claims; it is not clear whether Jehu killed the two kings (as the Bible reports) or Hazael (as the Tel Dan Stele reports), or if Jehu acted in concert with Hazael. Bryant G. Wood notes that in 1 Kings 19:15 the prophet Elijah was directed by God to go to Damascus and anoint Hazael king of Aram, "an unusual circumstance". Hazael later resumed his attacks on Israel.

== Chronological notes ==
The calendars for reckoning the years of kings in Judah and Israel were offset by six months, that of Judah starting in Tishri (in the fall) and that of Israel in Nisan (in the spring). Cross-synchronizations between the two kingdoms therefore often allow narrowing of the beginning or ending dates of a king to within a six-month range. For Ahaziah, the Scriptural data allow the narrowing of his accession to some time between Nisan 1 of 841 BCE and the day before Tishri 1 of the same year. His death occurred within this six-month period. These dates are one year earlier than those given in the third edition of Thiele's Mysterious Numbers of the Hebrew Kings, thereby correcting an internal consistency that Thiele never resolved.

Leslie McFall proposed a coregency between Ahaziah and his father Jehoram that was occasioned by the disease Jehoram contracted one year before he died (2 Chronicles 21:18–19). McFall's conception of a one-year coregency is consistent with the seriousness of the disease contracted by Jehoram, such as would make it a matter of common sense to appoint a coregent. It would explain the apparent discrepancy between 2 Kings 8:25 and 2 Kings 9:29. In the first reference, Ahaziah is said to begin in the 12th year of Jehoram of Israel, whereas the second gives it as Jehoram's 11th year. The first reference would be to the start of the sole reign, the second to the start of the coregency, one year earlier. Thiele's explanation of the apparent discrepancy between these two verses was that 2 Kings 8:25 was by non-accession reckoning and 2 Kings 9:29 by accession reckoning, reflecting the transition that Thiele said was taking place at this time from non-accession reckoning back to accession reckoning for the kingdom of Judah. Although Thiele's suggestion has merit, McFall's coregency has been adopted in the infobox below. This begins one-year coregency sometime in the six months on or after Nisan 1 of 842 BCE, which was in the 11th year of Jehoram of Israel (2 Kings 9:29) by Israel's Nisan calendar and non-accession reckoning (2 Kings 9:29). By a Judean calendar the year would be 843/842 BCE, i.e. the year starting in Tishri of 843 BCE. The start of his sole reign would be in the six months following Nisan 1 of 841 BCE, in the 12th year of Jehoram of Israel (2 Kings 8:25); his death also occurred in this six-month interval.

== See also ==
- List of biblical figures identified in extra-biblical sources

Ahaziah of Judah House of David
Preceded by Jehoram	King of Judah; Coregency: 842–841 BCE; Sole reign: 841 BCE	Succeeded by Athaliah
