= Jehoash of Judah =

Eighth king of Judah (836-796 BCE)

Joash
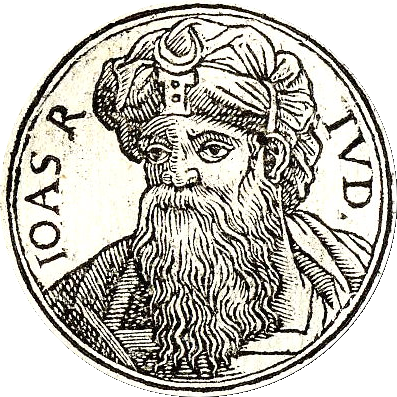
- Jehoash from Guillaume Rouillé's Promptuarii Iconum Insigniorum, 1553

King of Judah
- Reign: c. 836–796 BCE
- Predecessor: Athaliah
- Successor: Amaziah
- Born: c. 843 BCE; Jerusalem, Kingdom of Judah
- Died: c. 796 BCE (aged 46 or 47); Millo, Jerusalem
- Burial: City of David
- Consort: Jehoaddan of Jerusalem
- Issue: Amaziah; Amoz
- House: House of David
- Father: Ahaziah, King of Judah
- Mother: Zibiah of Beersheba

Jehoash (Hebrew: יְהוֹאָשׁ, romanized: Yəhōʾāš, lit. '"Yah-given"'; Greek: Ιωας; Latin: Ioas), also known as Joash (in King James Version), Joas (in Douay–Rheims) or Joás (Hebrew: יוֹאָשׁ, romanized: Yōʾāš), was the eighth king of Judah, and the sole surviving son of Ahaziah after the massacre of the royal family ordered by his grandmother, Athaliah. His mother was Zibiah of Beersheba. Jehoash was 7 years old when he ascended to the throne, reigning for 40 years. (2 Kings 12:1, 2 Chronicles 24:1) He was succeeded by his son, Amaziah of Judah. He is said to have been righteous "all the days of Jehoiada the priest" (2 Chronicles 24:2) but to have deviated from fidelity to Yahweh after Jehoiada's death (2 Chronicles 24:17–19).

William F. Albright has dated his reign to 837–800 BCE, while E. R. Thiele offers the dates 835–796 BCE.

== Early life ==
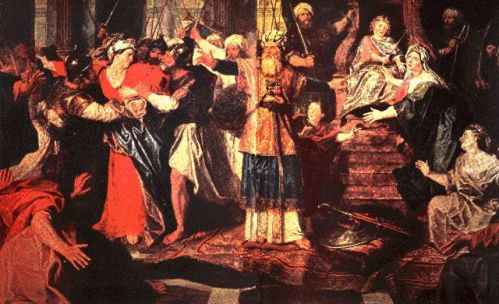
Athaliah Expelled from the Temple by Antoine Coypel, 1699

According to the Hebrew Bible, following the death of his father, Ahaziah, Jehoash was spared from the rampages of Ahaziah's mother, Athaliah, by Jehoash's paternal aunt, Jehosheba, who was married to the high priest, Jehoiada. After hiding him in the Temple for seven years, Jehoiada had Jehoash crowned and anointed king in a coup d'état against Athaliah, who had usurped the Throne of David. Athaliah was killed during the coup.

After Jehoash was crowned, the covenant was renewed between God, the king, and the nation. The Tyrian cult of Baal, which was introduced under Jehoram and strengthened under Athaliah, was suppressed. Mattan, the priest of Baal, was killed as altars to Baal were destroyed. For the first time in Judah's history, the Temple in Jerusalem and its priesthood achieved national importance.

== Achievements ==
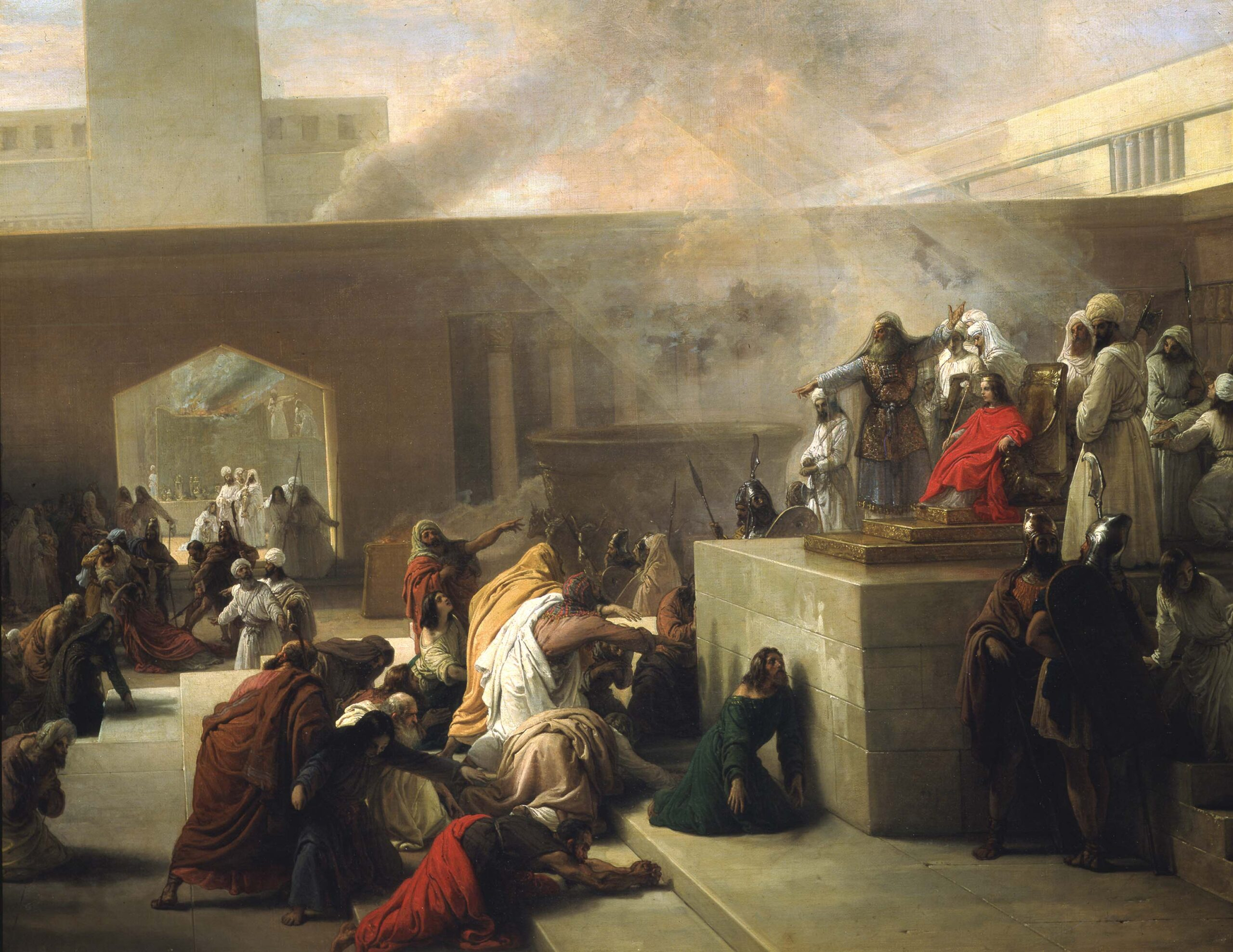
Coronation of Joash, depicted by Francesco Hayez, c. 1840

According to the accounts in 2 Kings 12, Jehoash directed that the money paid by worshippers at the Temple should be used to fund its repair. By the 23rd year of his reign, he was aware that the priests had failed to implement a restoration program, and so he made his own arrangements, funded by popular contributions, to restore the temple to its original condition and further strengthen it. The account in 2 Chronicles 24 follows the account in 2 Kings 12, but adds the detail that it was "as a form of taxation, similar to the tax collected in the desert in connection with the tabernacle". At the instigation of Jehoiada, King Joash undertook the restoration of the Temple. The Work was completed so expeditiously that one living at the time the Temple was erected by Solomon was permitted to see the new structure shortly before his death. This good fortune befell Jehoiada himself, the son of Benaiah, commander-in-chief of the army under Solomon.

Archaeological finds in the 2020s have suggested that Jerusalem expanded considerably around the time of Jehoash's rule. Carbon-dated findings from the Pool of Siloam indicate that a massive dam wall was built there c. 800–795 BCE, and other large public works in the City of David appear to date to the 9th century BCE.

== Later life and death ==
So long as Jehoash continued under the tutelage of Jehoiada, he was a pious king; Jehoash listened to the princes of Judah instead of the priests. This led him to abandon worshipping Yahweh and turning instead to idols and the Asherim as previous kings of Israel did. 2 Chronicles 24 narrates how Jehoash son-in-law the prophet Zechariah, Jehoiada's son and successor, rebuked them for forsaking God, which resulted in Jehoash ordering his execution by stoning. The author of the Books of Chronicles criticizes this cruel act strongly. "Thus Joash the king remembered not the kindness which Jehoiada his father had done to him, but slew his son. And when he died, he said, The LORD look upon it, and requite it". The author also attributes Jehoash's deeds to the oppression suffered at the hands of Aramean invaders as God's judgment.

According to the account in 2 Kings 12, when King Hazael of Syria marched on Jerusalem, Jehoash surrendered all the gold of the royal and sacred treasuries, thereby persuading him to call off his attack, but according to the account in 2 Chronicles, the Syrian army "destroyed all the leaders of the people from among the people, and sent all their spoil to the king of Damascus", "execut[ing] judgment against Joash" and leaving him severely wounded.

Jehoash was eventually assassinated by his own servants at Beth Millo, and his assassination is portrayed as an act of revenge for the blood of Zechariah, the son of Jehoiada. Jehoash was buried together with his fathers in the City of David, although he was "not (buried) in the sepulchres of the kings". He was succeeded as king by his son Amaziah (אמציה).

The rabbis of the Talmud declared, based upon a rabbinic tradition, that Prophet Amoz was the brother of Amaziah, the king of Judah at that time (and, as a result, that Prophet Isaiah himself was a member of the royal family).

== In rabbinic literature ==
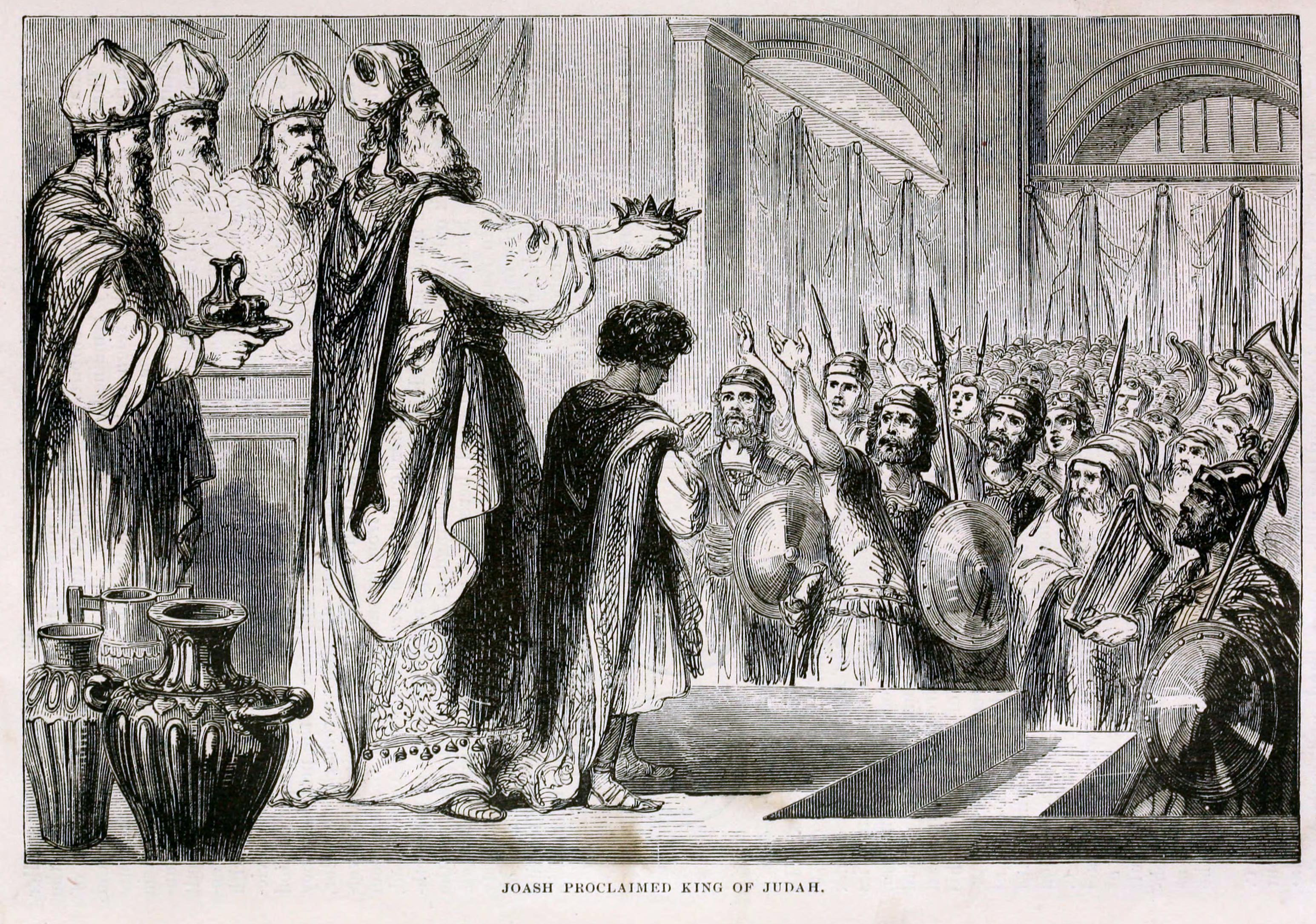
Joash proclaimed king of Judah

The extermination of the male descendants of David was considered divine retribution for his responsibility in the extermination of the priests by Saul, who had commanded his servant Doeg the Edomite to perform this task (comp. 1 Sam. 22:17–23). Jehoash escaped death because in the latter case one priest, Abiathar, survived (Sanh. 95b). The hiding-place of Jehoash was, according to R. Eleazar, one of the chambers behind the Holy of Holies; according to R. Samuel b. Naḥman, it was one of the upper chambers of the Temple (Cant. R. i. 66).

Although a king who is the son of a king need not be anointed, an exception was made in the case of Jehoash, as well as of Solomon and Jeoahaz, the succession of each of whom was contested. (Lev. R. x. 8) Particular mention is made of the crown placed on Joash's head (2 Kings 11:12), because it fitted exactly, signifying that he was qualified for kingship. (Ab. Zarah 44a)

Joash was one of the four men who pretended to be gods. He was persuaded thereto particularly by the princes, who said to him. "Wert thou not a god thou couldst not come out alive from the Holy of Holies" (Ex R. viii. 3). "Joash himself, the murderer of Zechariah, met with an evil end. He fell into the hands of the Syrians, and they ambushed him in their barbarous, immoral way. Before he could recover from the suffering inflicted upon him." he was assassinated by two of his servants, one of whom was a son of an Ammonite woman and the other the offspring of a Moabite (II Chron. xxiv. 26); for God said: "Let the descendants of the two ungrateful families chastise the ungrateful Joash" (Yalk., Ex. 262).

== Jehoash Tablet ==
In 2001, an unprovenanced inscription was published, known as the Jehoash Inscription or Temple Inscription, which appears to be a record of repairs made to Solomon's Temple during Jehoash's reign. The tablet consists of 15 lines of Hebrew text inscribed on a piece of tabular black stone. Following extensive scientific tests, the Israeli archaeological authorities declared it to be a forgery and attempted but failed to prosecute the perpetrator; a number of experts maintain that it is not a forgery.

== Chronological notes ==
The calendars for reckoning the years of kings in Judah and Israel were offset by six months, that of Judah starting in Tishri (in the fall) and that of Israel in Nisan (in the spring). Cross-synchronizations between the two kingdoms therefore often allow narrowing of the beginning or ending dates of a king to within a six-month range. For Jehoash, the Scriptural data allow the narrowing of his accession to some time between Nisan 1 of 835 BCE and the day before Tishri 1 of the same year. His death occurred at some time between Nisan 1 of 796 BCE and the day before Tishri 1 of that same year. During his reign, the Judean court recorders were still using the non-accession system of measuring years that was adopted in the days of Jehoshaphat from the practice of the northern kingdom, whereby the king's first partial year in office was counted as his first year of reign.

== Christian texts ==
The Gospel of Matthew does not list Jehoash of Judah in the genealogy of Jesus, Jehoash being one of four kings of Judah so omitted, the other three being Ahaziah, Amaziah, and Jehoiakim.

Jehoash of Judah House of David
Preceded by Athaliah	King of Judah; 836–797 BCE	Succeeded by Amaziah
