= List of state leaders in the 8th century BC =

State leaders in the 9th century BC – State leaders in the 7th century BC – State leaders by year

This is a list of state leaders in the 8th century BC (800–701 BC).

== Africa: North ==
Carthage

- Carthage (complete list) –

- Dido, Queen (814–c.760 BC)

Kush and Egypt's Third Intermediate Period

- Twenty-second Dynasty of the Third Intermediate Period (complete list) –

- Shoshenq III, Pharaoh (837–798 BC)
- Shoshenq IV, Pharaoh (798–785 BC)
- Pami, Pharaoh (785–778 BC)
- Shoshenq V, Pharaoh (778–740 BC)
- Pedubast II, Pharaoh (740–730 BC)
- Osorkon IV, Pharaoh (730–716 BC)

- Twenty-third Dynasty of the Third Intermediate Period (complete list) –

- Shoshenq VI, Pharaoh (804–798 BC)
- Osorkon III, Pharaoh (798–769 BC)
- Takelot III, Pharaoh (774–759 BC)
- Rudamun, Pharaoh (759–755 BC)
- Ini, Pharaoh (755–750 BC)
- Peftjauawybast, Pharaoh (754–720 BC)

- Twenty-fourth Dynasty of the Third Intermediate Period (complete list) –

- Tefnakhte I, Pharaoh (732–725 BC)
- Bakenranef, Pharaoh (725–720 BC)

- Kingdom of Kush (complete list) –

- Alara, King (c.795–752 BC)
- Kashta, King (c.765–752 BC)

- Kush: Twenty-fifth Dynasty of the Third Intermediate Period (complete list)

- Kashta, Pharaoh (c.760–c.752 BC)
- Piye, Pharaoh (c.752–721 BC)
- Shabaka, Pharaoh (721–707 BC)
- Shebitku, Pharaoh (707–690 BC)

== Asia ==
=== Asia: East ===
China: Spring and Autumn period

- Zhou, China: Eastern Zhou (complete list) –

- Ping, King (770–720 BC)
- Huan, King (719–697 BC)

- Cai (complete list) –

- Xi, Marquis (809–761 BC)
- Gòng, Marquis (761–760 BC)
- Dai, Marquis (759–750 BC)
- Xuan, Marquis (749–715 BC)
- Huan, Marquis (714–695 BC)

- Cao (complete list) –

- Hui, Count (794–760 BC)
- Fei, Count (760–760 BC)
- Mu, Duke (759–757 BC)
- Huan, Duke (756–702 BC)
- Zhuang, Duke (701–671 BC)

- Chen (complete list) –

- Ping, Duke (777–755 BC BC)
- Wen, Duke (754–745 BC BC)
- Huan, Duke (744–707 BC BC)
- Tuo, usurper ruler (707–706 BC BC)
- Li, Duke (706–700 BC BC)

- Chu (complete list) –

- Ruo'ao, ruler (790–764 BC)
- Xiao'ao, ruler (763–758 BC)
- Fenmao, ruler (757–741 BC)
- Wu, King (740–690 BC)

- Jin (complete list) –

- Wen, Marquis (780–746 BC)
- Zhao, Marquis (745–740 BC)
- Xiao, Marquis (739–724 BC)
- E, Marquis (723–718 BC)
- Ai, Marquis (717–709 BC)
- Xiaozi, Marquis (708–705 BC)
- Min, Marquis (704–678 BC)

- Lu (complete list) –

- Xiao, Duke (795–769 BC)
- Hui, Duke (768–723 BC)
- Yin, Duke (722–712 BC)
- Huan, Duke (711–694 BC)

- Qi: House of Jiang (complete list) –

- Zhuang I, Duke (794–731 BC)
- Xi, Duke (730–698 BC)

- Qin (complete list) –

- Xiang, Duke (777–766 BC)
- Wen, Duke (765–716 BC)
- Xian, Duke (715–704 BC)
- Chuzi I, Duke (703–698 BC)

- Song (complete list) –

- Dai, Duke (799–766 BC)
- Wu, Duke (765–748 BC)
- Xuan, Duke (747–729 BC)
- Mu, Duke (728–720 BC)
- Shang, Duke (719–711 BC)
- Zhuang, Duke (710–692 BC)

- Wey (complete list) –

- Wu, Duke (812–758 BC)
- Zhuang, Duke (757–735 BC)
- Huan, Duke (734–719 BC)
- Xuan, Duke (718–700 BC)

- Zheng (complete list) –

- Huan, Duke (806–771 BC)
- Wu, Duke (770–744 BC)
- Zhuang, Duke (743–701 BC)
- Zhao, Duke (701 BC, 696–695 BC)

=== Asia: Southeast ===
Vietnam

- Hồng Bàng dynasty (complete list) –

- Kỷ line, (c.853–c.755 BC)
- Canh line, King (c.754–c.661 BC)

=== Asia: South ===
- Magadha of India —

Brihadratha dynasty

- Ripunjaya, King (849–799 BC)

Pradyota Dynasty
- Pradyota, King (779–776 BC)
- Palaka, King (776–752 BC)
- Visakhayupa, King (752–702 BC)
- Janaka, King (702–681 BC)

- Pradyota dynasty

- Pradyota
- Palaka
- Visakhayupa
- Ajaka

=== Asia: West ===
- Aram-Damascus (complete list) –

- Hazael, King (c.842–800 BC)
- Ben-Hadad III, King (796–792 BC)
- Rezin, King (792–732 BC)

- Elam: Humban-Tahrid dynasty (complete list) –

- Humban-Tahrah I, King (c.760–743 BC)
- Humban-Nikash I, King (743–717 BC)
- Shutur-Nahhunte II, King (717–699 BC)

- Diauehi –

- Utupurshi, King (c.810–770 BC)

- Tyre, Phoenecia —

- Pygmalion, King (831–785 BC), Dido founded Carthage during his reign.
- Ithobaal II, King (750–739 BC)
- Hiram II, King (739–730 BC)
- Mattan II, King (730–729 BC)
- Elulaios, King (729–694 BC)

- Kingdom of Judah —

Chronologies as established by Albright
- Jehoash, King (837–800 BC)
- Amaziah, King (800–783 BC)
- Uzziah (Azariah), King (783–742 BC)
- Jotham, King (742–735 BC)
- Ahaz, King (735–715 BC)
- Hezekiah, King (715–687 BC)

- Kingdom of (northern) Israel —

Chronologies as established by Albright
- Joash/Jehoash, King (801–786 BC)
- Jeroboam II, King (786–746 BC)
- Zechariah, King (746 BC)
- Shallum, King (745 BC)
- Menahem, King (745–738 BC)
- Pekahiah, King (738–737 BC)
- Pekah, King (737–732 BC)
- Hoshea, King (732–722 BC)

- Assyria: Neo-Assyrian Period

- Adad-nirari III (811–783 BC)
- Shalmaneser IV (783–773 BC)
- Ashur-Dan III (773–755 BC)
- Ashur-nirari V (755–745 BC)
- Tiglath-Pileser III (745–727 BC)
- Shalmaneser V (727–722 BC)
- Sargon II (722–705 BC)
- Sennacherib (705–681 BC)

- Middle Babylonian period: Dynasty of E, Dynasty VIII (complete list) –

- Ninurta-apla-X, King (c.800–790 BC)
- Marduk-bel-zeri, King (c.790–780 BC)
- Marduk-apla-usur, King (c.780–769 BC)
- Eriba-Marduk, King (c.769–761 BC)
- Nabu-shuma-ishkun, King (c.761–748 BC)
- Nabu-nasir, King (748–734 BC)
- Nabu-nadin-zeri, King (734–732 BC)
- Nabu-suma-ukin II, King (732 BC)

- Dynasty IX of Babylon, Neo-Assyrian Empire

- Nabu-mukin-zeri (732–729 BC)
- Tiglath-Pileser III (729–727 BC)
- Shalmaneser V (727–722 BC)
- Marduk-apla-iddina II (722–710 BC)
- Sharrukin II (Sargon II) 710–705 BC)
- Sin-ahhe-eriba (Sennacherib) 705–703 BC)
- Marduk-zakir-shumi II (703 BC)
- Marduk-apla-iddina II (703 BC) (restored)
- Bel-ibni (703–700 BC)

- Lydia (complete list) –

- Meles, a.k.a. Myrsus (8th century BC)
- Candaules, a.k.a. Myrsilus (died c.687 BC)

- Urartu (complete list) –

- Menua, King (810–785 BC)
- Argishti I, King (785–763 BC)
- Sarduri II, King (763–735 BC)
- Rusa I, King (735–714 BC)
- Argishti II, King (714–680 BC)

== Europe ==
=== Europe: Balkans ===
- Athens (complete list) –

- Thespieus, Life Archon (824–797 BC)
- Agamestor, Life Archon (796–778 BC)
- Aeschylus, Life Archon (778–755 BC)
- Alcmaeon, Life Archon (755–753 BC)
- Charops, Decennial Archon (753–743 BC)
- Aesimides, Decennial Archon (743–733 BC)
- Clidicus, Decennial Archon (733–723 BC)
- Hippomenes, Decennial Archon (723–713 BC)
- Leocrates, Decennial Archon (713–703 BC)

- Sparta: Eurypontid dynasty (complete list) –

- Polydectes, King (c.830–800 BC)
- Eunomus, King (c.800–780 BC)
- Charilaus, King (c. 780–750 BC)
- Nicander, King (c.750–725 BC)
- Theopompus, King (c.725–675 BC)

=== Europe: South ===
- Roman Kingdom (complete list) –

- Romulus, King (753–716 BC)Mythical
- Numa Pompilius, King (716–672 BC)
