= List of state leaders in the 7th century BC =

State leaders in the 8th century BC – State leaders in the 6th century BC – State leaders by year

This is a list of state leaders in the 7th century BC (700–601 BC).

== Africa: North ==
Cyrene

- Cyrene (complete list) –

- Battus I, King (630–600 BC)

Egypt's Third Intermediate Period and Kush

- Kush: Twenty-fifth Dynasty of the Third Intermediate Period (complete list) –

- Shebitku, Pharaoh (707/706–690 BC)
- Taharqa, Pharaoh (690–664 BC)
- Tantamani, Pharaoh (664–653 BC)

- Kingdom of Kush (complete list) –

- Atlanersa, King (653–640 BC)
- Senkamanisken, King (640–620 BC)
- Anlamani, King (620–600 BC)

Egypt: Late Period

- Twenty-sixth Dynasty of the Late Period (complete list) –

- Psamtik I, Pharaoh (664–610 BC)
- Necho II, Pharaoh (610–595 BC)

== Asia ==
=== Asia: East ===
China: Spring and Autumn period

- Zhou, China: Eastern Zhou (complete list) –

- Huan, King (719–697 BC)
- Zhuang, King (696–682 BC)
- Xi, King (681–677 BC)
- Hui, King (676–652 BC)
- Xiang, King (651–619 BC)
- Qing, King (618–613 BC)
- Kuang, King (612–607 BC)
- Ding, King (606–586 BC)

- Cai (complete list) –

- Huan, Marquis (714–695 BC)
- Ai, Marquis (694–675 BC)
- Mu, Marquis (674–646 BC)
- Zhuang, Marquis (645–612 BC)
- Wen, Marquis (611–592 BC)

- Cao (complete list) –

- Zhuang, Duke (701–671 BC)
- Li, Duke (670–662 BC)
- Zhao, Duke (661–653 BC)
- Gong, Duke (652–618 BC)
- Wen, Duke (617–595 BC)

- Chen (complete list) –

- Li, Duke (706–700 BC BC)
- Zhuang, Duke (699–693 BC BC)
- Xuan, Duke (692–648 BC BC)
- Mu, Duke (647–632 BC BC)
- Gong, Duke (631–614 BC BC)
- Ling, Duke (7th century BC)
- Xia Zhengshu, ruler (7th–6th century BC)

- Chu (complete list) –

- Wu, King (740–690 BC)
- Wen, King (689–677 BC)
- Du'ao, ruler (676–672 BC)
- Cheng, King (671–626 BC)
- Mu, King (625–614 BC)
- Zhuang, King (613–591 BC)

- Jin (complete list) –

- Min, Marquis (704–678 BC)
- Huan Shu of Quwo, ruler (745–732 BC)
- Zhuang Bo of Quwo, ruler (731–716 BC)
- Wu, Duke of Quwo (715–679 BC), of Jin (678–677 BC)
- Xian, Duke (676–651 BC)
- Xiqi, ruler (651 BC)
- Zhuozi, ruler (651 BC)
- Hui, Duke (650–637 BC)
- Huai, Duke (637 BC)
- Wen, Duke (636–628 BC)
- Xiang, Duke (627–621 BC)
- Ling, Duke (620–607 BC)
- Cheng, Duke (606–600 BC)

- Lu (complete list) –

- Huan, Duke (711–694 BC)
- Zhuang, Duke (693–662 BC)
- Ziban, ruler (662 BC)
- Min, Duke (661–660 BC)
- Xi, Duke (659–627 BC)
- Wen I, Duke (626–609 BC)
- Xuan, Duke (608–591 BC)

- Qi: House of Jiang (complete list) –

- Xi, Duke (730–698 BC)
- Xiang, Duke (697–686 BC)
- Wuzhi, ruler (686 BC)
- Huan, Duke (685–643 BC)
- Wukui, ruler (643 BC)
- Xiao, Duke (642–633 BC)
- Zhao, Duke (632–613 BC)
- She, ruler (613 BC)
- Yì, Duke (612–609 BC)
- Hui, Duke (608–599 BC)

- Qin (complete list) –

- Chuzi I, Duke (703–698 BC)
- Wu, Duke (697–678 BC)
- De, Duke (677–676 BC)
- Xuan, Duke (675–664 BC)
- Cheng, Duke (663–660 BC)
- Mu, Duke (659–621 BC)
- Kang, Duke (620–609 BC)
- Gong, Duke (608–604 BC)
- Huan, Duke (603–577 BC)

- Song (complete list) –

- Zhuang, Duke (710–692 BC)
- Min, Duke (691–682 BC)
- You,, Duke (3 months)
- Huan, Duke (681–651 BC)
- Xiang, Duke (650–637 BC)
- Cheng, Duke (636–620 BC)
- Yu, Duke (a month)
- Zhao, Duke (619–611 BC)
- Wen, Duke (610–589 BC)

- Wey (complete list) –

- Xuan, Duke (718–700 BC)
- Hui, Duke (699–669 BC)
- Yi, Duke (668–661 BC)
- Dai, Duke (660 BC)
- Wen, Duke (659–635 BC)
- Cheng, Duke (634–600 BC)

- Yue (complete list) –

- Wuren of Yue, Marquis (7th–6th century BC)

- Zheng (complete list) –

- Zhao, Duke (701 BC, 696–695 BC)
- Li, Duke (700–697 BC, 679–673 BC)
- Ziwei, Prince (694 BC)
- Zheng Ziying, ruler (693–680 BC)
- Wen, Duke (672–628 BC)
- Mu, Duke (627–606 BC)
- Ling, Duke (605 BC)
- Xiang, Duke (604–587 BC)

=== Asia: Southeast ===
Vietnam

- Hồng Bàng dynasty (complete list) –

- Canh line, King (c.754–c.661 BC)
- Tân line, King (c.660–c.569 BC)

=== Asia: South ===
- Magadha of India, Brihadratha dynasty —

- Janaka, King (702–681 BC)
- Nandivardhdhana, King (681–661 BC)

- Pradyota dynasty

- Varttivarddhana

- Shakya Dynasty

- Sinahana

=== Asia: West ===
- Elam: Humban-Tahrid dynasty (complete list) –

- Shutur-Nahhunte II, King (717–699 BC)
- Hallushu-Inshushinak, King (699–693 BC)
- Kutir-Nahhunte III, King (693–692 BC)
- Humban-Numena III, King (692–688 BC)
- Humban-Haltash I, King (688–681 BC)
- Humban-Haltash II, King (681–675 BC)
- Urtak, King (c.674–664 BC)
- Tepti-Humban-Inshushinak I/Teumman, King (664–653 BC)
- Humban-nikash II/Ummanigash, King (653–652 BC)
- Tammaritu I, King (653–652 BC)
- Tammaritu II, King (652–649, 647 BC)
- Inda-bigash, King (649–648 BC)
- Humban-haltash III/Ummanaldash, King (648–647, 646–645 BC)
- Humban-habua, King (647 BC)
- Tammaritu II, King (652–649, 647 BC)
- Pa'e, King (647–646 BC)
- Humban-haltash III/Ummanaldash, King (648–647, 646–645 BC)
- Indada, King (c.645–635 BC)
- Shutur-Nahhunte, King (c.635–610 BC)
- Humban-kitin, King (late 7th/early 6th century BC)

- Tyre, Phoenecia —

- Elulaios, King (729–694 BC)
- Abd Melqart, King (694–680 BC)
- Baal I, King (680–660 BC)

- Kingdom of Judah —

Chronologies as established by Albright
- Hezekiah, King (715–687 BC)
- Manasseh, King (687–642 BC)
- Amon, King (642–640 BC)
- Josiah, King (640–609 BC)
- Jehoahaz, King (Reigned for 3 months, 609 BC)
- Jehoiakim, King (609–598 BC)

- Assyria: Neo-Assyrian Period

- Sennacherib (705–681 BC)
- Esarhaddon (681–669 BC)
- Ashurbanipal (669–631/627 BC)
- Ashur-etil-ilani, (c.631–627 BC)
- Sin-shumu-lishir (626 BC)
- Sin-shar-ishkun, (c.627–612 BC)
- Ashur-uballit II (612 BC–c.609 BC)

- Dynasty IX of Babylon

- Bel-ibni (703–700 BC)
- Ashur-nadin-shumi (700–694 BC)
- Nergal-ushezib (694–693 BC)
- Mushezib-Marduk (693–689 BC)
- Sin-ahhe-eriba (Sennacherib) (689–681 BC)
- Ashur-ahha-iddina (Esarhaddon) (681–669 BC)
- Shamash-shum-ukin (668–648 BC)
- Kandalanu (648–627 BC)
- Sin-shumu-lishir (626 BC)
- Sinsharishkun, (c.627–620 BC)

- Neo-Babylonian Empire: Dynasty XI (complete list) –

- Nabopolassar, King (c.626–605 BC)
- Nebuchadnezzar II, King (c.605–562 BC)

- Lydia (complete list) –

- Candaules, aka Myrsilus, King (died c.687 BC)
- Gyges, King (c.687–c.652 BC)
- Ardys, King (c.652–c.603 BC)
- Sadyattes, King (c.603–c.591 BC)

- Median Empire (complete list) –

- Deioces, King (694–665 BC)
- Phraortes, King (665–633 BC)
- Cyaxares, King (625–585 BC)

- Anshan (complete list) –

- Teispes, King (c.655–640 BC)
- Cyrus I, King (640–580 BC)

- Urartu (complete list) –

- Argishti II, King (714–680 BC)
- Rusa II, King (680–639 BC)
- Sarduri III, King (639–635 BC)
- Erimena, King (635–629 BC)
- Rusa III, King (629–590/615 BC)
- Sarduri IV, King (615–595 BC)

== Europe ==
=== Europe: Balkans ===
- Athens (complete list) –

- Apsander, Decennial Archon (703–693 BC)
- Eryxias, Decennial Archon (693–683 BC)
- Creon, Archon (682–681 BC)
- Lysiades, Archon (681–680 BC)
- Tlesias, Archon (680–679 BC)

- Leostratus, Archon (671–670 BC)
- Pisistratus, Archon (669–668 BC)
- Autosthenes, Archon (668–667 BC)
- Miltiades, Archon (664–663 BC)
- Miltiades, Archon (659–658 BC)
- Dropides, Archon (645–644 BC)

- Damasias, Archon (639–638 BC)
- Epaenetus (?), Archon (634–633 BC)
- Megacles, Archon (632–631 BC)
- Aristaechmus, Archon (624–623 BC)
- Heniochides, Archon (615–614 BC)
- Aristocles, Archon (605–604 BC)

- Corinth –

- Cypselus, Tyrant (c.667–c.627 BC)
- Periander, Tyrant (c.627–c.587 BC)

- Macedonia: Argead dynasty (complete list) –

- Perdiccas I, King (700–678 BC)
- Argaeus I, King (678–640 BC)
- Philip I, King (640–602 BC)
- Aeropus I, King (602–576 BC)

- Sparta: Eurypontid dynasty (complete list) –

- Theopompus, King (c.725–675 BC)
- Anaxandridas I (c.675–645 BC)
- Zeuxidamas (c.645–625 BC)
- Anaxidamus (c.625–600 BC)
- Archidamus I (c.600–575 BC)

=== Europe: South ===
- Roman Kingdom (complete list) –

- Tullus Hostilius, King (673–642 BC)
- Ancus Marcius, King (642–617 BC)
- Lucius Tarquinius Priscus, King (616–579 BC)
