= List of state leaders in the 10th century BC =

State leaders in the 11th century BC – State leaders in the 9th century BC – State leaders by year

This is a list of state leaders in the 10th century BC (1000–901 BC).

== Africa: Northeast ==
Egypt: Third Intermediate Period

- Twenty-first Dynasty of the Third Intermediate Period (complete list) –

- Amenemope, Pharaoh (1001–992 BC)
- Osorkon the Elder, Pharaoh (992–986 BC)
- Siamun, Pharaoh (986–967 BC)
- Psusennes II, Pharaoh (967–943 BC)

- Twenty-second Dynasty of the Third Intermediate Period (complete list) –

- Shoshenq I, Pharaoh (943–922 BC)
- Osorkon I, Pharaoh (922–887 BC)

Kush

- Kingdom of Kush (complete list) –

- Kandake Makeda, King (c.1005–950 BC)
- Aserkamani, King (c.950 BC–?)

== Asia ==
=== Asia: East ===
China

- Zhou, China: Western Zhou (complete list) –

- Kang, King (c.1020–996 BC)
- Zhao, King (c.977/975–957 BC)
- Mu, King (c.977–922 BC)
- Gong, King (c.922–900 BC)

=== Asia: Southeast ===
Vietnam

- Hồng Bàng dynasty (complete list) –

- Mậu line, (c.968–c.854 BC)
- Kỷ line, (c.853–c.755 BC)

=== Asia: West ===
- Kingdom of united Israel –

These chronologies are as established by Albright
- David, King (1000–962 BC)
- Solomon, King (962–922 BC)

- Kingdom of Judah –

- Rehoboam, King (922–915 BC)
- Abijah, King (915–913 BC)
- Asa, King (913–873 BC)

- Kingdom of (northern) Israel –

- Jeroboam I, King (922–901 BC)
- Nadab, King (901–900 BC)

- Tyre, Phoenecia –

- Abibaal, King (993–981 BC)
- Hiram I, King (980–947 BC), contemporary of David and Solomon
- Baal-Eser I, King (946–930 BC)
- Abdastartus, King (929–921 BC)
- Astartus, King (920–901 BC)

- Assyria: Middle Assyrian Period —

- Ashur-rabi II, King (c.1013–972 BC)
- Ashur-resh-ishi II, King (c.972–967 BC)
- Tiglath-Pileser II, King (c.967–935 BC)
- Ashur-Dan II, King (c.935–912 BC)

- Assyria: Neo-Assyrian Period —

- Adad-nirari II, King (912–891 BC)

- Middle Babylonian period: Bazi dynasty (complete list) –

- Eulmash-shakin-shumi, King (c.1004–987 BC)
- Ninurta-kudurri-usur I, King (c.987–985 BC)
- Shirikti-shuqamuna, King (c.985 BC)

- Middle Babylonian period: Elamite dynasty (complete list) –

- Mar-biti-apla-usur, King (c.985–979 BC)

- Middle Babylonian period: Dynasty of E (complete list) –

- Nabu-mukin-apli, King (c.979–943 BC)
- Ninurta-kudurri-usur II, King (c.943 BC)
- Mar-biti-ahhe-iddina, King (c.943–920 BC)
- Shamash-mudammiq, King (c.920–900 BC)

- Elam: Shutrukid dynasty (complete list) –

- Mar-biti-apla-usur, King (pre-983–post-978 BC)

== Europe: Balkans ==
- Athens: Life archons (complete list) –

- Archippus, Archon (1012–993 BC)
- Thersippus, Archon (993–952 BC)
- Phorbas, Archon (952–BC)
- Megacles, Archon (922–892 BC)

- Sparta (complete list) –

Agiad dynasty
- Eurysthenes (c.930 BC)
- Agis I (c.930–900 BC)
Eurypontid dynasty
- Procles (c.930 BC)
