= Lists of state leaders =

This list contains various lists of state leaders, defined as heads of state and/or heads of government. This list typically includes presidents, prime ministers or monarchs.

== General ==
- List of current heads of state and government
- List of current state leaders by date of assumption of office
- Lists of office-holders
- List of elected or appointed female heads of state or government
- List of longest-reigning monarchs
- List of current reigning monarchs by length of reign
- List of state leaders by age
  - List of longest-living state leaders
  - List of oldest living state leaders
- List of openly LGBTQ state leaders
- List of heads of state by diplomatic precedence
- List of state leaders who died in office
- List of state leaders who have been in exile
- List of state leaders who died in aviation accidents and incidents
- List of heads of state and government educated in the United States
- List of heads of state and government who were sentenced to death
- List of heads of state and government who were later imprisoned
- List of heads of state and government Nobel laureates
- List of state leaders deposed by foreign powers in the 20th and 21st century
- List of state leaders who died by suicide
- List of heads of the executive by approval rating

== By century ==
=== 3rd millennium ===
- Current heads of state and government
- 2020s
- 2010s
- 2000s

=== 2nd millennium ===
- 20th century (1951–2000)
- 20th century (1901–1950)
  - 20th-century British South Asia
- 19th century (1851–1900)
- 19th century (1801–1850)
  - 19th-century Holy Roman Empire
  - 19th-century British South Asia
- 18th century
  - 18th-century Holy Roman Empire
  - 18th-century British South Asia
- 17th century
  - 17th-century Holy Roman Empire
  - 17th-century South Asia
- 16th century
  - 16th-century Holy Roman Empire
  - 16th-century South Asia
- 15th century
  - 15th-century Holy Roman Empire
  - 15th-century South Asia
- 14th century
  - 14th-century Holy Roman Empire
- 13th century
  - 13th-century Holy Roman Empire
- 12th century
  - 12th-century Holy Roman Empire
- 11th century
  - 11th-century Holy Roman Empire

=== 1st millennium ===
- 10th century
  - 10th-century Holy Roman Empire
- 9th century
- 8th century
- 7th century
- 6th century
- 5th century
- 4th century
- 3rd century
- 2nd century
- 1st century

=== BC ===
- 1st century BC
- 2nd century BC
- 3rd century BC
- 4th century BC
- 5th century BC
- 6th century BC
- 7th century BC
- 8th century BC
- 9th century BC
- 10th century BC
- 11th century BC
- 12th century BC
- 13th century BC
- 14th century BC
- 15th century BC
- 16th century BC
- 17th century BC
- 18th century BC
- 19th century BC
- 20th century BC
- 4th and 3rd millennia BC
