= Marquis Li =

Marquis Li may refer to:

- Marquis Li of Cai (died 863 BC)
- Marquis Li of Jin (died 859 BC)
- Marquis Xi of Jin (died 823 BC), can also be romanized as Marquis Li of Jin
- Marquis Xi of Cai (died 761 BC), can also be romanized as Marquis Li of Cai
- Yu Jin (died 221), Cao Wei general, posthumously honored as Marquis Li

== See also ==
- Duke Li (disambiguation)
- Marquis Xi (disambiguation)
