= List of state leaders in the 9th century BC =

State leaders in the 10th century BC – State leaders in the 8th century BC – State leaders by year

This is a list of state leaders in the 9th century BC (900–801 BC).

== Africa: North ==
Carthage

- Carthage (complete list) –

- Dido, Queen (814–c.760 BC)

Egypt: Third Intermediate Period

- Twenty-second Dynasty of the Third Intermediate Period (complete list) –

- Osorkon I, Pharaoh (922–887 BC)
- Shoshenq II, Pharaoh (887–885 BC)
- Takelot I, Pharaoh (885–872 BC)
- Osorkon II, Pharaoh (872–837 BC)
- Shoshenq III, Pharaoh (837–798 BC)

- Twenty-third Dynasty of the Third Intermediate Period (complete list) –

- Harsiese A, Pharaoh (880–860 BC)
- Takelot II, Pharaoh (840–815 BC)
- Pedubast I, Pharaoh (829–804 BC)
- Iuput I, Pharaoh (829–804 BC)
- Shoshenq VI, Pharaoh (804–798 BC)

== Asia ==
=== Asia: East ===
China

- Zhou, China: Western Zhou (complete list) –

- Gong, King (c.922–900 BC)
- Yì, King (c.899–892 BC)
- Xiao, King (c.891–886 BC)
- Yí, King (c.885–878 BC)
- Li, King (c.877–841 BC)
- Gonghe Regency (841–828 BC)
- Xuan, King (827–782 BC)

=== Asia: Southeast ===
Vietnam

- Hồng Bàng dynasty (complete list) –

- Mậu line, (c.968–c.854 BC)
- Kỷ line, (c.853–c.755 BC)

=== Asia: South ===
- Magadha of India, Brihadratha dynasty —

- Satyajit, King (964–884 BC)
- Biswajit, King (884–849 BC)
- Ripunjaya, King (849–799 BC)

=== Asia: West ===
- Aram-Damascus (complete list) –

- Hadadezer, King (880–842 BC)
- Hazael, King (c.842–800 BC)

- Diauehi –

- Asia, King (c.850–825 BC)
- Utupurshi, King (c.810–770 BC)

- Tyre, Phoenecia —

- Deleastartus, King (900–889 BC)
- Astarymus, King (888–880 BC)
- Phelles, King (879 BC)
- Ithobaal I, King (878–847 BC)
- Baal-Eser II, King (846–841 BC)
- Mattan I, King (840–832 BC)
- Pygmalion, King (831–785 BC)

- Kingdom of Judah —

Chronologies as established by Albright
- Asa, King (913–873 BC)
- Jehoshaphat, King (873–849 BC)
- Jehoram, King (849–842 BC)
- Ahaziah, King (842–842 BC)
- Athaliah, Queen (842–837 BC)
- Jehoash, King (837–800 BC)

- Kingdom of (northern) Israel —

Chronologies as established by Albright
- Nadab, King (901–900 BC)
- Baasha, King (900–877 BC)
- Elah, King (877–876 BC)
- Zimri, King (876 885 BC)
- Omri, King (876–869 BC)
- Ahab, King (869–850 BC)
- Ahaziah, King (850–849 BC)
- Joram/Jehoram, King (849–842 BC)
- Jehu, King (842–815 BC)
- Jehoahaz, King (815–801 BC)
- Joash/Jehoash, King (801–786 BC)

- Assyria: Neo-Assyrian Period

- Adad-nirari II, King (912–891 BC)
- Tukulti-Ninurta II, King (891–884 BC)
- Ashur-nasir-pal II, King (884–859 BC)
- Shalmaneser III, King (859–824 BC)
- Shamshi-Adad V, King (824–811 BC)
- Shammu-ramat, regent (811–808 BC)
- Adad-nirari III, King (811–783 BC)

- Middle Babylonian period: Dynasty of E, Dynasty VIII (complete list) –

- Shamash-mudammiq, King (c.920–900 BC)
- Nabu-shuma-ukin I, King (c.900–888 BC)
- Nabu-apla-iddina, King (c.888–855 BC)
- Marduk-zakir-shumi I, King (c.855–819 BC)
- Marduk-balassu-iqbi, King (c.819–813 BC)
- Baba-aha-iddina, King (c.813–811 BC)
- five other kings, (c.811–800 BC)

- Urartu (complete list) –

- Arame, King (858–844 BC)
- Lutipri, King (844–834 BC)
- Sarduri I, King (834–828 BC)
- Ishpuini, King (828–810 BC)
- Menua, King (810–785 BC)

== Europe: Balkans ==
- Athens (complete list) –

- Megacles, Life Archon (922–892 BC)
- Diognetus, Life Archon (892–864 BC)
- Pherecles, Life Archon (864–845 BC)
- Ariphron, Life Archon (845–825 BC)
- Thespieus, Life Archon (824–797 BC)

- Sparta (complete list) –

Agiad dynasty
- Echestratus (c.900–870 BC)
- Labotas (c.870–840 BC)
- Doryssus (c.840–820 BC)
- Agesilaus I (c.820–790 BC)
Eurypontid dynasty
- Soos (890 BC)
- Eurypon (c.890–860 BC)
- Prytanis (c.860–830 BC)
- Polydectes (c.830–800 BC)
