= Marquis Ai =

Marquis Ai may refer to:

- Marquis Ai of Jin (died 709 BC)
- Marquis Ai of Cai (died 675 BC)
- Marquess Ai of Han (died 374 BC)
- Cao Chong (196–208), son of the warlord Cao Cao, posthumously honored as Marquis Ai of Deng

== See also ==
- Duke Ai (disambiguation)
