= Kingdom of Tyre =

Former country

- 2750 BC–332 BC
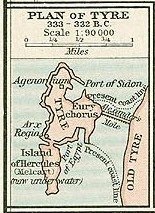
- The Kingdom of Tyre in 333 BC
- Capital: Tyre
- Common languages: Phoenician
- Religion: Canaanite religion
- Government: Monarchy
- History
  - Established: 2750 BC
  - Siege of Tyre: 332 BC

Area
- 677 BC: 1,000 km^{2} (390 sq mi)

Population
  - 500 BC estimate: 40,000
Succeeded by
Macedonian Empire
- Today part of: Lebanon, Israel

The Kingdom of Tyre was founded as a city-state in 2750 BC according to Herodotus, but the earliest mention of its monarchy comes from an Egyptian text from 1900 BC. It was formally annexed by Ahmose I in 1539 BC but retained its autonomy under vassalage, along with the neighbouring Kingdom of Sidon. Pharaonic Egypt eventually lost control and the two kingdoms became fully independent around 1076 BC. Later, it allied with the Kingdom of Israel under David and Solomon and provided cedar wood and workers to build the First Temple under Hiram I's orders. In the 9th century BC, it became the dominant Phoenician city-state, surpassing Sidon and Byblos, and establishing Mediterranean colonies like Carthage, whose people later became known as Punic.

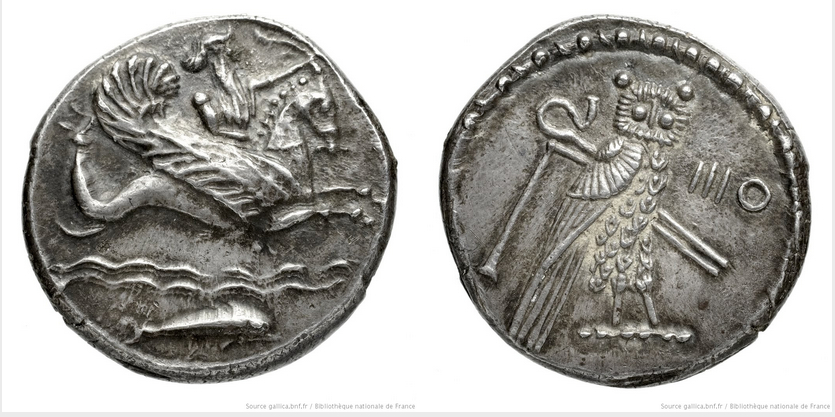
Kingdom of Tyre coin from 347 BC

The kingdom lost its independence in 876 BC when it was vassalized by the Neo-Assyrian Empire under Ashurnasirpal II. It later became vassal to the Babylonian Empire then the Persian Empire, and finally fell to Alexander the Great in 332 BC, with its autonomy abolished and its King Azemilcus allowed to ceremonially retain his throne. Most historians agree on this date as marking the end of the kingdom's history. At its territorial peak in the 9th century BC, it extended from Anfeh in the North to Mount Carmel in the South. In 677 BC, its territory extended from Sarepta in the North to Akko in the South. To the East, the Kingdom generally extended 15 km inland.

The city-state is mainly remembered for its production of Tyrian Purple. Starting in 450 BC, it minted its own coins. The list of Kings of Tyre is incomplete, mostly reconstituted from external sources in later centuries. From 573 BC to 558 BC, the monarchy was briefly replaced by a government of judges, before being reinstalled. From 539 BC to 332 BC, the kingdom was part of a Phoenician federal council based in Tripoli, along with the kingdoms of Sidon and Arwad, with each city-state having its tributary neighborhood in the capital.
