= Marquis Xi =

Marquis Xi may refer to:

- Marquis Xi of Jin (died 823 BC)
- Marquis Xi of Cai (died 761 BC)

== See also ==
- Marquis Li (disambiguation)
- Duke Xi (disambiguation)
