= Ji Xing =

Ji Xing is the name of:

- Marquis Gòng of Cai (died 760 BC)
- Duke Wen of Lu (Spring and Autumn period) (died 609 BC)
