= Ji Hu =

Ji Hu may refer to:

- Zhong Hu of Cai (fl. 11th–10th century BC)
- King Li of Zhou (died 828 BC)
- Jihu, a people who lived in northern China during the 7th century
