= Marquis Zhuang =

Marquis Zhuang may refer to:

- Marquis Zhuang of Cai (died 612 BC)
- Marquess Gong of Han (died 363 BC), also known as Marquis Zhuang

== Han dynasty and Three Kingdoms period ==
- Pang De (died 219), general under the warlord Cao Cao
- Wen Ping (died after 226), Cao Wei general
- Xu Huang (died 227), Cao Wei general
- Cao Xiu (died 228), Cao Wei general
- Xu Chu (died c. 230), Cao Wei general
- Zhang He (died 231), Cao Wei general
- Zhou Tai (Cao Wei) (died 261), Cao Wei general
