= Hiram IV =

Hiram IV (Phoenician Hi-ru-mu) was the Phoenician king of Tyre around 500 BC.

== Reign ==
The only narrative source about Hiram IV is the "Histories" of Herodotus, in which he is called Sirom. In his account of the generals who led the fleet of King Xerxes I of Persia during his campaign in Greece in 480 BC, Herodotus mentioned, among others, King Mattanus III of Tyre, son of Hiram.

Since Herodotus gave the name of the father of Mattanus III, and therefore he was quite well known even to the Greeks, it is assumed that Hiram IV was also a king like his son. Based on references to other rulers of Tyre of the VI—V centuries BC, the reign of Hiram IV dates back to about 500 BC. Probably, his predecessor on the throne of Tyre was King Ithobaal IV, but whether they were related is unknown. No details about the reign of Hiram IV are preserved in the sources. The next ruler of Tyre was King Mattan III.

== See also ==
King of Tyre
