= Siege of Tyre (332 BC) =

By the Macedonians under Alexander the Great

- Part of the Wars of Alexander the Great
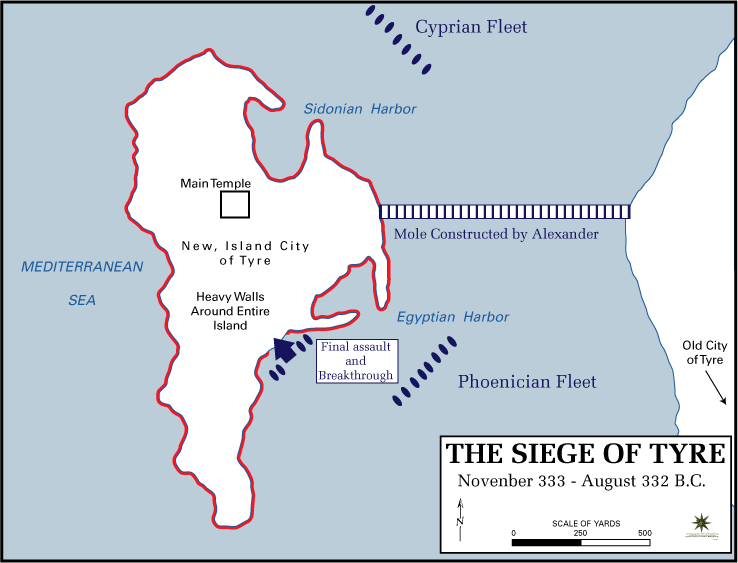
- Map of troop movements during Alexander's siege
Date	January–July 332 BC (6 months)
Location	Tyre, Phoenicia (modern-day Lebanon) 33°16′15″N 35°11′46″E
Result	Macedonian victory
Territorial changes	Macedonian army captures Tyre

Belligerents
Macedonian Empire; Hellenic League; Cyprus; Ionia; Phoenician city-states of Byblos, Arwad and Sidon	Kingdom of Tyre; Achaemenid Empire

Commanders and leaders
Alexander the Great	Azemilcus (surrendered)

Strength
120 ships-223 ships	80 ships

Casualties and losses
400 killed	6,000–7,000 killed in action 2,000 executed 13,000–30,000 civilians enslaved
- Location within Lebanon Location within Western Asia

Alexander the Great
current battle

The siege of Tyre was carried out by Alexander the Great in 332 BC during his campaigns against the Persians. At first, the Macedonian army was unable to capture the city of Tyre, which was a strategic coastal base on the Mediterranean Sea, through conventional means because it was on an island that was 1 kilometer off the coast of modern-day Lebanon (at the time Phoenicia) and had walls right up to the sea. Alexander responded by first blockading and besieging Tyre for seven months and building a causeway. When his soldiers discovered that they could not extend it any further due to a steep drop under the surface of the water, he ordered siege towers with catapults at the top to be moved to the end. This allowed him to breach the fortifications.

It is said that Alexander was so enraged by the Tyrians' fierce defence of the city and the loss of his men that he destroyed half the city. According to Arrian, 8,000 Tyrian civilians were massacred after the city fell. Alexander granted pardon to all who had sought sanctuary in the temple, including Azemilcus and his family, as well as many nobles. 30,000 residents and foreigners, mainly women and children, were sold into slavery.

== Location ==
Tyre, the largest and most important city-state of Phoenicia, was located both on the Mediterranean coast as well as a nearby island with two natural harbours on the landward side. The island lay about a kilometre from the coast in Alexander’s days, its high walls reaching 45.8 m (150 ft) above the sea on the eastern, landward-facing, side of the island.

The location of Tyre was ideal for the seafaring habits of the Phoenician people, but also proved to make it hard to attack. The matchup between Alexander the Great’s army and the forces of a Phoenician city-state might sound like an unfair fight, but Tyre’s logistics made for a long and grueling siege. Tyre’s split location between an island about half a mile off the coast of present-day Lebanon and the mainland makes it challenging to strategize against. The Tyrian people were also skilled fighters, and they used their surroundings to their advantage. The Tyrian navy was known as very disciplined and skilled at warfare on the sea, an area in which Alexander’s army was not as talented. Many ancient civilizations have set their eyes on Tyre. Perhaps they saw potential in the city; it could serve as an important naval base. Alexander the Great, a man praised for his military prowess, wanted to see if he could assert his dominance over the entire Mediterranean region before any other civilizations captured the city. Tyre was also a prosperous city, with a great deal of wealth among the population. Tyre was a crucial port city in the Mediterranean trade network, fostering the movement of goods, ideas, and people. Alexander the Great saw an opportunity to get involved in trade routes that would probably be beneficial to his people. Phoenician city-states at the time were not tightly bound to each other; they worked together but mostly existed independently. Alexander the Great would not have to worry so much about other parties getting involved in the conflict.

== Background ==
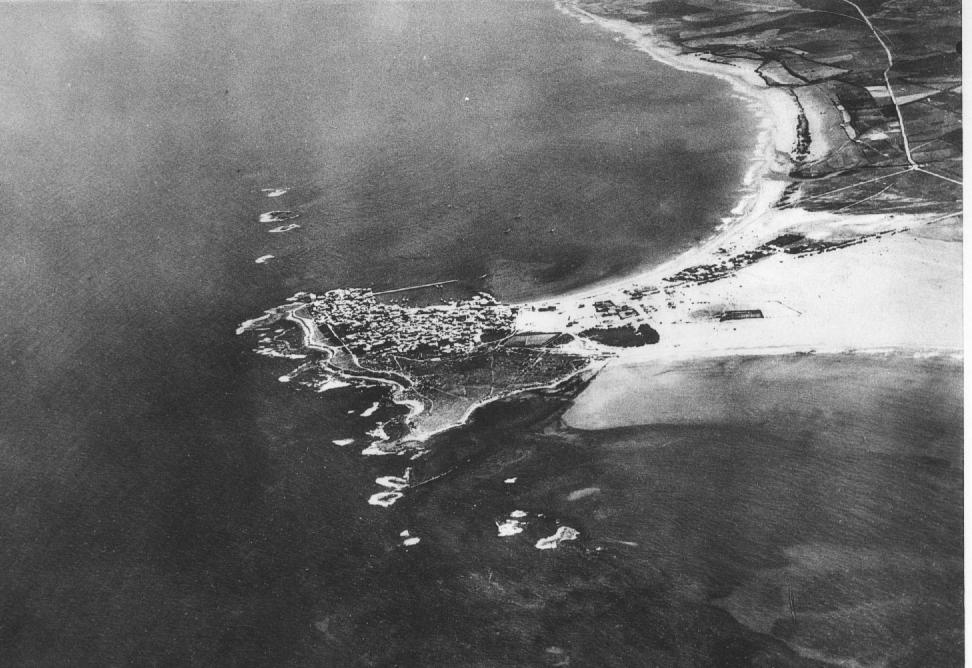
Tyre view from an airplane, 1934

At the time of the siege, the city held approximately 40,000 people, though the women and children had been evacuated to Carthage, the former Phoenician colony and then Mediterranean power. The Carthaginians also promised to send a fleet to their mother city’s aid. As Alexander did not have access to his own navy, he resolved to take the city and thus deny the Persians their last harbour in the region.

Alexander knew of a temple to Melqart, whom he identified with Heracles, within the new city walls and informed the inhabitants that they would be spared if he were allowed to make a sacrifice in the temple (the old port had been abandoned and the Tyrians were now living on an offshore island a kilometre from the mainland). The defenders refused to allow this and suggested he use the temple on the mainland, saying that they would not let Persians or Macedonians within their new city. A second attempt at negotiation resulted in Alexander's representatives being killed and then thrown from the walls into the sea. Alexander was enraged at the Tyrian defiance and ordered the siege to commence.

== Siege and naval warfare ==
As Alexander could not attack the city from the sea, he built a kilometre-long two hundred foot-wide causeway (claimed so by Diodorus) stretching out to the island on a natural land bridge no more than two meters deep.

This causeway allowed his artillery to get in range of the walls, and is still there to this day, as it was made of stone. As the work came near the city walls, however, the water became much deeper, and the combined attacks from the walls and Tyrian navy made construction nearly impossible. Therefore, Alexander constructed two towers 50 m (160 ft) high and moved them to the end of the causeway. Like most of Alexander’s siege towers, these were moving artillery platforms, with catapults on the top to clear defenders off the walls, and ballista below to hurl rocks at the wall and attacking ships. The towers were made of wood, but were covered in rawhide to protect them from fire arrows. Although these towers were possibly the largest of their kind ever made, the Tyrians quickly devised a counter-attack. They used an old horse transport ship, filling it with dried branches, pitch, sulphur, and various other combustibles. They then hung cauldrons of oil from the masts, so that they would fall onto the deck once the masts burned through. They also weighed down the back of the ship so that the front rose above the water. They then set the ship on fire and ran it up onto the causeway. The fire spread quickly, engulfing both towers and other siege equipment that had been brought up. The Tyrian ships swarmed the pier, destroying any siege equipment that hadn’t caught fire, and driving off Macedonian crews who were trying to put out the fires.

After this setback, Alexander was convinced that he would not be able to take Tyre without a navy. Fortunately for Alexander, his previous victory at Issus and subsequent conquests of the Phoenician city states of Byblos, Arwad and Sidon had meant that the fleets of these cities, which had composed most of the Persian navy, came under his banner. This immediately gave him command of a fleet of 80 ships. This development coincided also with the arrival of 120 war galleys sent by the king of Cyprus, who had heard of his victories and wished to join him. With the arrival of another 23 ships from the Greek city states of Ionia, Alexander had 223 galleys under his command, giving him command of the sea. Along with the navy he broadened the width of his mole to allow for more defensive engines to provide proper protection from the Tyrians.

With his new fleet, Alexander's forces sailed on Tyre and quickly blockaded both ports with its superior numbers. Alexander had several of the slower galleys and a few barges refitted with battering rams. Finding that large underwater blocks of stone kept the rams from reaching the walls, Alexander had them removed by crane ships. The rams were then anchored near the walls, but the Tyrians sent out ships and divers to cut the anchor cables. Alexander responded by replacing the cables with chains.

The Tyrians launched another counter-attack, but according to Arrian, were not so fortunate this time. The surprise attack went well initially. They noticed that Alexander returned to the mainland at the same time every afternoon for a meal and a rest along with much of his navy. The Tyrians were upon the engineers and builders on the mole before they had to time to react. They slaughtered many soldiers before they were held by the remaining sailors until backup arrived and the attack was pushed back. For some reason on this day, Alexander had skipped his afternoon nap, and sailed around the city to capture those of the attacking force that had made an attempt to retreat.

== Conclusion of the siege ==
Alexander started testing the wall at various points with his rams, until the rams made a small breach in the south end of the island. He then coordinated an attack across the breach with a bombardment from all sides by his navy. Alexander is said to have personally taken part in the attack on the city, fighting from the top of a siege tower. Once his troops forced their way into the city, they easily overtook the garrison, and quickly captured the city.

Those citizens who took shelter in the temple of Melqart were pardoned by Alexander, including the king of Tyre. According to Quintus Curtius Rufus 6,000 fighting men were killed within the city and 2,000 Tyrians were crucified on the beach. The others, some 30,000 people, were sold into slavery. The severity of reprisals reflected the length of the siege and Alexander's response to the Tyrians having executed some of his soldiers on the walls, in sight of the attackers.

Following the capture of Tyre, Alexander moved south to attack Gaza.

== Alternative conclusion ==
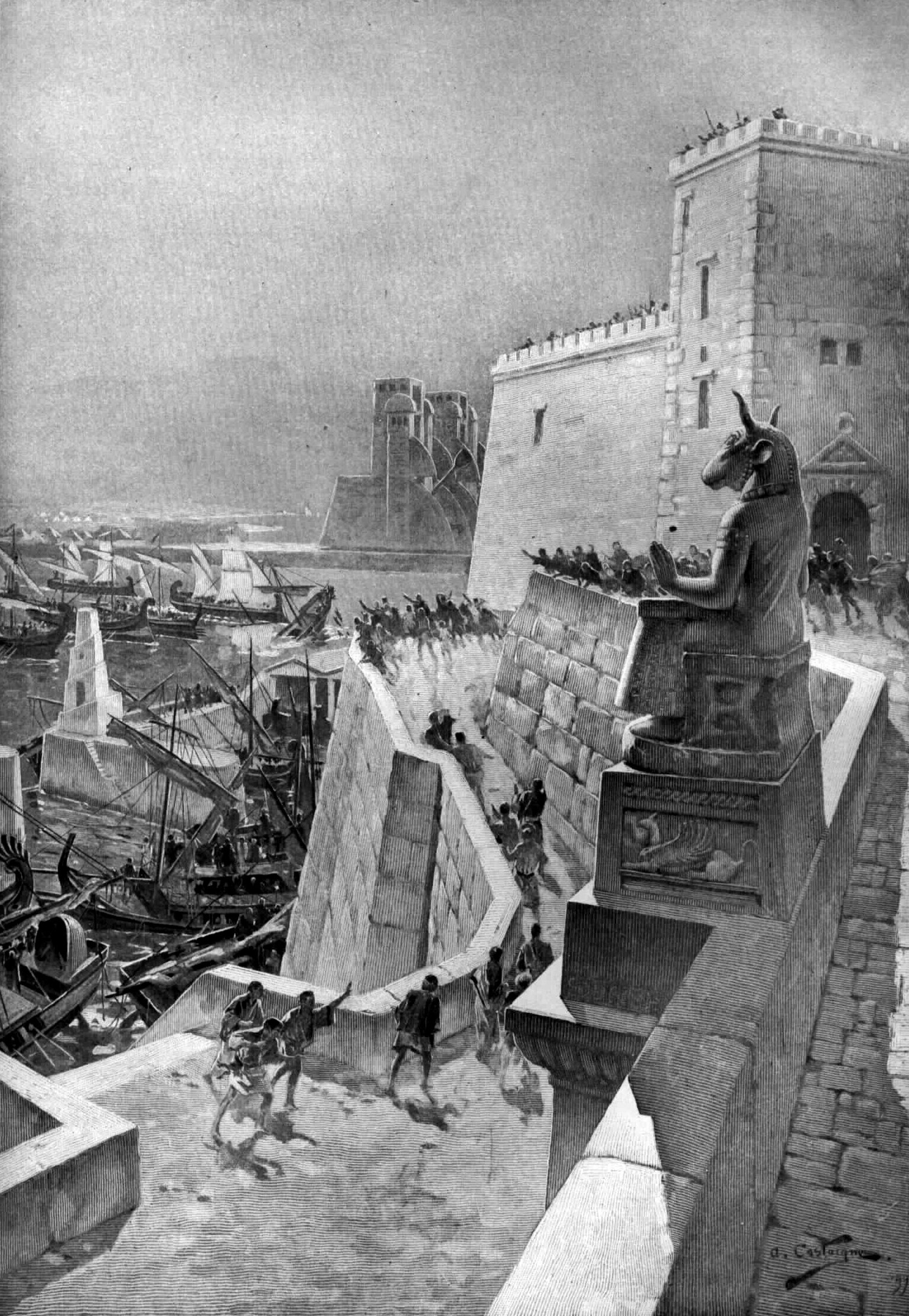
A naval action during Alexander the Great's siege of Tyre (332 BC). Drawing by André Castaigne, 1888–89.

Polyaenus the Macedonian, in one of the two stratagems he gives about Alexander's siege of Tyre, provides a different account of Alexander’s conquest of the city. According to him, Alexander had marched into Arabia having left Parmenion in charge of the besieging force. The Tyrians found the courage to exit their walls and engage the Greeks, often beating them in various skirmishes. Alexander was informed and hurried back, reaching the city exactly when the Tyrians were fighting against a retreating Parmenion. Instead of attacking the Tyrians, he chose to march directly to the city, which he immediately took by force surprising its remaining garrison. Another view presented by Polyaenus is that Alexander was so incensed at having to build a bridge to take the city of Tyre that he decided to kill or enslave most of Tyre's population.

== See also ==
- Admetus of Macedon
- List of Sieges of Tyre
- Diades of Pella
- Macedon

== Sources ==
- Wheeler, Benjamin Ide (April 1899). "The famous siege of Tyre: Alexander the Great: Sixth paper". The Century Magazine. 57 (6): 818–832.
- Jongeling, Hans, The Siege of Tyre by Alexander the Great in 332 B.C. (2008 Master Thesis). Archived from the original on 2011-08-05. Retrieved 2013-01-11.
