= Shu Du of Cai =

Zhou dynasty prince

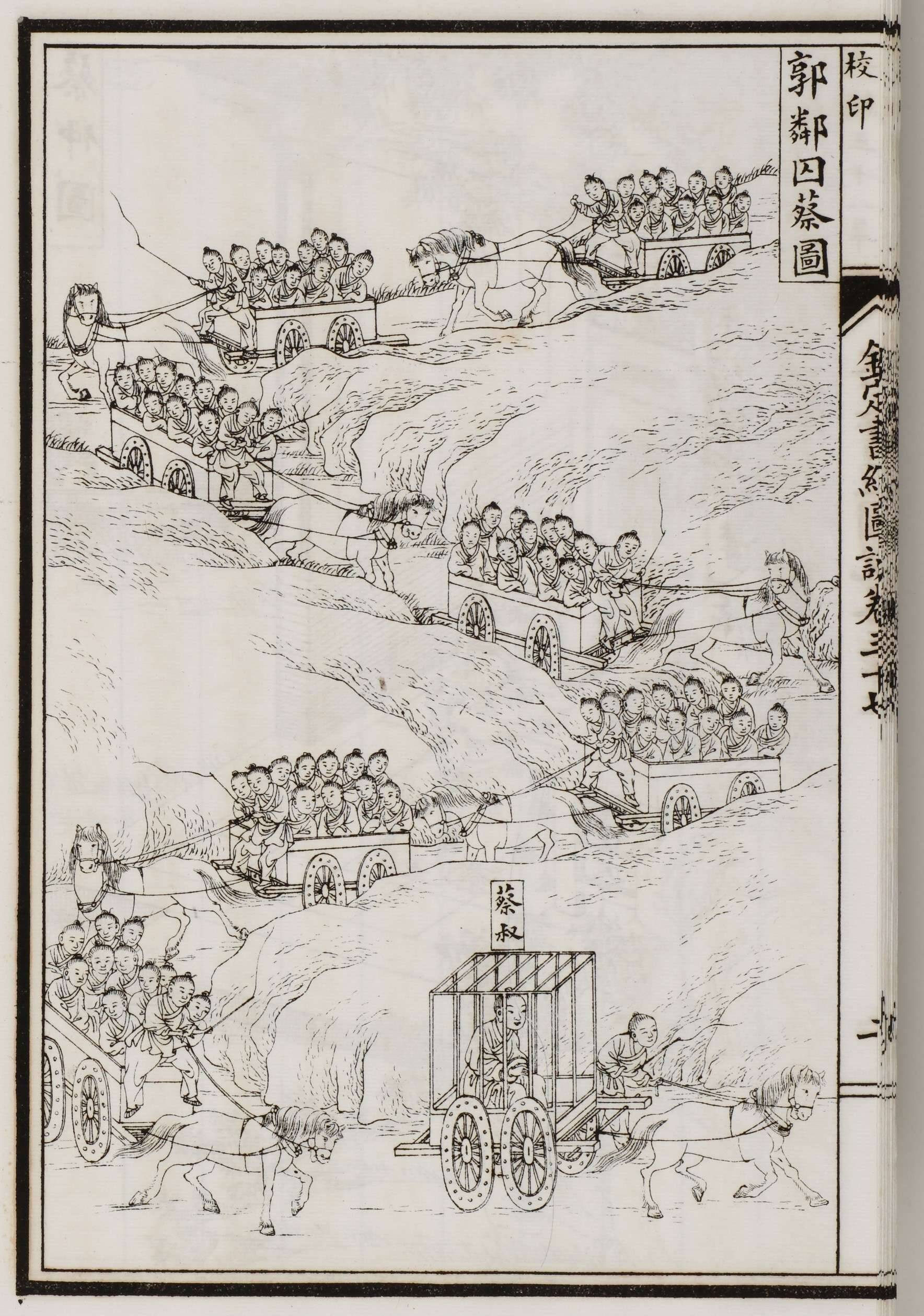
- Illustration of Duke Qin imprisoning the Ruler of Cai; from the Imperial Illustrated Edition of the Book of Documents.

Duke of the State of Cai
- Reign: 1046–1041 BC
- Predecessor: None
- Successor: Zhong Hu of Cai
Names
- Family name: Ji (姬); Given name: Du (度)
- House: Ji
- Father: King Wen of Zhou
- Mother: Tai Si
- Military career
- Allegiance: Yin
- Conflicts: Rebellion of the Three Guards (POW)

Shu Du of Cai (Chinese: 蔡叔度; lit. 'Du', '[Royal] Uncle of Cai'), given name Du (度), was the first ruler of the State of Cai.

== Early life ==
Shu Du was the fifth son of King Wen of Zhou and his wife Tai Si (太姒). He had ten brothers and eight half-brothers. His elder brothers were Bo Yikao, Ji Fa, Shu Xian, and Ji Dan.

== Reign ==
Shu Du was given the fief of Cai by King Wu after the overthrow of the last Shang king, Di Xin. Du's realm centred on present-day Shangcai, Henan, and the fief was aimed at controlling the heir to the Shang throne, Wu Geng, by restricting his access to eastern support from the Dongyi. He and his brothers Shu Xian of Guan and Shu Chu of Huo were known as the Three Guards, but when King Wu died and the Duke of Zhou assumed the regency for the young King Cheng of Zhou, they rebelled along with Wu Geng from the perspective of the Shang being entitled to the throne if King Wu had no heir. The Duke of Zhou was able to suppress the rebellion and Du was exiled, although Cheng eventually recreated the realm of Cai as a grant to Du's son Zhong Hu.

Shu Du of Cai House of Ji Cadet branch of the Royal House of Zhou
Regnal titles
New title	Ruler of Cai; 1046–1041 BC	Succeeded by Cai Zhong
