= Marquis Wu of Cai =

- Reign: 863–837 BC
- Issue: Yi of Cai
Names
- Family name: Ji (姬)
Posthumous name
- Wu (武)
- House: Ji
- Father: Marquess Lì of Cai (蔡厲侯)
- Mother: Marchessa of Cai (蔡侯妃)

Marquis Wu of Cai (蔡武侯; died 837 BC), birth name unknown, was the sixth ruler of the State of Cai from 863 BC to 837 BC during the Gonghe Regency. He was the only known son of Marquis Lì of Cai (蔡厲侯), his predecessor. His reign lasted for 28 years. He was succeeded by his son.

Marquis Wu of Cai House of Ji Cadet branch of the Royal House of Zhou 周朝宗室
Regnal titles
Preceded by Marquis Lì of Cai	Marquis of Cai (蔡國侯); 863–837 BC	Succeeded by Marquis Yi of Cai
