= Deleastartus =

- King of Tyre
- Reign: 900 – 889 BC
- Predecessor: Astartus (‘Ashtart) 920 – 901 BC
- Successor: Astarymus (Aserymus, ‘Astar-rom) 888 – 880 BC
- Born: 943 BC; Tyre, presumed
- Died: 889 or 888 BC
- Dynasty: “Dynasty of the four brothers”
- Father: unknown
- Mother: nurse of Abdastartus

Deleastartus (Dalay-‘Ashtart) was a king of Tyre and the second of four brothers who held the kingship. The information about him has been inferred from Frank M. Cross’s reconstruction of Josephus’s citation of the Phoenician author Menander of Ephesus, in Against Apion i.18. In the text as it now stands for the passage in Josephus/Menander, Astartus is the name and Deleastartus the patronymic of the second of the four brothers to receive the kingship, while the first brother, the one who killed Abdastartus to start the dynasty, is unnamed. Cross restores Astartus as the name of the first brother and posits the supposed patronymic as the name of the second. For a further explanation, see the Astarymus article. Cross’s reconstruction for these kings has been followed by William Barnes and is used in the present article.

== See also ==
- List of Kings of Tyre
- Astarymus
- Pygmalion of Tyre
