= Phelles =

- King of Tyre
- Reign: 879 BC (8 months)
- Predecessor: Astarymus (Aserymus, ‘Astar-rom) 888 – 880 BC
- Successor: Ithobaal I (’Ittoba‘l, Ethbaal)) 878 – 847 BC
- Born: 929 BC; Tyre, presumed
- Died: 879 or 878 BC
- Dynasty: Last of “dynasty of the four brothers”
- Father: unknown
- Mother: nurse of Abdastartus

Phelles was a King of Tyre and the last of four brothers who held the kingship. The only information available about Phelles comes from Josephus’s citation of the Phoenician author Menander of Ephesus, in Against Apion i.18. Here it is said that Phelles slew his brother Aserymus (Astarymus) and then “took the kingdom, and reigned but eight months, though he lived fifty years: he was slain by Ithobalus (Ithobaal I), the priest of Astarte.” He and the three preceding kings were brothers, sons of the nurse of Abdastartus, according to Menander.

The dates given here are according to the work of F. M. Cross and other scholars who take 825 BC as the date of Dido’s flight from her brother Pygmalion, after which she founded the city of Carthage in 814 BC. See the chronological justification for these dates in the Pygmalion of Tyre article.

== See also ==
- List of Kings of Tyre
- Pygmalion of Tyre
