= Astarymus =

- King of Tyre
- Reign: 888 – 880 BC
- Predecessor: Deleastartus (Dalay-‘Ashtart) 900 – 889 BC
- Successor: Phelles 879 BC
- Born: 934 BC; Tyre, presumed
- Died: 880 or 879 BC
- Dynasty: “Dynasty of the four brothers”
- Father: unknown
- Mother: nurse of Abdastartus

Astarymus (also called Aserymus; possibly Phoenician: 𐤏𐤔𐤕𐤓𐤓𐤌 ‘štrrm, "Ashtar is great") was a king of Tyre and the third of four brothers who held the kingship. The only information available about him comes from Josephus’s citation of the Phoenician author Menander of Ephesus, in Against Apion i.18. The entire passage about the four brothers is as follows, as given in Whiston’s translation:

Now four sons of (Abdastartus’s) nurse plotted against him and slew him, the eldest of whom reigned twelve years; after them came Astartus the son of Deleastartus: he lived fifty-four years, and reigned twelve years; after him came his brother Aserymus; he lived fifty-four years, and reigned nine years: he was slain by his brother Pheles, who took the kingdom and reigned but eight months, though he lived fifty years: he was slain by Ithobalus, the priest of Astarte.

The dates given for Astarymus (Aserymus) are according to the work of F. M. Cross and other scholars who take 825 BC as the date of Dido’s flight from her brother Pygmalion, after which she founded the city of Carthage in 814 BC. See the chronological justification for these dates in the Pygmalion of Tyre article.

In the Nora Stone article just cited, F. M. Cross makes the following observation:

Note that we presume a haplography in Josephan text between ‘Ashtart, the eldest brother of the four usurpers, and Dalay-‘ashtart his successor. In the present corrupt text Dalay-‘ashtart [Deleastartus] has been made the name of ‘Ashtart’s father: Astartos ho Delaiastarton. We do not expect the second brother’s patronymic [i.e., the ho Delaiastarton]. None are given for other usurpers or founders of new dynasties in the entire king-list.

Cross therefore presumed that “the son of Deleastartus” in this passage involved a corruption in which the name of the second of the four brothers was assimilated. William Barnes explains about Cross’s analysis:

His major contribution was the brilliant suggestion that the patronymic ho Delaiastartou of Codex Laurentianus . . . actually represents a corrupted form of the name of the second brother of the four usurpers . . . Indeed, it seems far more reasonable in my opinion to suggest such textual corruption (with the retention, albeit reinterpreted, of all the original names), than to have to explain why the name and chronological data of the eldest (and presumably most notorious) usurper are not lost, while the second usurper’s name, chronological data, and patronymic are extant.

Cross (and Barnes after him) therefore give the following sequence for the four sons of the nurse of Abdastartus:

- Astartus (‘Ashtart) 920-901 BC
- Deleastartus (Dalay-‘Ashtart) 900-889 BC
- Astarymus (‘Ashtar-rom, Aserymus) 888-880 BC
- Phelles 879 BC

The first of these four brothers, as given by Cross and Barnes, is not assigned any name in the usual interpretations of the texts, and Astartus is the second in the series. Cross restored Astartus as the first to reign and reconstructed the name of the second brother from what was previously presumed to be the patronymic of Astartus.

Regarding the 20 years assigned to Astartus, Barnes writes, “Cross’s suggested regnal total of 20 years for Astartos (the first usurper), while of necessity hypothetical, remains entirely possible given the strong textual support underlying Josephus’ own total of 155 years and eight months for the interval from the accession of Hiram to the founding of Carthage.”

== See also ==
- List of Kings of Tyre
- Pygmalion of Tyre
