= Baal-Eser I =

- King of Tyre
- Reign: 946 – 930 BC
- Predecessor: Hiram I 980 – 947 BC
- Successor: Abdastartus (‘Abd-‘Ashtart) 929 – 921 BC
- Born: 973 BC; Tyre, presumed
- Died: 930 or 929 BC
- Dynasty: Dynasty of Abibaal and Hiram I
- Father: Hiram I
- Mother: unknown

Baal-Eser I (Beleazarus I, Ba‘l-mazzer I) was a king of Tyre. His father, Hiram I, was a contemporary of David and Solomon, kings of Israel. The only information available about Baal-Eser I comes from the following citation of the Phoenician author Menander of Ephesus, in Josephus's Against Apion I.121:

Upon the death of Hirom, Beleazarus his son took the kingdom; he lived forty-three years, and reigned seven years: after him succeeded his son Abdastartus.

The dates for Baal-Eser are established from the dates for Hiram. The dating of Hiram and the following kings is based on the studies of J. Liver, J. M. Peñuela, F. M. Cross, and William H. Barnes, all of whom build on the inscriptional evidence of a synchronism between Baal-Eser II and Shalmaneser III in 841 BC. Earlier studies that did not take this inscriptional evidence into consideration will have differing dates for the kings of Tyre.

A further overview of the chronology of Tyrian kings from Hiram I to Pygmalion, with a discussion of the importance of Dido's flight from Tyre and eventual founding of Carthage for dating these kings, is found in the Pygmalion of Tyre article.

== See also ==
- List of Kings of Tyre
- Hiram I
- Pygmalion of Tyre for a discussion of date of founding of Carthage used by Menander
