= Huang, Earl of Cai =

- Reign: 11th or 10th century BC
- Spouse: Countess of Cai
Names
- Family name: Ji (姬); Given name: Huang (荒)
- House: Ji
- Father: Zhong Hu of Cai (蔡仲胡)

Huang, Earl of Cai (Chinese: 蔡伯荒; pinyin: Cài Bó Huāng), born Ji Huang (姬荒), was a noble from the Zhou dynasty of the third ruler of the ancient Chinese state of Cai.

Huang was the only known son of Zhong Hu of Cai and a second cousin of Kings Cheng and Kang of Zhou. His son inherited his land as Marquis Gōng of Cai, receiving the higher title, hou rather than bo.

== See also ==
- Shiji

Huang, Earl of Cai House of Ji Cadet branch of the Royal House of Zhou 周朝宗室
Regnal titles
Preceded by Cai Zhong	Ruler of Cai	Succeeded by Marquis Gong of Cai
