= Marquis Gōng of Cai =

4th ruler of Cai

- Reign: 10th century BC
- Issue: Lì of Cai
Names
- Given name: Huang (荒)
Posthumous name
- Gōng (宮)
- House: Ji
- Father: Huang, Earl of Cai (蔡伯荒)
- Mother: Countess of Cai

Marquis Gōng of Cai (Chinese: 蔡宮侯; pinyin: Cài Gōnghóu) (fl.10th century), nomen unknown, was the fourth ruler of the State of Cai. He was the only known son of Earl Huang of Cai (蔡伯荒) and close kin of King of Zhou. He was the first in the family to hold the title of the Marquis of Cai (Cai Guohou, 蔡国侯) which would be in use until the end of the State of Cai in 447 BC. He was succeeded by his son.

Marquis Gōng of Cai House of Ji Cadet branch of the Royal House of Zhou 周朝宗室
Regnal titles
Preceded by Earl Huang of Cai	Ruler of Cai	Succeeded by Marquis Li of Cai
