= Baal Lebanon inscription =

Phoenician inscription from the 8th century BC

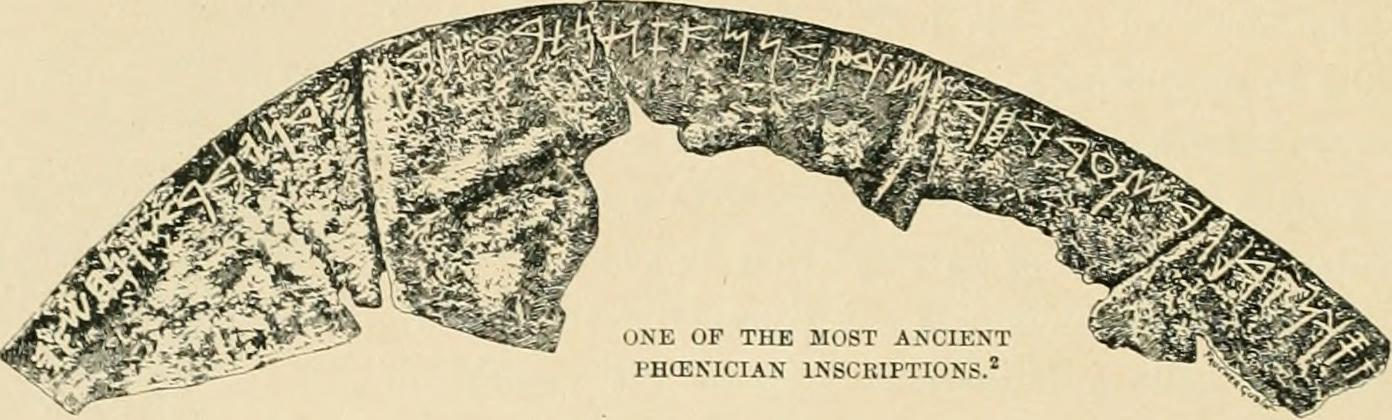
- The inscription
- Material: Bronze
- Writing: Phoenician
- Created: 8th century BCE
- Discovered: 1874-1875; Limassol, Limassol District, Cyprus
- Present location: Cabinet des Médailles, Paris

The Baal Lebanon inscription, known as KAI 31, is a Phoenician inscription found in Limassol, Cyprus in eight bronze fragments in the 1870s. At the time of their discovery, they were considered to be the second most important finds in Semitic palaeography after the Mesha stele.

It was purchased in 1874–75 by a Limassol merchant named Laniti from a scrap metal dealer, who did not know of their previous provenance. A copy was passed to Julius Euting, and after Charles Simon Clermont-Ganneau secured its acquisition by the Cabinet des Médailles, the inscription was published in full by Ernest Renan in 1877.

It is particularly notable for having mentioned Hiram II. It is the only Phoenician inscription to suggest a "colonial" system amongst the Phoenician domains.

== Fragments ==
Ernest Renan assigned each of the eight fragments of a letter to aid him in the reconstruction of the entire inscription: A, B, C, D, E, F, G, H. In his opinion, the reconstructed inscription was sequenced E, F, A, B, C, D – he could not find a place for fragments G and H. The fragments are transcribed as the following:

- A: [...]M MLK ṢDNM ʾZ YT[...] – "-am, king of Sidonians, has dedicat-"
- B: [...]N LBʿL LBNN – "-ed to Ba'al-Lebanon"
- C: ʾDNY – "his Lord"
- D: BRʾŠT NḤŠT Ḥ[...] – "good brass [...]"
- E: WSKN QRTḤ[...] – "And governor of Carth-"
- F: [...]DŠT ʿBD ḤR[...] – "-age, servant of Hir–"
- G: [...]ṬB SKN QRTḤDŠT ʾ(Z) – "[...]-tob, governor of Carthage, has [...]"
- H: (B)ʿL LBNN ʾDNY – "(Ba)'al-Lebanon, his Lord"

Therefore, per Renan's reckoning (E+F+A+B+C+D), the inscription reads, "...and governor of Carthage, servant of Hiram, king of Sidonians, has dedicated to Ba'al-Lebanon, his Lord, good brass...", with fragments G and H having no certain placement within the overall structure.

== Gallery ==
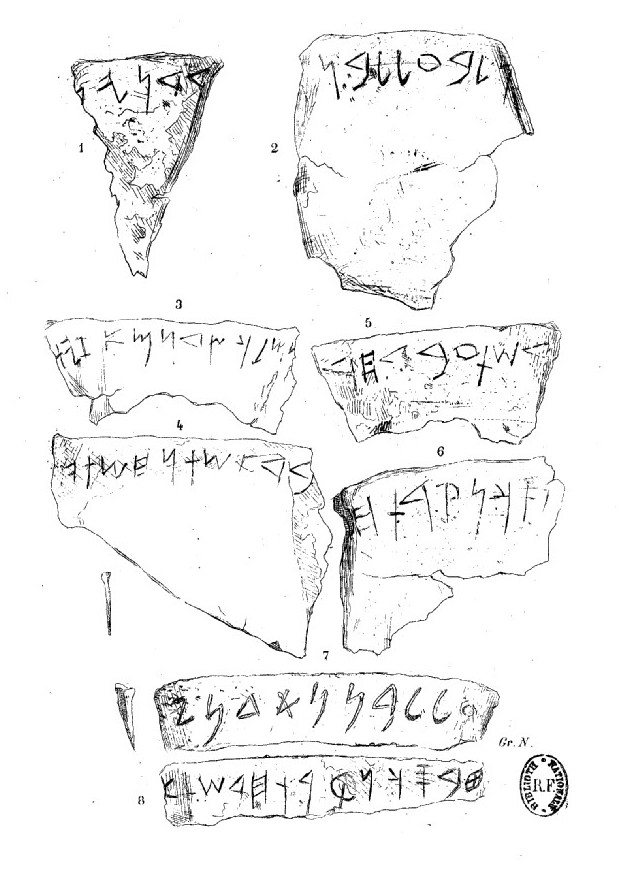
The fragments as first published by Renan

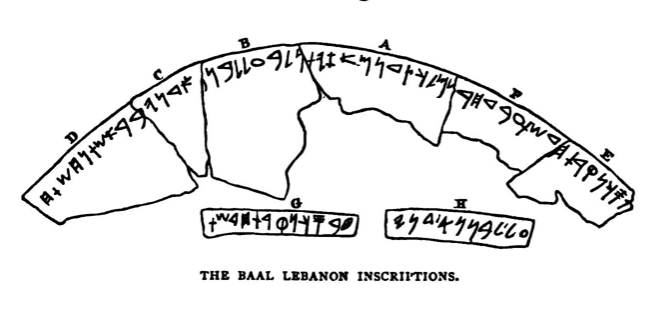
Reconstruction (with two pieces which do not fit)

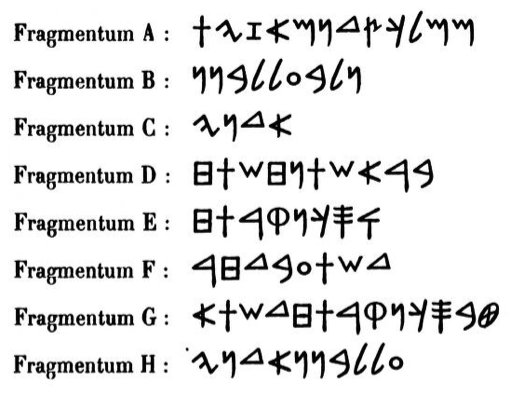
Transcription
