= Hiram II =

Phoenician King of Tyre

Hiram II (Hi-ru-mu) was the Phoenician king of Tyre from 737 to 729 BC. In 738 he was listed as a tributary of the Assyrian king Tiglath-Pileser III. His predecessor, Ithobaal II, was also stated to have paid tribute in that year. It is possible that the date in the Assyrian record is in error and Hiram's reign did not begin until 737. Hiram II should not be identified with the "Hiram, king of the Sidonians" who paid tribute to the Assyrians at an earlier date.

In 733 or 732, Hiram allied with Rezin, king of Damascus, but was attacked and defeated by Tiglath-Pileser. He was then deprived of Sidon, which the Assyrian king bestowed on Elulaios. Hiram also had agents on Cyprus, where his interests probably lay in the copper mines about Amathus and Limassol.

A letter of Qurdi-Aššur-lāmur to Tiglath-Pileser, quotes a report from the Assyrian functionary Nabū-šēzib at Tyre, wherein Nabū-šēzib claims to have prevented Hiram from seizing the sacred tree (ēqu) from Sidon: "Hiram cut down the [sacred] tree of the temple of his gods, which is at the entrance to Sidon, saying: ‘I shall move it to Tyre’. I made him stop this: the [sacred] tree, which he cut down, is at the foot of the mount."

According to the hypothesis that much of the material in the Hebrew Bible was written at a late date by a so-called "Deuteronomist", references to Hiram I's relations with Solomon, king of Israel, are often re-dated by scholars to the reign of Hiram II and the Judahite king Ahaz. Thus, the incident recorded in 1 Kings 5—where Hiram presented Solomon with cedar for his temple—may in fact reflect the renovation of the temple undertaken by Ahaz and recorded in 2 Kings 16. The Tyrian king would have needed Assyrian permission to fell trees on Mount Lebanon, but as Ahaz had recently paid a visit to Tiglath-Pileser at Damascus this permission could have been granted then. Likewise, the fleets assembled by Solomon and Hiram in 1 Kings 10 may better fit the reign of Ahaz. The Israelite king could have procured access to the sea at the Yarkon River from his overlord, Tiglath-Pileser, after the latter's conquest of Philistia. The gold of Ophir, which the fleets collected, was needed by both kings to cover their tribute to Assyria.

In 729, Mattan II deposed Hiram and seized the throne. In 728 he made a large payment of tribute to buy Assyrian recognition of his usurpation.
