= Admetus of Macedon =

Ancient Macedonian officer, served Alexander the Great

Admetus (Greek: Ἄδμητος) was a senior Macedonian military officer, the commander of the agema of the hypaspists under Alexander the Great, a man of great bodily strength. He was killed in the Siege of Tyre (332 BC). Following the defeat of a naval sortie by the Tyrians, Alexander tested the defences of the city from the sea. He employed vessels equipped with large, stone-shooting artillery, to attack at the city walls, aided by battering rams mounted on pairs of vessels lashed together. The southern walls were breached. After an initial assault was repulsed, the breach in the wall was widened, then the Macedonians, spearheaded by the hypaspitai under Admetus, gained a foothold. Admetus was killed, but Alexander took over, leading his men in clearing the breach of defenders. Reinforcements allowed Alexander's troops to pour into the city. Two thousand men of military age were crucified, while the survivors, 30,000 in number, were sold into slavery.

== Bibliography ==
- Green, P. (1992), Alexander of Macedon: 356–323 B.C. A Historical Biography, University of California Press. ISBN 0-520-07166-2
