= King Xi =

King Xi may refer to these ancient Chinese monarchs:

- King Xi of Zhou (died 677 BC)
- King Xi of Han (died 273 BC)

== See also ==
- Duke Xi (disambiguation)
