= Astartus =

- King of Tyre
- Reign: 920 – 901 BC
- Predecessor: Abdastartus (‘Abd-‘Ashtart) 929 – 921 BC
- Successor: Deleastartus (Dalay-‘Ashtart) 900-889 BC
- Born: unknown Tyre, presumed
- Died: 901 or 900 BC
- Dynasty: Started “dynasty of the four brothers”
- Father: unknown
- Mother: nurse of Abdastartus

Astartus was a king of Tyre and the first of four brothers who held the kingship. The information about him has been inferred from Frank M. Cross’s reconstruction of Josephus’s citation of the Phoenician author Menander of Ephesus, in Against Apion i.18. In the text as it now stands for the passage in Josephus/Menander, Astartus is the name and Deleastartus the patronymic of the second of the four brothers to receive the kingship, while the first brother, the one who killed Abdastartus to start the dynasty, is unnamed. Cross restores Astartus as the name of the first brother and posits the supposed patronymic as the name of the second. For a further explanation, see the Astarymus article. Cross’s reconstruction for these kings has been followed by William Barnes and is used in the present article.

A further overview of the chronology of Tyrian kings from Hiram I to Pygmalion, with a discussion of the importance of Dido’s flight from Tyre and eventual founding of Carthage for dating these kings, is found in the Pygmalion article.

Now four sons of (Abdastartus’s) nurse plotted against him and slew him, the eldest of whom reigned twelve years; after them came Astartus the son of Deleastartus: he lived fifty-four years, and reigned twelve years; after him came his brother Aserymus; he lived fifty-four years, and reigned nine years: he was slain by his brother Pheles, who took the kingdom and reigned but eight months, though he lived fifty years: he was slain by Ithobalus, the priest of Astarte.

== See also ==
- List of Kings of Tyre
- Astarymus
- Pygmalion of Tyre
