= Marquis Gòng of Cai =

Spring and Autumn period ruler in early 8 century BC

- Reign: 761–760 BC
- Issue: Dai of Cai
Names
- Family name: Ji (姬); Given name: Xīng (興)
Posthumous name
- Gòng (共)
- House: Ji
- Father: Marquess Lí of Cai (蔡釐侯)
- Mother: Marchessa of Cai (蔡侯妃)

Marquis Gòng of Cai (蔡共侯) (?–760 BC), born as Ji Xīng (姬興), was the ninth ruler of the State of Cai from 761 BC to 760 BC. He was the only known son of Marquis Yi of Cai (蔡夷侯), his predecessor. His reign only lasted for 2 years, which seem reasonable since his father's reign was 48 years making him an old man by the time he became Marquis. He was succeeded by his son.

Marquis Gòng of Cai House of Ji Cadet branch of the Royal House of Zhou 周朝宗室
Regnal titles
Preceded by Marquis Lí of Cai	Marquis of Cai (蔡國侯); 761–760 BC	Succeeded by Marquis Dai of Cai
