= Ithobaal II =

Phoenician king of Tyre, 8th century BC

Ithobaal II (also Itto-Baal, Ethobaal or Ethbaal, from Tuba'il) was an eighth-century BC Phoenician king of Tyre. Nothing is known of his reign except that he paid tribute to the Assyrian king Tiglath-pileser III in 738. He was succeeded that year or the next by Hiram II, who continued the tribute to the Assyrians.

The first-century historian Josephus provides the best surviving Tyrian king list. There is a gap in the sequence between about 773 BC and the reign of Ithobaal. It is possible therefore that Ithobaal's reign extended back several decades before he is recorded in an Assyrian tribute list for 738. Edward Lipiński suggests his reign began as early as c.760. Hayim Tadmor suggests that the Assyrian inscription recording Ithobaal's tribute should have the date amended to 740.
