= Duke Xi =

Duke Xi may refer to these ancient Chinese rulers:

- Duke Xi of Chen (died 796 BC)
- Duke Xi of Qi (died 698 BC)
- Duke Xi of Lu (died 627 BC)

== See also ==
- King Xi (disambiguation)
