= Zhong Hu of Cai =

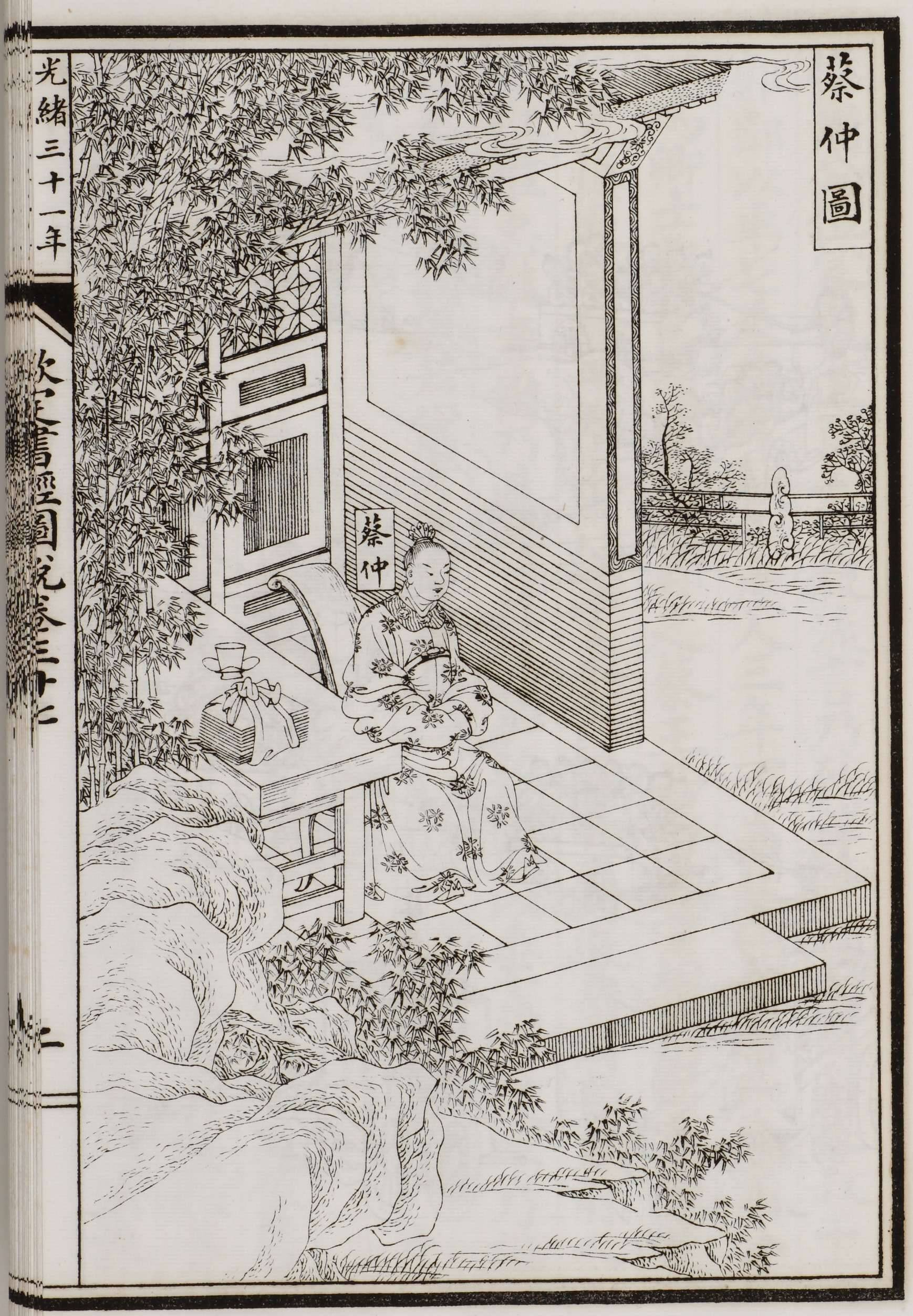
- Reign: 11th century BC – 11th or 10th century BC
Names
- Family name: Ji (姬); Given name: Hu (胡)
- House: Ji
- Father: Ji Du (姬度)

Cai Zhong Hu (Chinese: 蔡仲胡), born Ji Hu (姬胡), was the only known son of Ji Du, the first lord of Cai.

Ji Du was removed from his office after participating in the Rebellion of the Three Guards against the regency of the Duke of Zhou. However, his son made an effort to get his manners straight and be kind to people and was sent by the Duke of Zhou to Lu as an ambassador. Following this, King Cheng restored his father's fief to him and his son inherited it after him.

Zhong Hu of Cai House of Ji Cadet branch of the Royal House of Zhou 周朝宗室
Regnal titles
Preceded by Shu Du of Cai	Ruler of Cai	Succeeded by Earl Huang of Cai
