= Marquis Li of Cai =

Fifth ruler of the State of Cai (d. 863 BCE)

- Reign: 10th or 9th century – 863 BC
- Spouse: Countess of Cai
Names
- Family name: Ji (姬)
Posthumous name
- Lì (厲)
- House: Ji
- Father: Marquess Gōng of Cai (蔡宮侯)
- Mother: Marchioness of Cai (蔡侯妃)

Marquis Lì of Cai (蔡厲侯, died 863 BC), ancestral name Ji (姬), was the fifth ruler of the State of Cai. He was the only known son of Marquis Gōng of Cai. He was succeeded by his son Marquis Wu of Cai.

Marquis Li of Cai House of Ji Cadet branch of the Royal House of Zhou 周朝宗室
Regnal titles
| Preceded by Marquis Gōng of Cai | Marquis of Cai (蔡國侯) ?–863 BC | Succeeded by Marquis Wu of Cai |
