= Duke Li =

Duke Li may refer to these rulers of ancient China:

- Duke Li of Qi (died 816 BC)
- Duke Li of Chen (died 700 BC)
- Duke Li of Jin (died 573 BC)
