= Marquis Yi of Cai =

- Reign: 837–809 BC
- Issue: Ji Suo Shi
Names
- Family name: Ji (姬)
Posthumous name
- Yi (夷)
- House: Ji
- Father: Marquess Wu of Cai (蔡武侯)
- Mother: Marchessa of Cai (蔡侯妃)

Marquis Yi of Cai (蔡夷侯, died 809 BC), birth name unknown, was the seventh ruler of the State of Cai from 837 BC to 809 BC. He was the only known son of Marquis Wu of Cai (蔡武侯). His reign lasted for 28 years like his father's. He was succeeded by his son.

Marquis Yi of Cai House of Ji Cadet branch of the Royal House of Zhou 周朝宗室
Regnal titles
Preceded by Marquis Wu of Cai	Marquis of Cai; 837–809 BC	Succeeded by Marquis Xi of Cai
