= Shangcai County =

Shangcai County 上蔡县
- County
- Location of the seat in Henan
- Coordinates: 33°15′43″N 114°15′50″E
- Country: People's Republic of China
- Province: Henan
- Prefecture-level city: Zhumadian

Area
  - Total: 1,517 km^{2} (586 sq mi)

Population (2019)
  - Total: 975,100
  - Density: 642.8/km^{2} (1,665/sq mi)
- Time zone: UTC+8 (China Standard)
- Postal code: 463800

Shangcai County (simplified Chinese: 上蔡县; traditional Chinese: 上蔡縣; pinyin: Shàngcài Xiàn) is a county in the south of Henan province, China. It is under the administration of the prefecture-level city of Zhumadian.

In 2016 over 100 people were charged for a phone scam involving impersonating military personnel, with 'almost all of them holding a hukou from Shangcai County in Henan Province.' This led to increased anti-Henan sentiment.

== Administrative divisions ==
As of 2017, this county is divided to 4 subdistricts, 12 towns and 10 townships.

Subdistricts

- Caidu Subdistrict (蔡都街道)
- Lugang Subdistrict (芦岗街道)
- Chongyang Subdistrict (重阳街道)
- Wolong Subdistrict (卧龙街道)

Towns

- Huangbu (黄埠镇)
- Yangji (杨集镇)
- Zhuhu (洙湖镇)
- Dangdian (党店镇)
- Zhuli (朱里镇)
- Huapi (华陂镇)
- Taqiao (塔桥镇)
- Donghong (东洪镇)
- Shaodian (邵店镇)
- Wulong (五龙镇)
- Hedian (和店镇)
- Daluli (大路李镇)

Townships

- Wuliangsi Township (无量寺乡)
- Yangtun Township (杨屯乡)
- Caigou Township (蔡沟乡)
- Qihai Township (齐海乡)
- Chongli Township (崇礼乡)
- Hanzhai Township (韩寨乡)
- Dong’an Township (东岸乡)
- Xiaoyuesi Township (小岳寺乡)
- Xihong Township (西洪乡)
- Baichi Township (百尺乡)

== Climate ==
Climate data for Shangcai, elevation 53 m (174 ft), (1991–2020 normals, extremes 1981–present)
Month	Jan	Feb	Mar	Apr	May	Jun	Jul	Aug	Sep	Oct	Nov	Dec	Year
Record high °C (°F)	19.6 (67.3)	25.4 (77.7)	32.0 (89.6)	34.7 (94.5)	38.4 (101.1)	41.0 (105.8)	41.7 (107.1)	40.3 (104.5)	38.7 (101.7)	35.9 (96.6)	29.1 (84.4)	21.0 (69.8)	41.7 (107.1)
Mean daily maximum °C (°F)	6.3 (43.3)	9.9 (49.8)	15.1 (59.2)	21.6 (70.9)	27.2 (81.0)	31.8 (89.2)	32.2 (90.0)	30.8 (87.4)	27.3 (81.1)	22.3 (72.1)	14.9 (58.8)	8.5 (47.3)	20.7 (69.2)
Daily mean °C (°F)	1.3 (34.3)	4.4 (39.9)	9.6 (49.3)	15.7 (60.3)	21.2 (70.2)	25.9 (78.6)	27.5 (81.5)	26.0 (78.8)	21.7 (71.1)	16.4 (61.5)	9.5 (49.1)	3.5 (38.3)	15.2 (59.4)
Mean daily minimum °C (°F)	−2.6 (27.3)	0.0 (32.0)	4.8 (40.6)	10.2 (50.4)	15.8 (60.4)	20.7 (69.3)	23.6 (74.5)	22.4 (72.3)	17.4 (63.3)	11.8 (53.2)	5.1 (41.2)	−0.4 (31.3)	10.7 (51.3)
Record low °C (°F)	−15.5 (4.1)	−16.4 (2.5)	−7.8 (18.0)	−2.9 (26.8)	2.5 (36.5)	11.9 (53.4)	16.9 (62.4)	12.9 (55.2)	7.0 (44.6)	−0.5 (31.1)	−8.2 (17.2)	−11.8 (10.8)	−16.4 (2.5)
Average precipitation mm (inches)	18.8 (0.74)	21.8 (0.86)	39.6 (1.56)	46.2 (1.82)	74.0 (2.91)	118.9 (4.68)	188.5 (7.42)	128.6 (5.06)	73.2 (2.88)	52.1 (2.05)	39.2 (1.54)	16.6 (0.65)	817.5 (32.17)
Average precipitation days (≥ 0.1 mm)	5.3	5.7	6.6	6.4	8.7	8.1	11.1	10.6	8.9	6.7	6.4	4.7	89.2
Average snowy days	4.3	2.8	1.1	0	0	0	0	0	0	0	0.9	2.1	11.2
Average relative humidity (%)	70	70	70	71	70	69	81	84	79	71	72	69	73
Mean monthly sunshine hours	114.3	120.7	155.2	186.1	196.8	178.3	184.2	170.1	148.2	144.6	133.3	123.5	1,855.3
Percentage possible sunshine	36	39	42	48	46	42	42	42	40	42	43	40	42
Source: China Meteorological Administration

== See also ==
- Cai (state), an ancient state in that area
- Plasma Economy, blood donation scandal centered on Shangcai County
