= Duke Ai =

Duke Ai may refer to:

- Duke Ai of Qi (fl. 9th century BC), ruler of Qi during Western Zhou
- Duke Ai of Song (died 800 BC), ruler of Song during Western Zhou
- Duke Ai of Qin (died 501 BC), ruler of Qin during the Spring and Autumn period
