= Marquis Dai of Cai =

Dài of Cai 蔡戴侯
- Marquis of Cai

Marquis of the State of Cai
- Reign: 760–750 BC
- Predecessor: Marquis Gòng
- Successor: Marquis Xuan
- Issue: Ji Cuofu
Names
- Family name: Ji (姬)
Posthumous name
- Dai (戴)
- House: Ji
- Father: Marquis Gòng of Cai
- Mother: Marchessa of Cai (蔡侯妃)

Marquis Dai of Cai (Chinese: 蔡戴侯) (?–750 BC; his name is lost) was the tenth ruler of the State of Cai, from 760 BC to 750 BC. He was the only known son of his predecessor Marquis Gòng of Cai (蔡共侯). His reign lasted for 10 years. He was succeeded by his son.

Marquis Dai of Cai House of Ji Cadet branch of the Royal House of Zhou 周朝宗室
Regnal titles
Preceded by Marquis Gòng of Cai	Marquis of Cai (蔡國侯); 760–750 BC	Succeeded by Marquis Xuan of Cai
