= Marquis Xuan of Cai =

Ruler of the State of Cai

- Reign: 750–715 BC
- Spouse: Countess of Cai
- Issue: Jī Fēngrén
Names
- Family name: Ji (姬); Given name: Cuòfu (措父)
Posthumous name
- Xuan (宣)
- House: Ji
- Father: Marquess Dai of Cai (蔡戴侯)
- Mother: Marchessa of Cai (蔡侯妃)

Marquis Xuan of Cai (蔡宣侯, ?–715 BC), born Ji Cuòfu (姬措父), was the eleventh ruler of the State of Cai from 750 BC to 715 BC. He was the only known son of his predecessor Marquis Dai of Cai (蔡戴侯). He reigned for 35 years. He was succeeded by his son.

Marquis Xuan of Cai House of Ji Cadet branch of the Royal House of Zhou 周朝宗室
Regnal titles
Preceded by Marquis Dai of Cai	Marquis of Cai (蔡國侯); 750–715 BC	Succeeded by Marquis Huan of Cai
