= Marquis Mu of Cai =

14th ruler of the State of Cai from 675 BC to 646 BC

- Reign: 675–646 BC
- Issue: Jī Jiǎwǔ
Names
- Family name: Ji (姬); Given name: Xī (肸)
Posthumous name
- Mu (穆)
- House: Ji
- Father: Marquess Ai of Cai (蔡哀侯)
- Mother: Marchessa of Cai (蔡侯妃)

Marquis Mu of Cai (蔡穆侯, ?–646 BC), born Jī Xī (姫肸), was the fourteenth ruler of the State of Cai from 675 BC to 646 BC. He was the only known son of Marquess Ai of Cai (蔡哀侯), his predecessor. He reigned for 29 years. He was succeeded by his son.

== Sources ==
- Shiji
- Chinese Wikipedia
- Chinese Text Project
- chinaknowledge.de/History/Zhou/rulers-cai

Marquis Mu of Cai House of Ji Cadet branch of the Royal House of Zhou 周朝宗室
Regnal titles
Preceded by Marquis Ai of Cai	Marquis of Cai (蔡國侯); 675–646 BC	Succeeded by Marquis Zhuang of Cai
