= Abdastartus =

- King of Tyre
- Reign: 929 – 921 BC
- Predecessor: Baal-Eser I (Beleazarus I, Ba‘l-mazzer I) 946 – 930 BC
- Successor: Astartus (‘Ashtart) 920 – 901 BC
- Born: 950 BC; Tyre, presumed
- Died: 921 or 920 BC
- Dynasty: Dynasty of Abibaal and Hiram I
- Father: Baal-Eser I (Beleazarus I, Ba‘l-mazzer I)
- Mother: unknown

Abdastartus (Phoenician: 𐤏𐤁𐤃𐤏𐤔𐤕𐤓𐤕 ’bd’štrt, possibly pronounced akin to ’Abd-’Ashtart) was a king of Tyre, son of Baal-Eser I (Beleazarus) and grandson of Hiram I. The only information available about Abdastartus comes from the following citation of the Phoenician author Menander of Ephesus, in Josephus's Against Apion i.18:

Upon the death of Hirom, Beleazarus his son took the kingdom; he lived forty-three years, and reigned seven years: after him succeeded his son Abdastartus; he lived twenty-nine years, and reigned nine years. Now four sons of his nurse plotted against him and slew him.

Therefore, according to Menander/Josephus, Abdastartus began to reign seven years after the death of his grandfather, Hiram I. The dating of Hiram and the following kings is based on the studies of J. Liver, J. M. Peñuela, F. M. Cross, and William H. Barnes, all of whom build on the inscriptional evidence of a synchronism between Baal-Eser II and Shalmaneser III in 841 BC. Earlier studies that did not take this inscriptional evidence into consideration will have differing dates for the kings of Tyre.

== See also ==
- List of Kings of Tyre
