= Marquis Zhuang of Cai =

Lord Zhuang of Cai 蔡莊侯

Ruler of Cai
- Reign: 645–612 BC
- Predecessor: Lord Mu of Cai
- Successor: Lord Wen of Cai
- Died: 612 BC
- Issue: Lord Wen of Cai
Names
- Ancestral clan (姓): Jī (姬); Given name: Jiǎwǔ (甲午)
Posthumous name
- Zhuang (莊)
- Father: Lord Mu of Cai

Marquis Zhuang of Cai (蔡莊侯, d. 612 BC), born Jī Jiǎwǔ (姫甲午), was the fifteenth ruler of the State of Cai from 645 BC to 612 BC. He was the only known son of Lord Mu of Cai (蔡穆侯), his predecessor. His reign was a period of 34 years. He was succeeded by his son.

Marquis Zhuang of Cai House of Ji Cadet branch of the Royal House of Zhou 周朝宗室
Regnal titles
Preceded by Marquis Mu of Cai	Marquis of Cai (蔡國侯); 645–612 BC	Succeeded by Marquis Wen of Cai
