= Azemilcus =

4th-century BC Phoenician king of Tyre

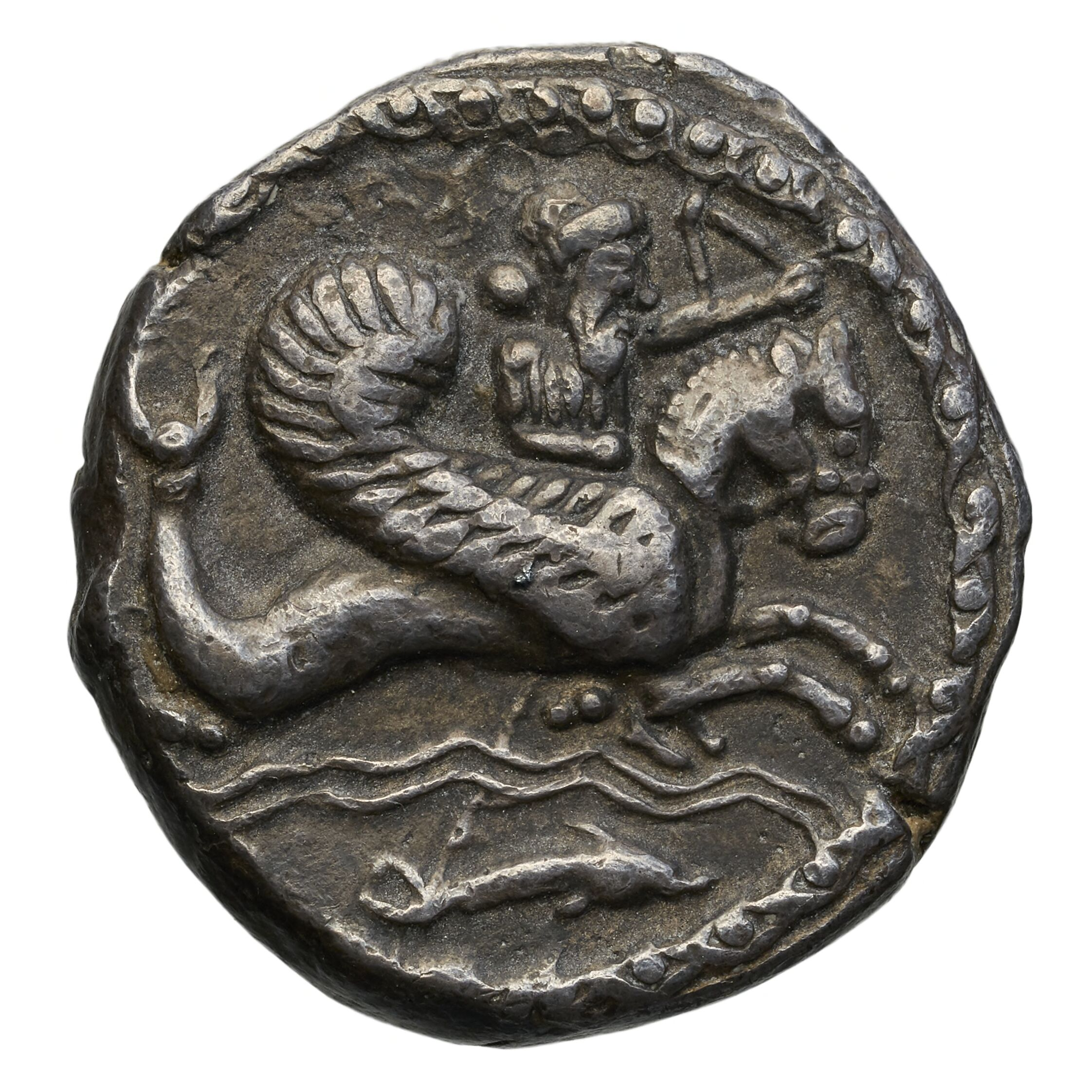
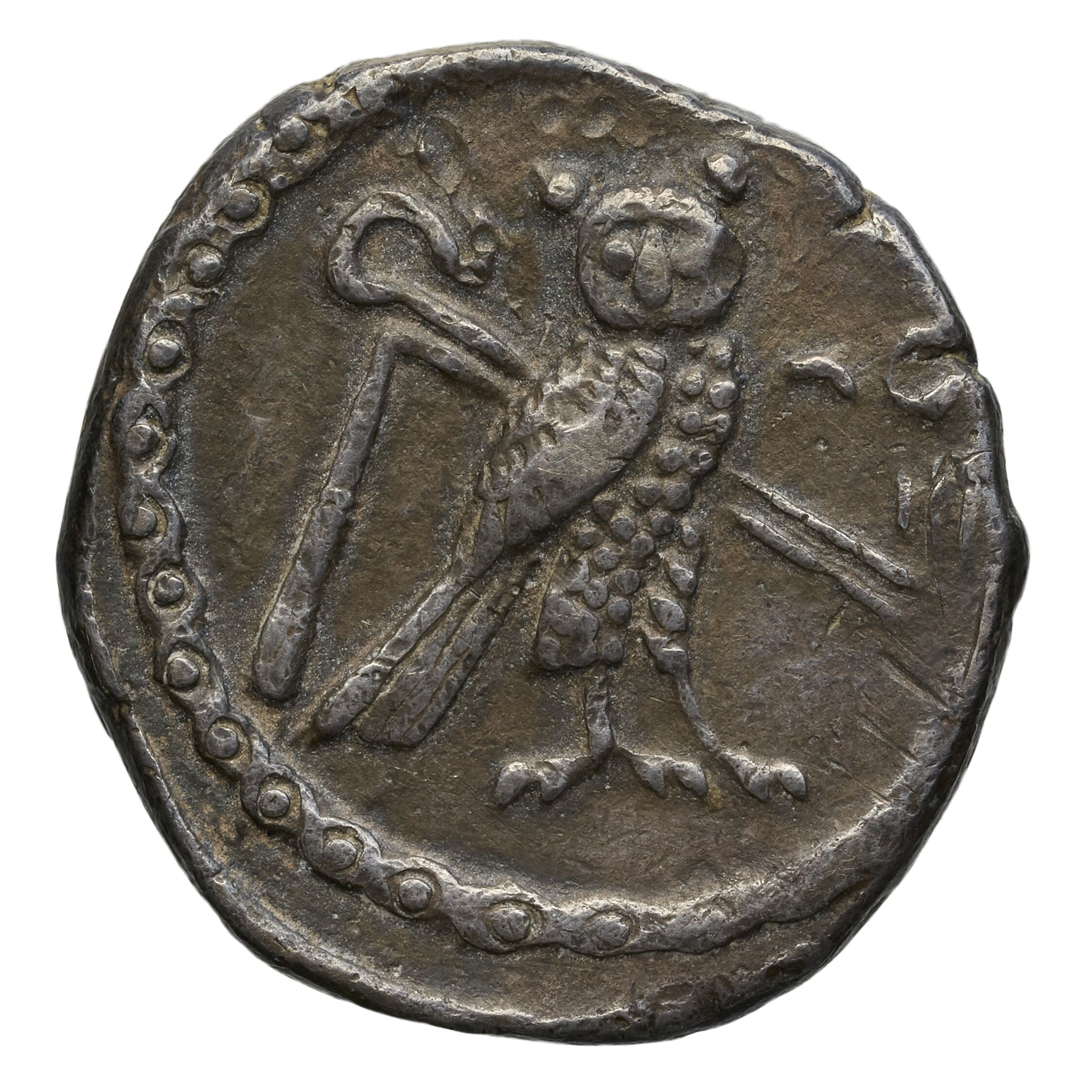
Silver coin of Azemilcus: Melqart, riding a hippocamp over the sea, draws his bow, accompanied by a dolphin under the exergue waves; on the reverse, owl with crook and flail.

Azemilcus ('zmlk\) (Ancient Greek: Ἀζέμιλκος) was the King of Tyre during its siege by Alexander the Great in 332 BC.

Alexander had already peacefully taken Byblos and Sidon, and Tyre sent envoys to Alexander agreeing to do his bidding. His response was to declare that he wished to enter the city to sacrifice to Melqart, known to Alexander as the Tyrian Herakles. Azemilcus was with the Persian fleet at the time, and the Tyrians, unsure who would win the war, responded by saying that they would obey any other command but that neither Persians nor Macedonians could enter the city. When Alexander finally captured Tyre, he granted clemency to Azemilcus, the magistrates, and the members of the Carthaginian delegation who had taken refuge in the temple of Melqart. Alexander left Azemilcus on the throne of a Tyre subordinate to Macedon.

Azemilcus is mostly known by his coins, small 18mm silver staters or shekels (terminology varies) featuring Melqart riding a hippocamp over the waves on one side and an owl with crook and the Phoenician letter Ayin for Azemilcus surrounded by a series of Phoenician numbers indicating the year of his reign. These coins were minted for at least 15 years (347–332 BC) and are some of the earliest dated ancient coins that can be ascribed to a particular ruler.
