= Marquis Huan of Cai =

- Reign: 715–695 BC
- Issue: Jī Xiànwǔ
Names
- Family name: Ji (姬); Given name: Fēngrén (封人)
Posthumous name
- Huan (桓)
- House: Ji
- Father: Marquess Xuan of Cai (蔡宣侯)
- Mother: Marchessa of Cai (蔡侯妃)

Marquis Huan of Cai (蔡桓侯, ?–695 BC), born Jī Fēngrén (姫封人), was the twelfth ruler of the State of Cai, from 715 BC to 695 BC. He was the only known son of his predecessor Marquis Xuan of Cai (蔡宣侯). His reign was a period of 20 years. He was succeeded by his son.

== Sources ==
- Shiji
- Chinese Wikipedia
- "Chinese Text Project". ctext.org.
- Theobald, Ulrich. "The Regional State of Cai 蔡". www.chinaknowledge.de. Ulrich Theobald.

Marquis Huan of Cai House of Ji Cadet branch of the Royal House of Zhou 周朝宗室
Regnal titles
Preceded by Marquis Xuan of Cai	Marquis of Cai (蔡國侯); 715–695 BC	Succeeded by Marquis Ai of Cai
