= Cai (state) =

Chinese state (1046–447 BCE)

Cai 蔡
- c. 1045 bce–447 bce
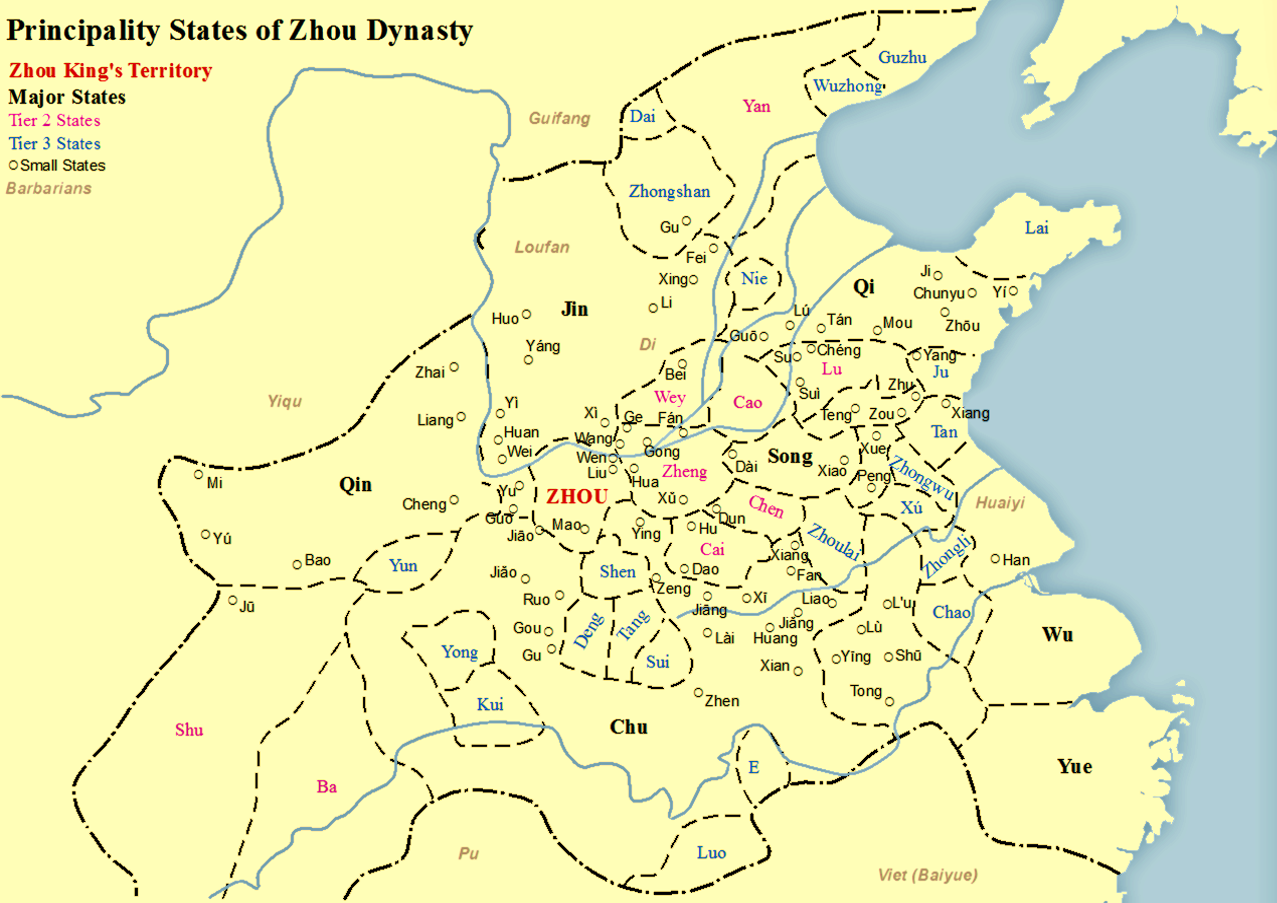
- Cai is in the central plain, near Chu, Chen and Zheng
- Status: County (伯國) → March (侯國)
- Capital: Shàngcài (上蔡); Xīncài (新蔡); Xiàcài (下蔡)
- Government: Monarchy
- Lord
  - 1046 BC – ?: Cai Shu Du
  - ?–?: Ji Hu
  - ?–?: Huang
  - ?–?: Gōng
  - ?–863 BC: Li
  - 863–837 BC: Wu
  - 837–809 BC: Yi
  - 809–761 BC: Xi
  - 761–760 BC: Gòng
  - 760–750 BC: Dai
  - 750–715 BC: Xuan
  - 715–695 BC: Huan
  - 695–675 BC: Ai
  - 675–646 BC: Mu
  - 645–612 BC: Zhuang
- Historical era: Zhou dynasty
  - Established: c. 1045 bce
  - Rebellion of the Three Guards: c. 1042–1039 BC
  - Conquered by Chu: 447 bce
Succeeded by
Chu (state)

Cai
- Chinese: 蔡
Transcriptions
Standard Mandarin
- Hanyu Pinyin: Cài
- Gwoyeu Romatzyh: Tsay
- Wade–Giles: Ts'ai^{4}
- IPA: [tsʰâɪ]
Yue: Cantonese
- Yale Romanization: Choi
- Jyutping: Coi^{3}
Southern Min
- Tâi-lô: Tshuà
Middle Chinese
- Middle Chinese: ts^{h}àj
Old Chinese
- Baxter–Sagart (2014): *s.r̥ˤat-s

Chinese states, 5th century BCE

Cai (Chinese: 蔡; pinyin: Cài; Wade–Giles: Ts'ai^{⁴}; Old Chinese: *s.r̥ˤat-s) was an ancient Chinese state established at the beginning of the Zhou dynasty, rising to prominence during the Spring and Autumn period, and destroyed early in the Warring States period.

== History ==
Following his overthrow of the Shang king Zhou, King Wu of Zhou granted titles and territories to his younger brothers. The fifth brother, Cai Shu Du, was enfeoffed at present-day Shangcai (lit. "Upper Cai") in Henan. During the Three Guards Rebellion, he attempted to usurp the Duke of Zhou's position as regent to the young king and his defeat meant his deposition and exile.

Du's son Ji Hu, however, proved a loyal and capable ambassador for Cheng and the Duke of Zhou, and they rewarded him with the reestablishment of his father's territory and title, which he was able to pass on to his son, Ji Huang.

As the Chinese peerage developed, Cai was initially considered a county and then elevated to a march; it was never able, however, to become a duchy or kingdom in its own right. Invasions from Chu during the Spring and Autumn period relocated Cai several times, first to Xincai (lit. "New Cai") in 531 BC and later to Xiacai (lit. "Lower Cai") at present-day Fengtai in Anhui. In 447 BC, King Hui of Chu conquered Cai completely, but allowed the marquesses to settle near Changde in Hunan and establish a rump state called Gaocai (lit. "Tall Cai"). This was destroyed 80 years later.

== Legacy ==
With the spread of surnames to all Chinese during the Qin dynasty, many people from the former state took the surname Cai in memory of their former home.

These former subjects have undertaken two major migrations. During the Huang Chao Rebellion against the Tang in AD 875, the Cai clan moved to Guangdong and Fujian. A later migration occurred when the Ming loyalist Koxinga relocated many Cai officers to Taiwan in the 17th century.

== Rulers of Cai ==
The rulers of Cai were all descended from the Zhou imperial Ji family and – after the first three – held the rank of Hou (translated as "Marquis").

1. Shu Du of Cai
2. Zhong Hu of Cai
3. Earl Huang of Cai
4. Marquis Gōng of Cai (蔡宮侯, Cài Gōnghóu)
5. Marquis Li of Cai (蔡厲侯, Cài Lìhóu)
6. Marquis Wu of Cai (蔡武侯, Cài Wǔhóu; 863–837 BC)
7. Marquis Yi of Cai (蔡夷侯, Cài Yíhóu; 837–809 BC)
8. Marquis Xi of Cai (蔡釐侯, Cài Xihóu; 809–761 BC)
9. Marquis Gòng of Cai (蔡共侯, Cài Gònghóu; 761–760 BC)
10. Marquis Dai of Cai (蔡戴侯, Cài Dàihóu; 759–750 BC)
11. Marquis Xuan of Cai (蔡宣侯, Cài Xuānhóu; 749–715 BC)
12. Marquis Huan of Cai (蔡桓侯, Cài Huánhóu; né 姬封人, Jī Fēngrén; 714–695 BC)
13. Marquis Ai of Cai (蔡哀侯, Cài Āihóu; né 姬獻舞, Jī Xiànwǔ; 694–675 BC)
14. Marquis Mu of Cai (蔡穆侯, Cài Mùhóu; né 姬肸, Jī Xì; 674–646 BC)
15. Marquis Zhuang of Cai (蔡莊侯, Cài Zhuānghóu; né 姬甲午, Jī Jiǎwǔ; 645–612 BC)
16. Marquis Wen of Cai (蔡文侯, Cài Wénhóu; né 姬申, Jī Shēn; 611–592 BC)
17. Marquis Jing of Cai (蔡景侯, Cài Jǐnghóu; né 姬固, Jī Gù; 591–543 BC)
18. Marquis Ling of Cai (蔡靈侯, Cài Línghóu; né 姬般, Jī Bān; 542–531 BC)
19. Marquis Ping of Cai (蔡平侯, Cài Pínghóu; né 姬廬, Jī Lú; 530–522 BC)
20. Marquis Dao of Cai (蔡悼侯, Cài Dàohóu; né 姬東國, Jī Dōngguó; 521–519 BC)
21. Marquis Zhao of Cai (蔡昭侯, Cài Zhāohóu; né 姬申, Jī Shēn; 518–491 BC)
22. Marquis Cheng of Cai (蔡成侯, Cài Chénghóu; né 姬朔, Jī Shuò; 490–472 BC)
23. Marquis Sheng of Cai (蔡聲侯, Cài Shēnghóu; né 姬産, Jī Chuǎn; 471–457 BC)
24. Marquis Yuan of Cai (蔡元侯, Cài Yuánhóu; 456–451 BC)
25. Marquis Qi of Cai (蔡齊侯, Cài Hóuqí; né 姬齊, Jī Qí; 450–447 BC)

== Rulers family tree ==
Cai state rulers

Shu Du of Cai 蔡叔度; Ruler of Cai; 1046 BC – ?
Ji Hu 姬胡; Zhong Hu of Cai 蔡仲; Ruler of Cai
Ji Huang 姬荒; Earl Huang of Cai 蔡伯荒; Ruler of Cai
Marquis Gōng of Cai 蔡宫侯; Ruler of Cai
Marquis Li of Cai 蔡厉侯; Ruler of Cai ?–863 BC
Wu of Cai 蔡武侯; Marquis of Cai ?–864–838 BC
Yi of Cai 蔡夷侯; Marquis of Cai ?–838–810 BC
Ji Suǒshi 姬所事; Xi of Cai 蔡僖侯; Marquis of Cai ?–810–762 BC
Ji Xīng 姬興; Gòng of Cai 蔡共侯; Marquis of Cai ?–762–760 BC
Dai of Cai 蔡戴侯; Marquis of Cai ?–760–750 BC
Ji Cuòfu 姬措父; Xuan of Cai 蔡宣侯; Marquis of Cai ?–750–715 BC
Jī Fēngrén 姫封人; Huan of Cai 蔡桓侯; Marquis of Cai ?–715–695 BC	Jī Xiànwǔ 姫獻舞; Ai of Cai 蔡哀侯; Marquis of Cai ?–695–675 BC
Jī Xì 姬肸; Mu of Cai 蔡穆侯; Marquis of Cai ?–675–646 BC
Jī Jiǎwǔ 姬甲午; Zhuang of Cai 蔡庄侯; Marquis of Cai ?–646–612 BC
Jī Shēn 姬申; Wen of Cai 蔡文侯; Marquis of Cai ?–612–592 BC	Ducal Son; Prince Xiè 公子燮 ?–553 BC	Ducal Son; Prince Lǚ 公子履
Jī Gù 姬固; Jing of Cai 蔡景侯; Marquis of Cai ?–592–543 BC
Jī Bān 姬般; Ling of Cai 蔡灵侯; Marquis of Cai ?–543–531 BC
隐太子 ?–530 BC
Jī Lú 姬廬; Ping of Cai 蔡平侯; Marquis of Cai ?–530–522 BC	Jī Dōngguó 姬東國; Dao of Cai 蔡悼侯; Marquis of Cai ?–522–519 BC	Jī Shēn 姬申; Zhao of Cai 蔡昭侯; Marquis of Cai ?–519–491 BC
Marquis Zhū of Cai 蔡侯朱; Marquis of Cai ?–522–? BC	Jī Shuò 姬朔; Cheng of Cai 蔡成侯; Marquis of Cai ?–491–472 BC	Yuán 元	Gān 乾
Jī Chuǎn 姬産; Sheng of Cai 蔡声侯; Marquis of Cai ?–472–457 BC
Yuan of Cai 蔡元侯; Marquis of Cai ?–457–451 BC
Jī Qí 姬齊; Qi of Cai 蔡侯齐; Marquis of Cai ?–451–447 BC

== See also ==
- Shangcai County
