= Marquis Ai of Cai =

- Reign: 695–675 BC
- Issue: Jī Xì
Names
- Family name: Ji (姬); Given name: Xianwu (獻舞)
Posthumous name
- Ai (哀)
- House: Ji
- Father: Marquess Huan of Cai (蔡桓侯)
- Mother: Marchessa of Cai (蔡侯妃)

Marquis Ai of Cai (蔡哀侯, died 675 BC), born Jī Xiànwǔ (姫獻舞), was the thirteenth ruler of the State of Cai from 695 BC to 675 BC. He was the only known son of Marquis Huan of Cai (蔡桓侯), his predecessor. His reign was a period of 20 years. In the autumn of 684 BC, King Wen of Chu conquered the State of Cai and took the reigning Marquis as a prisoner of war. But King Wen of Chu restored the state after Marquis Ai praised Madam Xī (息妫). He was succeeded by his son.

Marquis Ai of Cai House of Ji Cadet branch of the Royal House of Zhou 周朝宗室
Regnal titles
Preceded by Marquis Huan of Cai	Marquis of Cai (蔡國侯); 695–675 BC	Succeeded by Marquis Mu of Cai
