= Marquis Xi of Cai =

Son of Marquis Yi of Cai

Xi of Cai 蔡釐侯
- Marquis of Cai

Marquis of the State of Cai
- Reign: 809–761 BC
- Predecessor: Marquis Yi
- Successor: Marquis Gòng
- Died: 761 BC
- Issue: Ji Xing
Names
- Family name: Ji (姬); Given name: Suǒshi (所事)
Posthumous name
- Xi (釐)
- House: Ji
- Father: Marquis Yi of Cai

Marquis Xi of Cai (蔡釐侯) (died 761 BC), given name Suǒshi (所事), was the eighth ruler of the State of Cai from 809 to 761 BC. He was the only known son of Marquis Yi of Cai, his predecessor. His reign lasted for 48 years, the longest reign in Cai history. He was succeeded by his son.

Marquis Xi of Cai House of Ji Cadet branch of the Royal House of Zhou 周朝宗室
Regnal titles
Preceded by Marquis Yi of Cai	Marquis of Cai 蔡國侯; 809–761 BC	Succeeded by Marquis Gòng of Cai
