= Luli =

Phoenician king of Tyre (729–694 BC)

Elulaios
- King of Tyre
- Reign: 729–694 BC

Luli or Elulaios was king of the Phoenician city of Tyre (729–694 BC). During his reign, Tyre lost what remained of its power to Assyria.

The reign of Luli is characterized by several wars with Assyria. Tyre was tributary to Assyria, but Luli revolted against the Assyrians more than once. From 724 to 720 BC, Tyre was under siege, the port being blockaded by Shalmaneser. During the reign of Sargon, the Assyrians had occupied Cyprus, but following Sargon's death in 705, Luli reclaimed the island and its colony of Kition. In 701, after another revolt, Sennacherib forced Luli to flee to Kition. Tyre lost control over Sidon and Akko, being reduced to the city itself and its overseas colonies. After Luli's death, the kingdom of Tyre was ruled by a series of pro-Assyrian monarchs and governors.

== See also ==
- List of Kings of Tyre
