= Abibaal =

- King of Tyre
- Reign: ended 981 BC
- Successor: Hiram I 980 – 947 BC
- Born: Tyre, presumed
- Died: 981 or 980 BC
- Dynasty: Dynasty of Abibaal and Hiram I

Abibaal (Phoenician: 𐤀𐤁𐤉𐤁𐤏𐤋, romanized: ʾabībaʿl, "My father is Baal") was a king of Tyre in the 10th century BC, father of the famous Hiram I.

== Biography ==
The only information known about him is derived from two passages in Josephus's Against Apion, i.117 and i.118. All that is said in these passages is that he preceded his son Hiram on the throne of Tyre. Neither his length of reign nor his immediate predecessors are known. The dating of Abibaal is therefore dependent on the dates assigned to his son. Here it is only the date of Abibaal's death that can be determined, based on the information preserved in Josephus regarding the length of time between the founding of Carthage (or from Dido's flight from Tyre) until the first year of Hiram. See the Hiram I article for details on determining this date.

== See also ==
- Hiram I
- Pygmalion for discussion of date of founding of Carthage used by Menander
- King of Tyre
