= Hiram I =

- King of Tyre
- Reign: 34 regnal years 980–947 BC (?)
- Predecessor: Abibaal, ?? – 981 BC (?)
- Successor: Baal-Eser I (Beleazarus I, Ba'l-mazzer I) 946–930 BC (?)
- Born: ~1000 BC; Tyre (presumed)
- Died: 947 or 946 BC (presumed) (aged 53)
- Dynasty: Dynasty of Abibaal and Hiram I
- Father: Abibaal
- Mother: Unknown

Hiram I (Phoenician: 𐤇𐤓𐤌 Ḥirōm 'my brother is exalted'; Hebrew: חירם Ḥīrām; also called Hirom or Huram) was a Phoenician king of Tyre. His regnal years have been calculated by some as 980 to 947 BC, in succession to his father, Abibaal. Hiram was succeeded as King of Tyre by his son Baal-Eser I. Hiram is also mentioned in the writings of Menander of Ephesus (early 2nd century BC), as preserved in Josephus's Against Apion, which adds to the biblical account. According to Josephus, Hiram lived for 53 years and reigned for 34.

== Reign ==
During Hiram's reign, Tyre grew from a satellite of Sidon into the most important of Phoenician cities, and the holder of a large trading empire. He suppressed the rebellion of the first Tyrean colony at Utica, near the later site of Carthage (Against Apion i:18).

The Hebrew Bible says that he allied himself with David, king of Judah and his artisans built David's palace in Jerusalem after his capture of the city. The palace was built using Lebanon Cedar. After David's death, Hiram maintained his alliance with David's son and successor Solomon, again as an equal ("אחי", meaning "my brother") Through the alliance with Solomon, Hiram ensured himself access to the major trade routes to Egypt, Arabia and Mesopotamia. The two kings also jointly opened a trade route over the Red Sea, connecting the Israelite harbour of Ezion-Geber with a land called Ophir. Some schools of thought suggest that this land of Ophir was in the port city of Sopara, near modern Mumbai (Bombay), India.

According to the Bible, both kings grew rich through this trade, and Hiram sent Solomon architects, workmen, cedar wood, and gold to build the First Temple in Jerusalem. Josephus says that he also extended the Tyrean harbour, enlarged the city by joining the two islands on which it was built, and constructed a royal palace and a temple for Melqart (Against Apion i:17)

== Hypotheses regarding chronology of reign ==
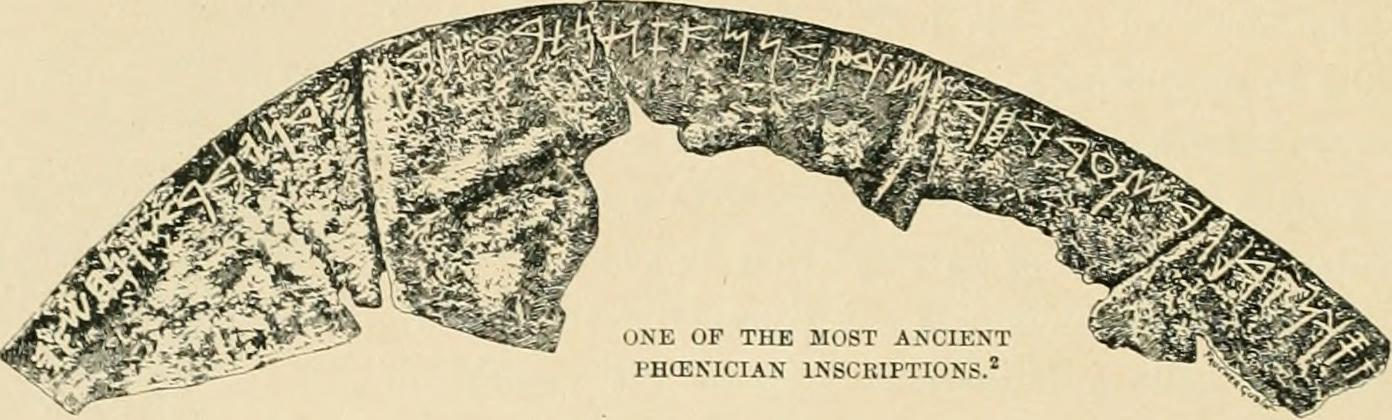
The Baal Lebanon inscription is thought to mention Hiram.

The beginning date of Hiram's reign is derived from a statement by Josephus by citing both Tyrian court records and the writings of Menander, relating that 143 years passed between the start of construction of Solomon's Temple until the founding of Carthage (or until Dido's flight that led to its founding). Josephus also related that Hiram's reign began 155 years and 8 months before that event and that construction of Solomon's Temple began in the twelfth year of Hiram's reign, which would be 143 years before the building of Carthage.

As pointed out by William Barnes (1801–1886), the date for the start of Temple construction using the Tyrian data is derived "wholly independently" of the way that date is derived by using the Scriptural data.

By incorporating another source, Pompeius Trogus' date for the founding of Carthage (825 B.C.), we can arrive at an alternate solution. This approach places the beginning of Hiram's reign in 979/8 B.C. and the commencement of Temple construction eleven years later, in 968/7 B.C. Most chronological systems place the start of Solomon's reign around 971/70 B.C.

== Hiram I of Tyre: ally and potential facilitator of Solomon's Golden Age ==
Hiram I, king of Tyre, ruled a powerful Phoenician city-state during the 10th century BC. The exact dates of his reign are debated by scholars, with estimates placing it between 980 and 947 BC. His reign coincided with the rise of the United Kingdom of Israel under King David and his son, Solomon. The available evidence, primarily drawn from the Hebrew Bible and archaeological discoveries, suggests a potentially significant relationship between Hiram and the Israelite kings, particularly Solomon.

The Hebrew Bible portrays Hiram as a close associate of the Israelite monarchs (1 Kings 5:1-18; 2 Chronicles 2:2-16). According to the biblical narrative, Hiram supplied skilled laborers, cedar wood, and other materials to King David for the construction of his palace in Jerusalem (1 Chronicles 14:1). This account, while potentially embellished, hints at a cooperative relationship between the two leaders.

However, it is during Solomon's reign that the most detailed descriptions of Hiram's role emerge. The Bible describes a specific agreement between the two kings for the construction of monumental projects in Jerusalem: Solomon's Temple and his royal palace (1 Kings 5). This agreement, if factual, suggests a formalized partnership. The narrative details that Hiram provided skilled laborers, artisans, and vast quantities of prized cedar and cypress wood from the forests of Lebanon (1 Kings 5:6-10). In return, Solomon offered Tyre essential resources like wheat, barley, olive oil, and wine (1 Kings 5:11-12). This exchange, if accurately depicted, highlights the potential for a mutually beneficial economic relationship fostered by the agreement.

Beyond the Hebrew Bible, references to Hiram are limited. Notably, Josephus, a 1st-century AD Jewish historian, mentions Hiram in his work "Against Apion" (i:18). Citing Menander of Ephesus, a 3rd-century BC historian, Josephus credits Hiram with quelling a rebellion in the Phoenician colony of Utica (near modern-day Carthage). Rabbinic literature identifies Hiram as one of the four men who pretended to be gods. Nebuchadnezzar was equally victorious in his expedition against Tyre, whose king, Hiram, his stepfather, he dethroned and put to a painful death (Lev. R. xviii. 2; Yalḳ., Ezek. 367).

While limited historical evidence exists outside the Bible, it suggests a period of prosperity and expansion for Tyre under Hiram's leadership. The potential alliance with Israel could have provided Tyre with access to valuable resources and new markets. Conversely, Solomon might have benefitted from Tyre's skilled workforce and expertise in maritime trade and construction. Further research is necessary to definitively establish the nature and extent of their collaboration. Regardless, Hiram's reign likely marked a period of significant cultural and economic exchange between the two kingdoms, with a lasting impact on the region.

== "Tomb of Hiram" ==
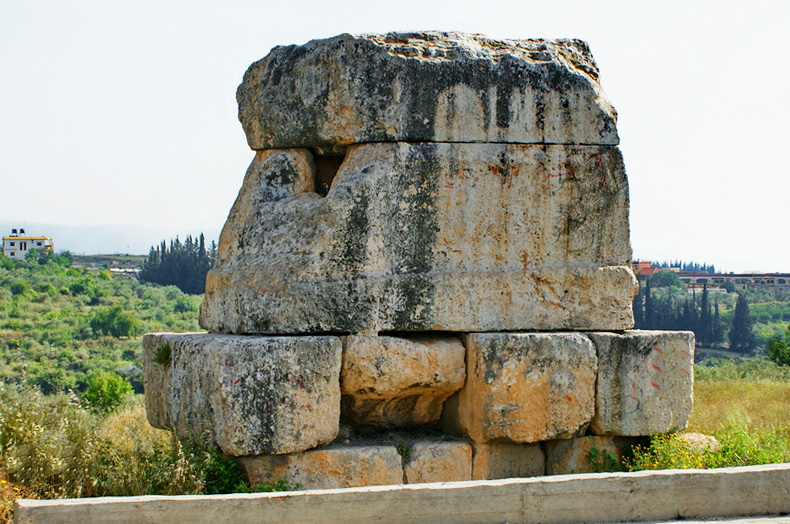
The "Tomb of Hiram", as seen in 2009

The "Tomb of Hiram" (Qabr Hiram) dates from the Persian period, four to six centuries after the presumed time of Hiram. It is built 6 km southeast of Tyre, near the village of Hanaouay, on the road to Qana and has the form of a colossal limestone sarcophagus on a pedestal.

== In modern fiction ==
King Hiram is a character in the time travel story Ivory, and Apes, and Peacocks (1983) by Poul Anderson.

== Namesakes ==
In 1829, the Town of Tyre was formed in Seneca County in the state of New York and the choice of its name was presumably inspired by ancient Tyre, according to the Town Historian. Likewise, its Hiram Lay Cobblestone Farmhouse, which is on the National Register of Historic Places, was apparently named after the Phoenician king.

In the Southern Lebanese city of Tyre there is a neighbourhood called Hay Hiram, located in Tyre's northern municipality of Abassiyat. Hiram Hospital is based in that neighbourhood and nearby there is a Hiram Pharmacy. In the centre of Tyre's Sour municipality main street is named after Hiram (spelled Hyram on Google Maps). Hiram Street suffers from high traffic congestion, air and noise pollution.

== See also ==
- List of kings of Tyre
- Pygmalion for discussion of date of founding of Carthage used by Menander
