= King of Tyre =

The King of Tyre was the ruler of Tyre, the ancient Phoenician city-state in what is now Tyre, Lebanon. The traditional list of 12 kings, with reigns dated to 990–785 BC, is derived from the lost history of Menander of Ephesus as quoted by Josephus in Against Apion I. 116–127. Josephus asserts that Menander had drawn his list from the chronicles of Tyre itself. Menander-Josephus also contains a list of 9 kings and judges, with reigns dated to 591–532 BC in Against Apion I. 154–160.

== Ancient Tyrian rulers based on Hellenic mythology ==
Agenor	c. 2050–1450 BC	Son of Poseidon or of Belus. Doric Greek historian Herodotus (c. 484–425 BC), born in Halicarnassus under the Achaemenid Empire, estimated in the Histories written at the end of the Greco-Persian Wars (499–449 BC) that Agenor had lived either 1000 or 1600 years prior to his visit to Tyre in 450 BC. Father of Europa and Cadmus, founder of the city-state Thebes.
Phoenix		Son of Agenor. He is the alleged eponym of the Phoenicians.

== Late Bronze Age rulers ==
Abimilki	c. 1350–1335 BC	Mayor/Ruler of Tyre during the period of the Amarna letters correspondence (1350–1335 BC)

== Kings of the Sidonians (with Tyre as capital), 990–785 BC ==
The dates for the reconstruction of Menander's Tyrian king list from Abibaal through Pygmalion are established in three places by three independent sources: a Biblical synchronism (Hiram's assistance to Solomon in building the Temple, from 967 BC onwards), an Assyrian record (tribute of Baal-Eser II to Shalmaneser III in 841 BC), and a Roman historian (Pompeius Trogus, who placed the founding of Carthage or Dido's flight from her brother Pygmalion in the latter's seventh year of reign, in 825 BC, 72 years before the founding of Rome).

Abibaal	993–981 BC	His beginning date is conjectural.
Hiram I	980–947 BC	Contemporary of David and Solomon
Baal-Eser I (Balazeros I, Ba‘l-mazzer I)	946–930 BC	
Abdastartus (‘Abd-‘Astart)	929–921 BC	
Astartus (‘Ashtart)	920–901 BC	Killed predecessor. First of 4 brothers to reign.
Deleastartus (Dalay-‘Ashtart)	900–889 BC	
Astarymus (‘Ashtar-rom)	888–880 BC	
Phelles (Pilles)	879 BC	Last of the 4 brothers
Ithobaal I (Ethbaal I)	878–847 BC	Killed predecessor. Father of Biblical Jezebel.
Baal-Eser II (Balazeros II, Ba‘l-mazzer II)	846–841 BC	Paid tribute to Shalmaneser III in 841 BC
Mattan I	840–832 BC	Father of Pygmalion and Dido
Pygmalion (Pummay)	831–785 BC	Dido fled from Pygmalion and founded Carthage during his reign.

== Assyrian ascendancy: 8th and 7th centuries BC ==
The Neo-Assyrian Empire established its control over the area and ruled through vassals who are named in Assyrian records.

Ithobaal II (Tuba‘il)	750–739 BC	Name found only on Iran Stele of Tiglath-Pileser III. Gave tribute to Tiglath-Pileser III.
Hiram II	739–730 BC	Also paid tribute to Tiglath-Pileser III
Mattan II	730–729 BC	
Elulaios (Luli)	729–694 BC	
Abd Melqart	694–680 BC	
Baal I	680–660 BC	

== Post-Assyrian period ==
Menander's Tyrian king list also described the period from Ithobaal III through Hiram III. Tyre regained independence with Assyria's demise, although Egypt controlled Tyre during some of the time afterwards. Eventually, Tyre fell under the control of the Neo-Babylonian Empire.

missing	–592 BC	
Ithobaal III (Ethbaal III)	591–573 BC	This is the king mentioned in Ezekiel 28:2 at the time of the fall of Jerusalem. Carthage became independent of Tyre in 574 BC.

=== Shoftim of Tyre ===
In the 560s the monarchy was overthrown, and an oligarchic government established, headed by "judges" or shoftim (cf. Carthage). The monarchy was restored with the ascension of Hiram III to the throne. Josephus mentions these judges in his treatise Against Apion (Book I, §21), and which last judge (Hiram III) is said to have been contemporary with Cyrus the Great. According to Josephus, Hiram's reign extended to the fourteenth year of Cyrus', ascension to power in Babylon. Cyrus took control of Babylon on October 29, 539, therefore Hiram III's rule spanned from 551 to 532 BC.

== Under Persian control 539–411 BC ==
- Mattan IV fl. c. 490–480
- Boulomenus fl. c. 450
- Abdemon c.420–411 BC. He ruled Salamis, in Cyprus.

== Under control of Cypriot Salamis 411–374 BC ==
- Evagoras of Salamis, Cyprus. He united Cyprus under his rule and achieved independence from the Persian Empire.

== Under Persian control 374–332 BC ==
- Eugoras fl. 340s
- Azemilcus c.340–332 BC. He was king during the siege by Alexander the Great.

== Under the Greeks and Romans ==
After Alexander the Great conquered Tyre in 332 BC, the city alternated between Seleucid (Syrian Greek) and Ptolemaic (Egyptian Greek) rule. Phoenicia came under the rule of the Roman Republic in the 1st century BC.

- Marion (c. 42 BC) was the Roman tyrant of Tyre.

== Historical summary ==
The Kingdom of Tyre emerged in the early second millennium BCE as one of the leading Phoenician maritime powers and reached its height between the 10th and 8th centuries BCE, especially under King Hiram I, when it expanded trade networks across the Mediterranean and supplied cedar and craftsmen for monumental projects such as those attributed to Solomon in Jerusalem; from its strategic island stronghold, Tyre built a vast commercial empire and founded colonies, most famously Carthage, spreading Phoenician culture, navigation skills, and the lucrative production of purple dye extracted from murex shells. Although it maintained considerable autonomy, Tyre paid tribute to Assyria and later endured a long siege by Nebuchadnezzar II in the 6th century BCE, after which it came under Achaemenid Persian rule, contributing ships to the imperial navy until its dramatic conquest by Alexander the Great in 332 BCE, who built a causeway to capture the island city; subsequently incorporated into the Hellenistic kingdoms and then the Roman Empire in 64 BCE, Tyre flourished as a prosperous urban center known for trade, textiles, and culture before gradually declining in the medieval period, though its archaeological remains still testify to its former status as one of the most influential seafaring cities of the ancient Mediterranean world.

== See also ==
- King of Byblos
- King of Sidon
- Hiram I, for a discussion of the date of Carthage's foundation
- Belus of Tyre, a legendary king of Tyre in Vergil's Aeneid
- Pygmalion of Tyre, for inscriptional evidence regarding Pygmalion and Baal-Eser II
- Apollonius of Tyre, a fictional king of Tyre, eponymous hero of a short ancient novel
- Dido of Carthage
