= Belus (Tyre) =

Belus was a legendary king of Tyre in Virgil's Aeneid and other Latin works. He was said to have been the father of Dido of Carthage, Pygmalion of Tyre, and Anna Perenna. The historical father of these figures was the king Mattan I (reigned 840 BC – 832 BCE), also known as MTN-BʿL (Matan-Baʿal, 'Gift of the Lord'), which classicist T. T. Duke suggests was made into the name Belus as a hypocorism.

== See also ==
- Other people and places named Belus
- King of Tyre, list of historical kings of Tyre
- Melqart, Baal of Tyre
- Baal-Eser II, identified by some to be Balazeros (grandfather of Pygmalion according to Menander of Ephesus)
