= Archaeological interest of Pedra da Gávea =

Unconfirmed archaeological hypotheses

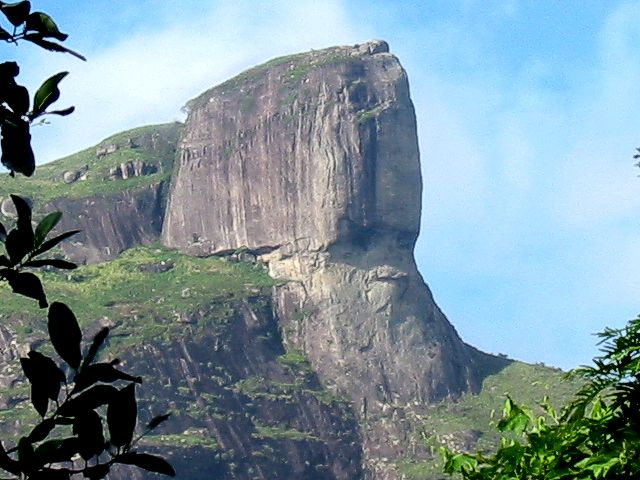
Pedra da Gávea, Rio de Janeiro. The "eyes" of the "face" are looking towards the right-hand of this picture. The etchings that can be seen on the dome of the mountain make up the supposed inscription.

Pedra da Gávea is a mountain in Tijuca Forest, Rio de Janeiro, Brazil. Differential weathering on one side of the rock has created what is described as a stylized human face, and weathered markings on another face of the rock have been described as an inscription. Some individuals, such as Bernardo de Azevedo da Silva Ramos, have advanced the position that the inscription is of Phoenician origin and possibly proof of pre-Columbian contact from Old World cultures. Alternative theories proposed include that the rock was the site of a Norse colony or that it is connected with suspected UFO activity.

Mainstream geologists and scientists are in agreement that the "inscription" is the result of erosion and that the "face" is a product of pareidolia. No credible evidence has ever been collected that backs up the idea that Pedra da Gávea was discovered by Phoenicians or any other civilization. Furthermore, the consensus of archaeologists and scholars in Brazil is that the mountain should not be viewed as an archaeological site, and hypotheses that regard it as such are fringe theories.

== Purported inscription ==
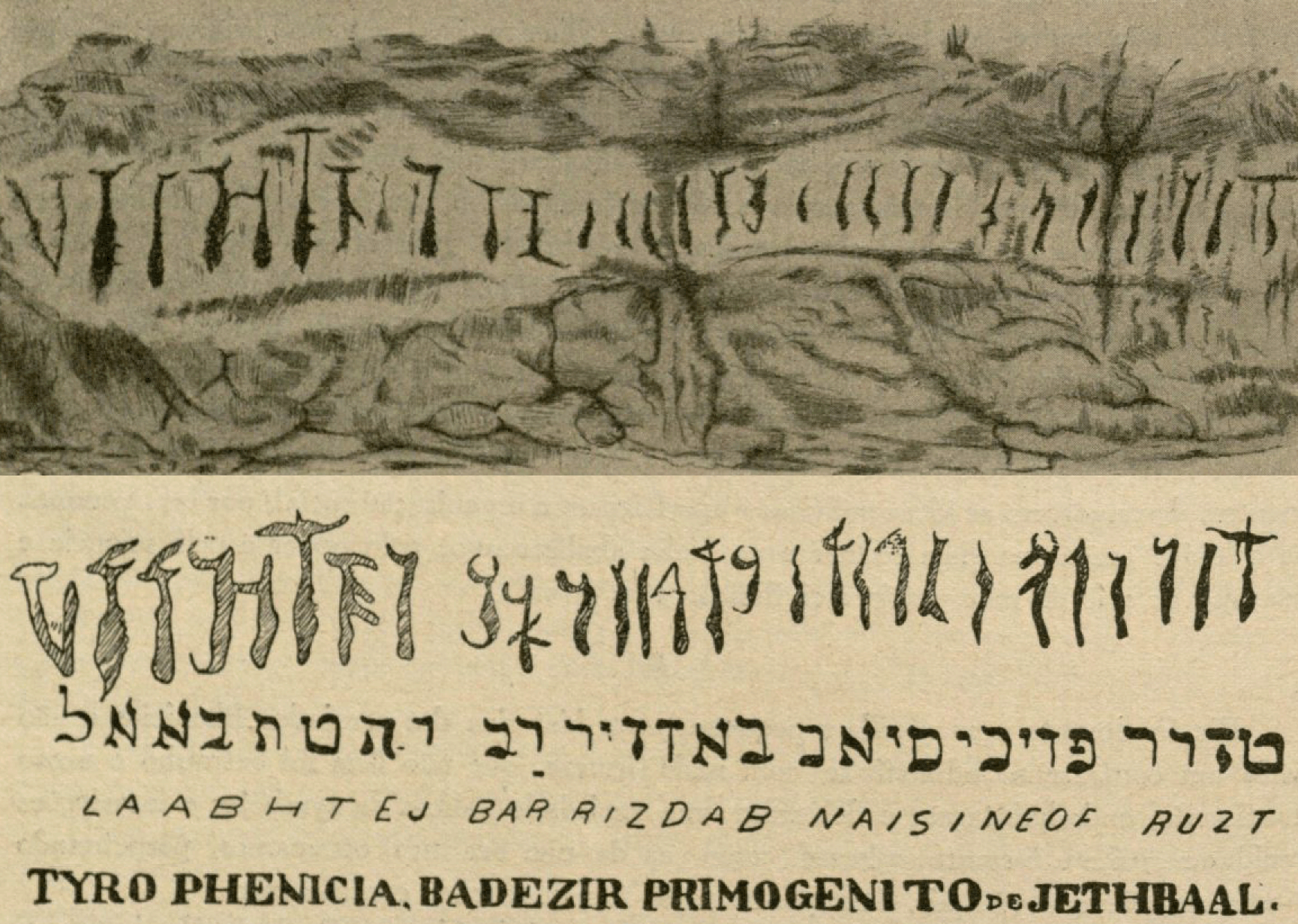
Interpretation of the marks on Pedra da Gávea by Bernardo de Azevedo da Silva Ramos, from his book Tradiçoes da America Pré-Histórica, Especialmente do Brasil. The first row is the supposed inscription in situ, the second row is a rough rendering of the Phoenician characters, the third is a transliteration into Hebrew, the fourth is a rendering of the letters in the Latin alphabet, and the final line is the supposed message in Portuguese.

Many people throughout the years have believed there to be an inscription carved into the rockface of the mountain. Reportedly, Christian missionaries were the first to notice these "markings", and they reported their findings to John VI, the King of Portugal at the time; his son, Pedro I of Brazil later looked into these theories. According to Paul Herrmann in his book Conquests by Man, for many the inscription on the mountain was attributed to "some unknown prehistoric American people" until some began to speculate that the characters were of Phoenician origin.

In 1839, Januário da Cunha Barbosa and Araújo Porto-Alegre, on behalf of the Brazilian Historic and Geographic Institute (IHGB), undertook the first official study of the structure. They later published an article entitled "Relatório Sobre a Inscrição da Gávea" ("The Report on the Inscription of Gávea") in the which they examined the markings more closely. Barbosa and Porto-Alegre argued that there were only two viable hypotheses that could explain the markings: either "the inscription was made by ancient people who landed on the Brazilian coast, or it was the result of mere chance." If the former were the answer, the two voiced hope that one day a "Brazilian Champollion" would be able to decipher the inscription.

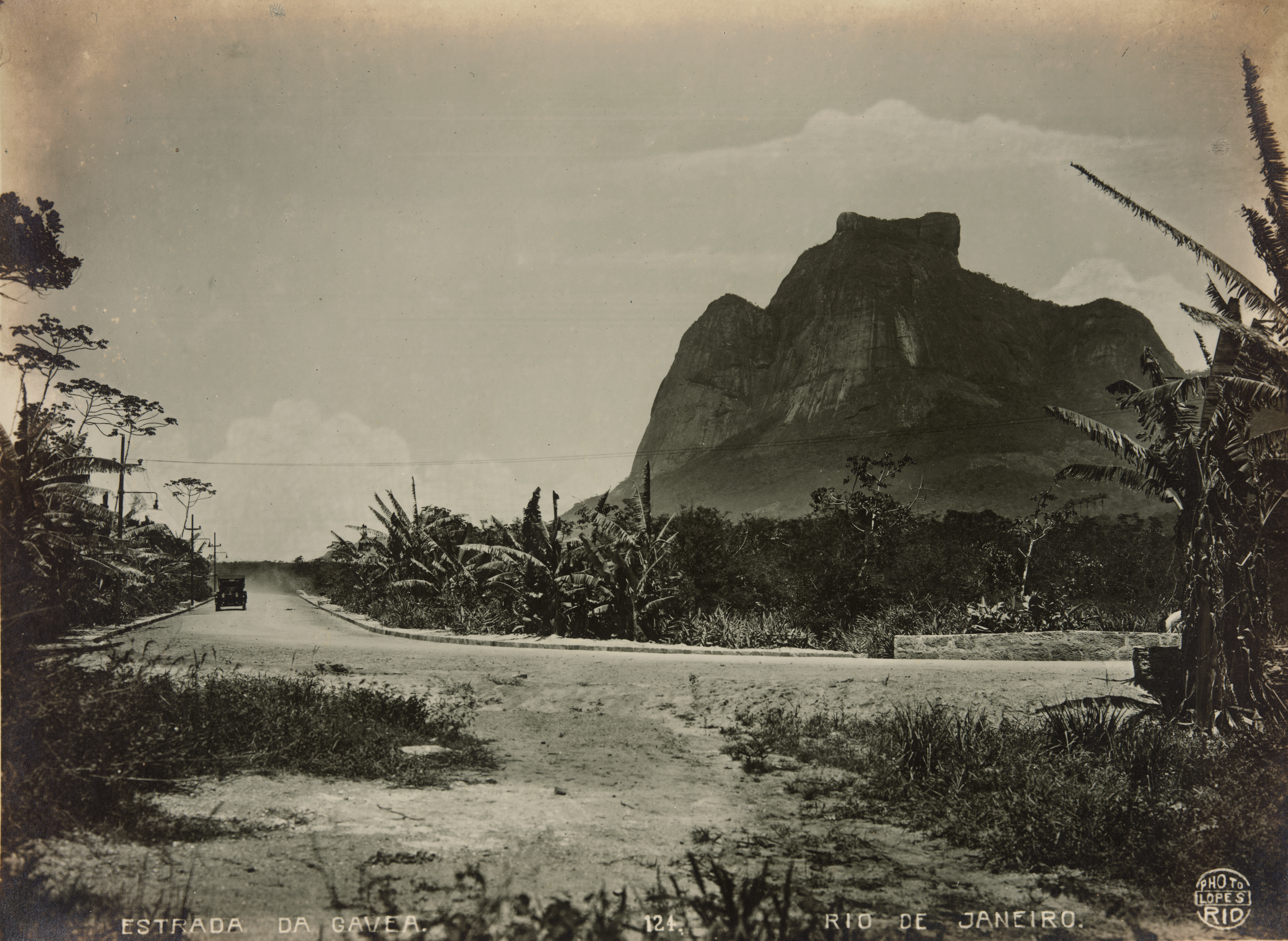
Estrada da Gávea, c. 1920–30.

In the 1930s, Brazilian archaeologist Bernardo de Azevedo da Silva Ramos studied the mountain, hoping that it could provide evidence for his beliefs that "there existed a pre-Columbian civilization on the American Continent contemporary with the apogee of Phoenician and Greek expansion in the Mediterranean." Ramos traveled to Pedra da Gávea, wrote down the markings described by the IHGB, and then with the aid of a rabbi in Manaus, he claimed to have "succeeded in deciphering the inscriptions". According to him, the inscription, when scanned from right to left (the direction that Phoenician is written), reads "𐤋𐤀𐤀𐤁𐤇𐤕𐤄𐤉𐤁𐤀𐤓𐤓𐤉𐤆𐤃𐤀𐤁𐤍𐤀𐤉𐤔𐤉𐤍𐤄𐤏𐤅𐤓𐤅𐤆𐤕". This inscription, when transliterated into the Latin alphabet, is said to read "TZUR FOENISIAN BADZIR RAB JETHBAAL", which translates roughly to "Tyre, Phoenicia, Badezir, Firstborn of Jethbaal". This supposedly refers to a ruler of Phoenicia named Baal-Eser II (Note: Also written as Badzir, Badezor, Badezorus, Baal-Eser II, and Balbazer II. His father was Ithobaal I, also written as Jethbaal.) who ruled Tyre in the mid-9th century, c. 850 BC. Ramos subsequently published a two-volume book entitled "Inscrições e Tradições da América Pré-Histórica, Especialmente do Brasil" ("Inscriptions and Traditions of Prehistoric America, Especially Brazil") that attempted to document all evidence of supposed Phoenician inscriptions in Brazil. (Note: Scans of both volume 1 and volume 2, in the original Portuguese, are available on the Internet Archive.)

Various other people and organizations have attempted to rationalize and verify the inscription. At least one study was undertaken by a Latter Day Saint Elder named Irineu Petri to find "the possible relation between the inscription … and the Book of Mormon." Argentinian fringe archaeologist Jacques de Mahieu argued that the inscription was not Phoenician, but rather Nordic runes, which read: "Next to this rock, numerous oak planks for ship are deposited on the beaches of sand." Furthermore, he argued that Vikings would have revered the site, as the mountain would have appeared to them as their god Odin. The International Fortean Organization used the 1982 discovery of what were believed to be Phoenician amphorae in Guanabara Bay by Robert F. Marx as evidence that the Phoenicians were at least in the area. (Note: Marx noted that the amphorae could be Phoenician, but were probably of Roman origin, dating from the third century AD. He later speculated that they were probably from a ship that had crashed on the Brazilian coast after being blown across the ocean during a storm.)

In addition to the purported inscription, the "face" of the rock is alleged by some to have been carved around the same time in the likeness of Badezir. Additionally, an issue of The INFO Journal speculated as to whether the mountain contains a Phoenician tomb (although there is no scientific evidence to suggest that this is the case).

== Scientific analysis ==
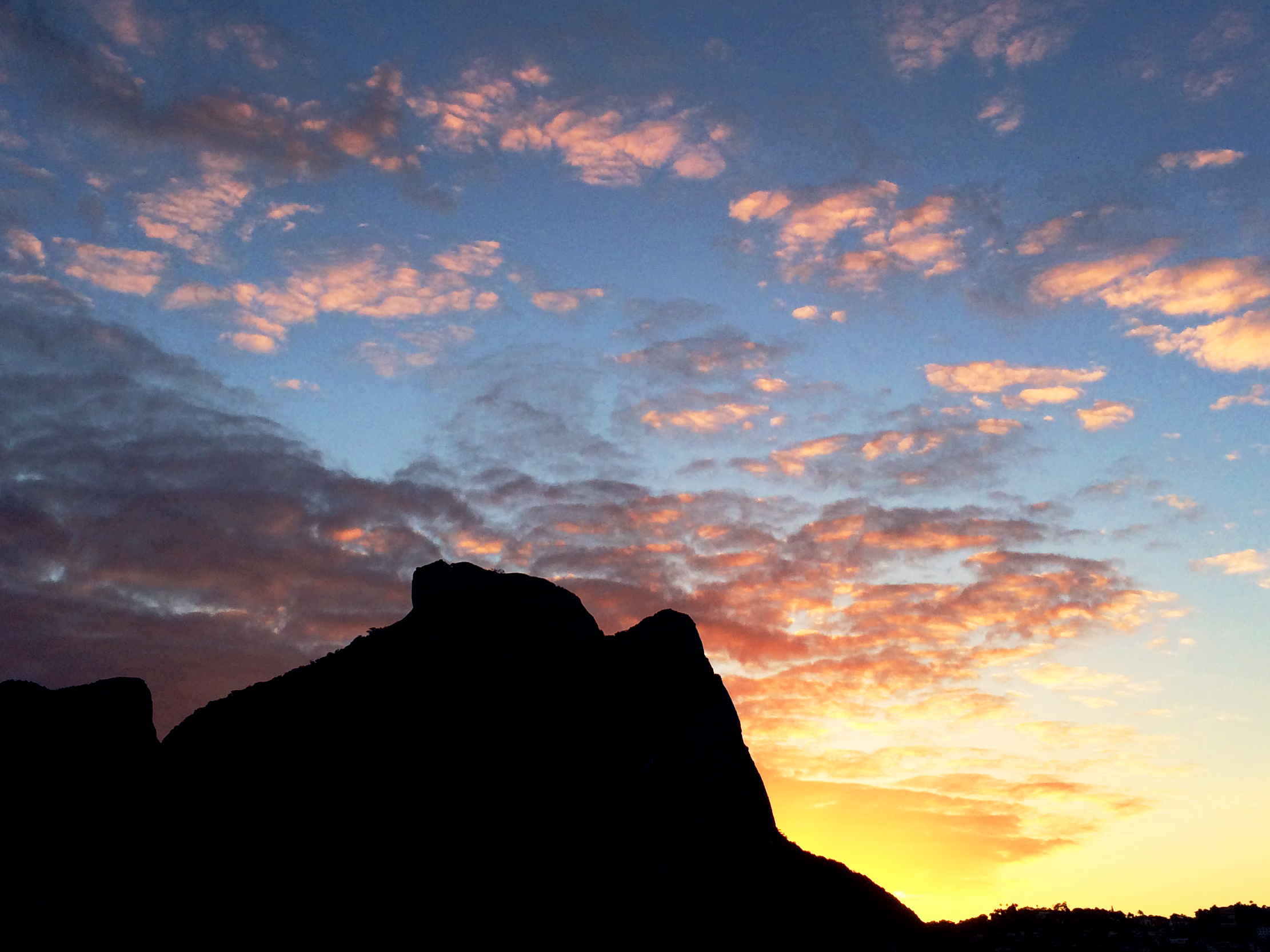
Stone of Gávea at dawn

Because Barbosa and Porto-Alegre's research was carried out during the early years of the reign of Brazilian Emperor Pedro II, Lucia Maria Pascoal Guimarães and Birgitte Holten later postulated that the focus placed on Pedra da Gávea was an attempt by the Brazilian Empire to nation-build and "establish the 'roots' of [an] ethno-cultural" state anchored in the concept of the Old World. Ramos's work in particular was criticized by scientists and scholars. A.R. Nykl wrote that Ramos "adopted wrong principles and consequently arrived at wrong conclusions." Furthermore, Nykl wrote that "to look for Phoenician and Greek equivalents in the mysterious petroglyphs … is pure imagination devoid of any solid basis." In an article for LiveScience, Kim Ann Zimmermann argued that the belief in the inscriptions and "face" at Pedra da Gávea are example of pareidolia, or the psychological phenomenon involving a vague and random stimulus being perceived as significant.

Most researchers suggest that the inscription and "face" are merely the results of erosion. Barbosa and Porto-Alegre initially concluded that while it was possible that the marks were eroded Phoenician letters, there was also the chance that they were made by natural processes. T. Cooper Clark, a fellow of both the Royal Geographical Society and the Royal Anthropological Institute of Great Britain and Ireland, in his article "The XXth International Congress of Americanists", described an expedition that he took to the site, and claimed that "the lines are only formed by erosion" and that "the very inaccessibility of the spot at once dismisses the idea of such marks being the work of man." In the book Geomorphological Landscapes of the World, it is suggested that the "face" of the structure is the result of differential weathering at the point where the granite cap of the mountain meets the gneiss layer. In August 2000, a group of geologists travelled to the summit of Pedra da Gávea with equipment to determine whether the mountain possessed any hollow spaces; their results showed that the structure was solid and that there were no internal tunnels or burial tombs. The group also concluded that the "inscriptions" were just vertical grooves that had been worn into the less resistant parts of the stone.

In the mid-1950s, the Brazilian Ministry of Education and Health denied that the site featured any writing, declaring "that examination by geologists had proved it to be nothing more than the effect of weather erosion which happened to look like an inscription." Brazilian archaeologists and scholars have adopted a "negative attitude" toward the treatment of the site, with Herrmann noting that "Brazilian archaeology denies altogether the existence of Phoenician inscription in any part of the country whatsoever."

== See also ==
- Theory of Phoenician discovery of the Americas
- Archaeology of the Americas
- Geography of Brazil
- Pseudoarchaeology
- Pseudoscience

== Bibliography ==
- Biagini, Antonello; Motta, Giovanna (2014). Empires and Nations from the Eighteenth to the Twentieth Century: Volume 1. Cambridge Scholars Publishing. ISBN 9781443861939.
- Glover, Mark, ed. (1977). The Mormon Church in Latin America: A Periodical Index (1830–1976). Harold B. Lee Library.
- Herrmann, Paul (1954). Conquest by Man. Translated by Michael Bullock. Hamish Hamilton. ISBN 9781199054388.
- Josephus, Flavius (1810). The Genuine Works of Flavius Josephus. Translated by William Whiston. Columbia University. ISBN 9781163637531.
- Marx, Robert (2004). Treasure Lost at Sea: Diving to the World's Great Shipwrecks. Firefly Books. p. 26. ISBN 9781552978726. "roman brazil."
- Migoń, Piotr, ed. (2010). Geomorphological Landscapes of the World. Springer Publishing. ISBN 9789048130559.
- Ramos, Bernardo de Azevedo da Silva (1930). "Capitulo XIV: As inscripções do Morro da Gavea". Inscripções e Tradições da America Prehistorica, Especialmente do Brasil [Inscriptions and Traditions of Prehistoric America, Especially Brazil] (in Brazilian Portuguese). Vol. 1. Rio de Janeiro: Imprensa Nacional.
- Turin, Rodrigo (2005). "A 'Obscura História' Indígena. O discurso Etnográfico no IHGB (1840–1870)". Estudos Sobre a Escrita da História: Anais do Encontro de Historiografia e História Política (in Portuguese). 7Letras. ISBN 9788575773505.
- Twidale, C. R. (1982). Granite Landforms. Elsevier. ISBN 9780444597649.
- Waggoner, John (2008). Brazil Travel Adventures. Hunter Publishing. ISBN 9781588436764.
