= Baal-Eser II =

- King of Tyre
- Reign: 846 BC – 841 BC
- Predecessor: Ithobaal I (Ethbaal, Eshbaal) 878–847 BC
- Successor: Mattan I, 840–832 BC
- Born: 886 BC; Tyre, presumed
- Died: 841 or 840 BC
- Dynasty: House of Ithobalus (Ithobaal I)
- Father: Ithobaal I
- Mother: unknown

Baal-Eser II (846–841 BC), also known as Balbazer II and Ba'l-mazzer I, was a king of Tyre, the son of Ithobaal I, brother of Jezebel and brother-in-law of Ahab.

The primary information related to Baal-Eser II comes from Josephus's citation of the Phoenician author Menander of Ephesus in Against Apion i.18. Here it is said that "Ithobalus, the priest of Astarte...was succeeded by his son Badezorus [Baal-Eser], who lived forty-five years, and reigned six years; he was succeeded by Matgenus [Mattan I] his son." (see king of Tyre)

Baal-Eser reigned at the height of Tyrian influence in the affairs of the Levant. During his reign, his sister was queen of Israel and his niece Athaliah reigned as queen of the Kingdom of Judah, creating a zone of Tyrian influence unrivaled at any period in its history.

Tyre is not mentioned as an opponent of Shalmaneser III at the Battle of Qarqar in 853 BC, but twelve years later, in 841, Ithobaal's son Baal-Eser II (Ba'l-mazzer) gave tribute to the Assyrian monarch, in the latter's 18th year of reign (841 BC). Jehu of Israel paid tribute at the same time, as shown on the Black Obelisk of Shalmaneser III. The mention of Baal-Eser's tribute to Shalmaneser has played an important role in revising upwards by 11 years the reigns of Baal-Eser's successors, Mattan I and Pygmalion, from previously accepted dates for these kings. Consequently, the dates given here are according to the work of Frank Moore Cross and other scholars who take 825 BC as the date of Dido's flight from her brother, Pygmalion of Tyre, after which she founded the city of Carthage in 814 BC. (See the chronological justification for these dates in the Pygmalion article.) For those who date the seventh year of Pygmalion to 814 BC, thereby placing the founding of Carthage in the same year that Dido left Tyre, the dates of Baal-Eser's successors will be 11 years later. The dates used for Baal-Eser in the present article also accept the six years of reign given in the best texts of Menander/Josephus. It is only in some extracts of Eusebius's Chronography that a reign of 18 years is given.

== See also ==
- Archaeological interest of Pedra da Gávea
- Pedra da Gávea#Archaeological interest
- Belus of Tyre
