= Battus of Malta =

Semi-legendary king of Malta

In Greco-Roman mythology, Battus (Ancient Greek: Βάττος) was a semi-legendary king of Malta who offered sanctuary to Anna Perenna, the sister of Dido, the Carthaginian founder in Virgil's Aeneid. Battus features briefly in Ovid's Fasti as the protector of Anna Perenna.

== Appearance in Ovid's Fasti ==
Anna Perenna fleeing to Battus

"Anna, was driven from her home, weeping on leaving
Her sister’s city, after first paying honour to that sister.
The loose ashes drank perfume mixed with tears,
And received an offering of her shorn hair:
Three times she said: ‘Farewell!’ three times lifted
And pressed the ashes to her lips, seeing her sister there.
Finding a ship, and companions for her flight, she glided
Away, looking back at the city, her sister’s sweet work.
There’s a fertile island, Melite, near barren Cosyra,
Lashed by the waves of the Libyan sea. Trusting in
The king’s former hospitality, she headed there,
Battus was king there, and was a wealthy host.
When he had learned the fates of the two sisters,
He said: ‘This land, however small, is yours.’
He would have been hospitable to the end,
Except that he feared Pygmalion’s great power.
The corn had been taken to be threshed a third time,
And a third time the new wine poured into empty vats.
The sun had twice circled the zodiac, and a third year
Was passing, when Anna had to find a fresh place of exile.
Her brother came seeking war. The king hated weapons,
And said: ‘We are peaceable, flee for your own safety!’
She fled at his command, gave her ship to the wind and waves:
Her brother was crueller than any ocean."
- Ovid, (Fasti, Book III, March 15).

After Dido's tragic death, Anna finds refuge from her brother Pygmalion on Malta, with Battus the king of the island and a wealthy host. The "fertile island" of Melite, near Cossyra, provided hospitality to Anna, with Battus saying that ‘This land, however small, is yours.’ Battus would have continued to provide sanctuary to Anna and her companions, but in the third year of her exile, Anna's brother came in her pursuit. The king hated war, as the island was a peaceable sanctuary, and asked Anna to flee for her own safety. She fled at his command, with Battus giving her a ship.

=== Controversy ===
According to Frazer, Ovid is the only source for a king named Battus on Malta. However, Dougall records the discovery of a punic inscription identifying a king Battus on a sepulcher in Malta.

In fact, Dougall mentions how in 1761 an underground sepulcher was found in "khasam ta byn Hysae," that is Bengħisa, in the south side of the island of Malta. The sepulcher had an inscription, made up of forty-seven letters in four lines. The characters were mostly unreadable, however the last line was agreed to state "hal byn bat malek," which signified "for the son of Bat, the king." The same inscription was recorded in the Vocabolario Maltese published by Mikiel Anton Vassalli in 1796.

The story linking Anna Perenna with Malta can only be found in Ovid, and derivative works. Another epic poet, Silius Italicus, bypasses Anna's arrival in Malta, and places her refuge with a King Battus in the Greek colony of Cyrene, in North Africa. In both stories, Anna is seen to find safety in Battus' kingdom, with both versions having the king advise Anna to flee for another place of refuge because of Pygmalion, and in both stories Battus is represented as a rich and hospitable king. Moreover, Battus is the historical name of the first Greek king to have established a colony in Cyrene, with at least three other kings bearing that same name.

The existence of King Battus on Malta, or at least the occurrence of a pre-existing tradition of a reigning Phoenician king on Malta, is the source of significant controversy in Maltese classical literature. Battus' link with Malta is usually dismissed, and it is generally accepted that he reigned over Cyrene. According to Anthony Bonano in his book "Malta: Phoenician, Punic and Roman", the real name of this king was Aristoteles and only started being called 'Battus' after becoming king of the colony, as, as described by Herodotus, 'Battus' was the local, North African word for 'king'. Busuttil (1970) singles out the parallels with Italicus' story as evidence that Ovid places King Battus on Malta purely for literary purposes. Busuttil then focuses on Ovid's indications that in his contemporary times Malta was prosperous and its agriculture fertile. Any links with Battus' kingdom, according to Busuttil, might have resulted from Malta borrowing iconography from Cyrene, most notably for its coins.

Legendary titles
| Unknown | King of Malta | Unknown |
