= Mattan I =

- King of Tyre
- Reign: 840 BC – 832 BC
- Predecessor: Baal-Eser II (Balazeros, Ba‘l-mazzer II) 846-841 BC
- Successor: Pygmalion 831 – 785 BC
- Born: 864 BC; Tyre, presumed
- Died: 832 BC
- Dynasty: House of Ithobalus (Ithobaal I)
- Father: Baal-Eser II (Balazeros, Ba‘l-mazzer II)
- Mother: unknown

Mattan, Matan, or Mittin ruled Tyre from 840 to 832 BC, succeeding his father Baal-Eser II.

He was the father of Pygmalion, king of Tyre from 831 to 785 BC, and of Dido, the legendary queen of Carthage.

The primary information related to Mattan I comes from Josephus’s citation of the Phoenician author Menander of Ephesus in Against Apion i.18. Here it is said that "Badezorus was succeeded by Matgenus his son: he lived thirty-two years and reigned nine years: Pygmalion succeeded him".

Alternative dates for his reign, from 829 to 821 BC, are given in the work of F. M. Cross and other scholars who take 825 BC as the date of Dido’s flight from her brother Pygmalion, after which she founded the city of Carthage in 814 BC. For those who place the seventh year of Pygmalion in 814 BC, i.e. in the same year that Dido left Tyre, the dates of Mattan and Pygmalion will be 11 years later.

Classicist T. T. Duke states that Mattan was also known as MTN-BʿL (Matan-Baʿal, 'Gift of the Lord'), which was turned hypocoristically into King Belus of Tyre in Virgil's Aeneid.

== See also ==
- List of Kings of Tyre
- Belus of Tyre, Dido and Pygmalion's father in Vergil's Aeneid
