= Gávea (disambiguation) =

Gávea is a neighborhood located in Rio de Janeiro, Brazil.

Gávea may also refer to:

- Estádio da Gávea, a Brazilian football stadium
- Hipódromo da Gávea, a Brazilian horse racing venue
- Pedra da Gávea, "Rock of the topsail", a large natural formation visible on a seaborne approach to Rio de Janeiro
