= Anna Perenna =

Roman deity

- Goddess of the Wheel of the Year
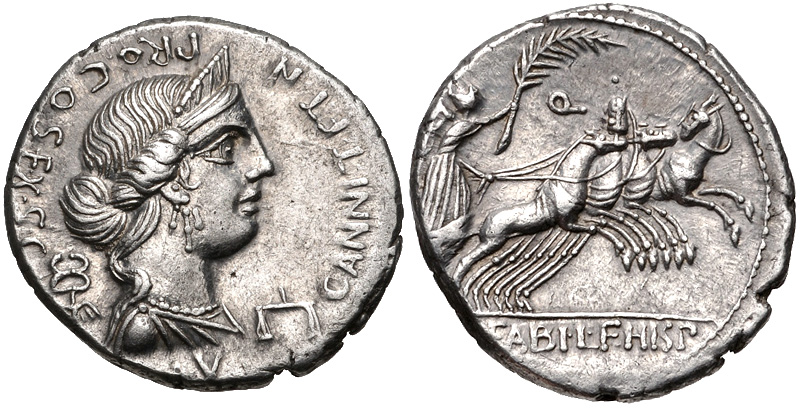
- Anna Perenna (left) with stephane on a denarius of 82–81 BC. The coin was minted by Gaius Annius of the gens Annia, who claimed descent from Anna Perenna.
- Abode: A grove on the first milestone on the Via Flaminia
- Festivals: Ides of March

Genealogy
- Siblings: Dido and Pygmalion

In Roman mythology, Anna Perenna was a minor deity of the circle, wheel, or "ring" of the year, as indicated by her title Perenna (per annum).

== Origin ==
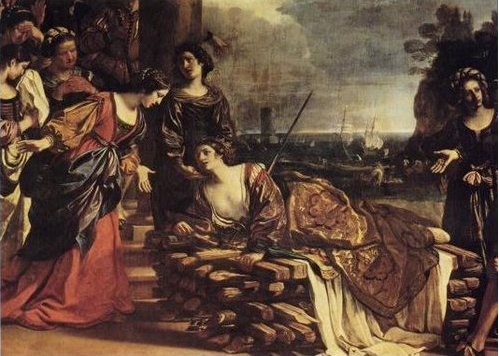
Suicide of Dido, a representation of Dido being rescued by her sister Anna, later identified with the Roman divinity Anna Perenna, oil on canvas by Guercino, 1625, Rome, Galleria Spada.

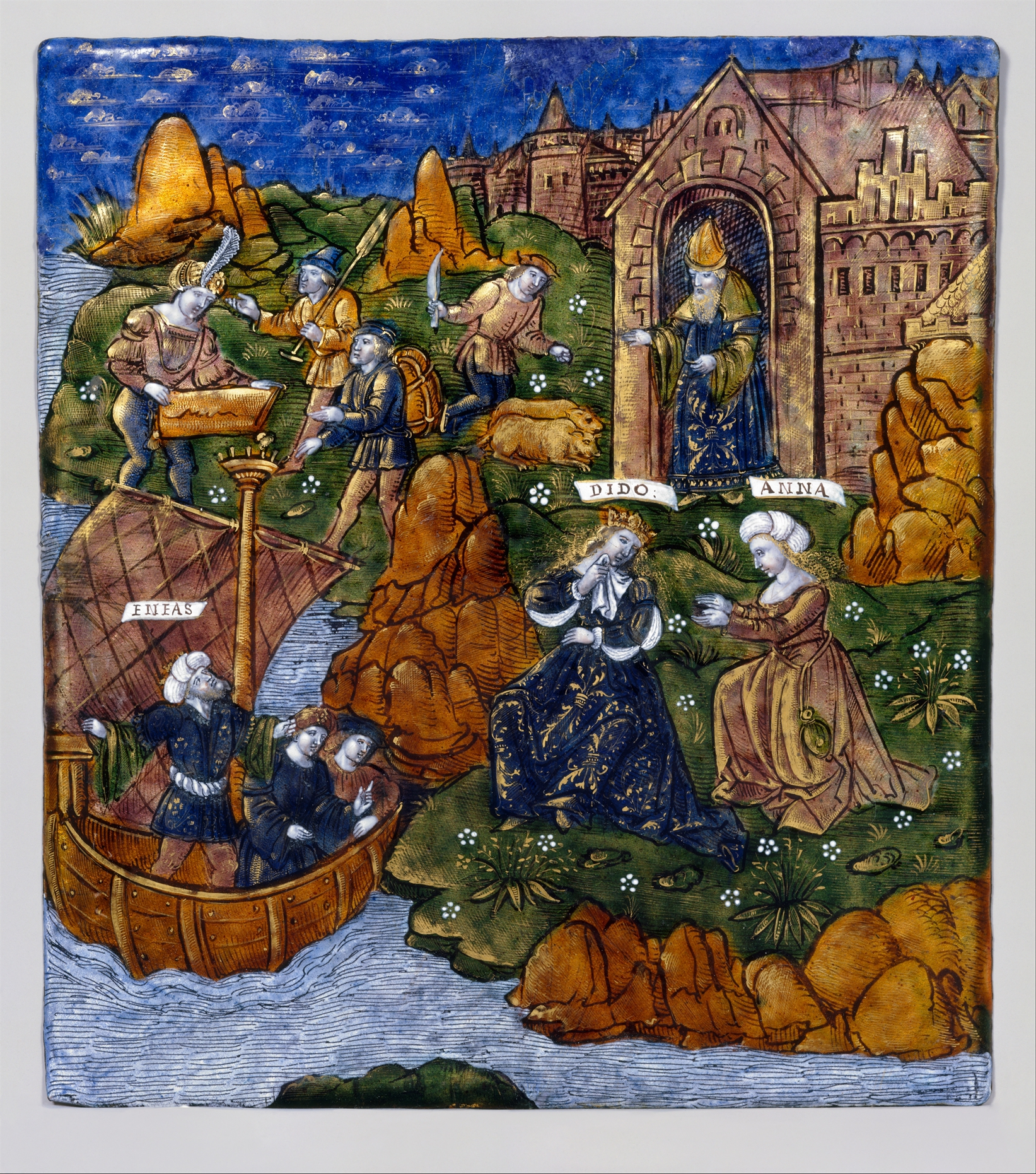
Aeneas Departs From Carthage; Anna and Dido are labelled.

Roman poet Ovid reports a legend that conflates Anna Perenna with Anna, the sister of Dido: queen and founder of Carthage in Virgil's Aeneid. After Dido's tragic death, Anna finds refuge from her brother Pygmalion on Malta with Battus, the king of the island and a wealthy host. After protecting Anna for three years, Battus counselled her to flee for her safety and find a fresh place of exile as her brother was seeking war. Forced again to flee over the seas, Anna was shipwrecked on the coasts of Latium where she was hosted by Aeneas's settlement of Lavinium. However, her presence there made Lavinia increasingly jealous, and she planned to murder Anna. Dido appeared in Anna's dream, exhorting her to abandon her latest refuge. Anna obeyed, and she was swept away by the river-god Numicus and transformed into a river nymph hidden in the "perennial stream" (amnis perennis), and renamed Anna Perenna.

Ovid adds that some equate Anna Perenna with the moon, Themis, Io, and Amaltheia. However, he prefers the legend that during the secessio plebis, an old woman named Anna living in Bovillae baked cakes every morning and brought them to the hungry rebels; in gratitude, the plebeians worshipped her as a goddess. Ovid goes on to report that after old Anna had become a goddess, she impersonated Minerva to gain admission to the god Mars' bedchamber, which is why coarse jokes and coarse songs are used at Anna Perenna's festivities. He remarks that since the festival of Anna Perenna is in the month dedicated to Mars (March), it is reasonable that Mars and Anna Perenna should be associated as cult partners.

In the 1930s Franz Altheim, an authority on Roman religion, suggested that Anna Perenna was originally an Etruscan mother goddess, and that her relationship with Aeneas was developed to strengthen her association with Rome.

== Festival ==
Anna Perenna's festival fell on the Ides of March (March 15), which would have marked the first full moon in the year in the old lunar Roman calendar, when March was recognized as the first month of the year. The festival was held at the goddess' grove at the first milestone on the Via Flaminia. It was much frequented by the city plebeians. Macrobius records that offerings were made to her ut annare perannareque commode liceat, i.e., "that the circle of the year may be completed happily" and that people sacrificed to her both publicly and privately. Johannes Lydus says that public sacrifice and prayers were offered to her to secure a healthy year. In his Fasti, Ovid provides a vivid description of her outdoor festival:

On the Ides is held the jovial feast of Anna Perenna not far from the banks, O Tiber, who comest from afar. The common folk come, and scattered here and there over the green grass they drink, every lad reclining beside his lass. Some camp under the open sky; a few pitch tents; some make a leafy hut of boughs. Others set up reeds in place of rigid pillars, and stretching out their robes place them upon the reeds. But they grow warm with sun and wine, and they pray for as many years as they take cups, and they count the cups they drink.

== Cult ==
Two places of worship of Anna Perenna are attested. One was in Buscemi, Sicily, where in 1899 some inscriptions to Anna and Apollo were found. The other was in Rome, where a fountain devoted to Anna Perenna rites was unearthed in 1999.
