= Jezebel =

Biblical figure; Phoenician princess and wife of Ahab

Jezebel אִיזֶ֗בֶל
- Queen of Israel
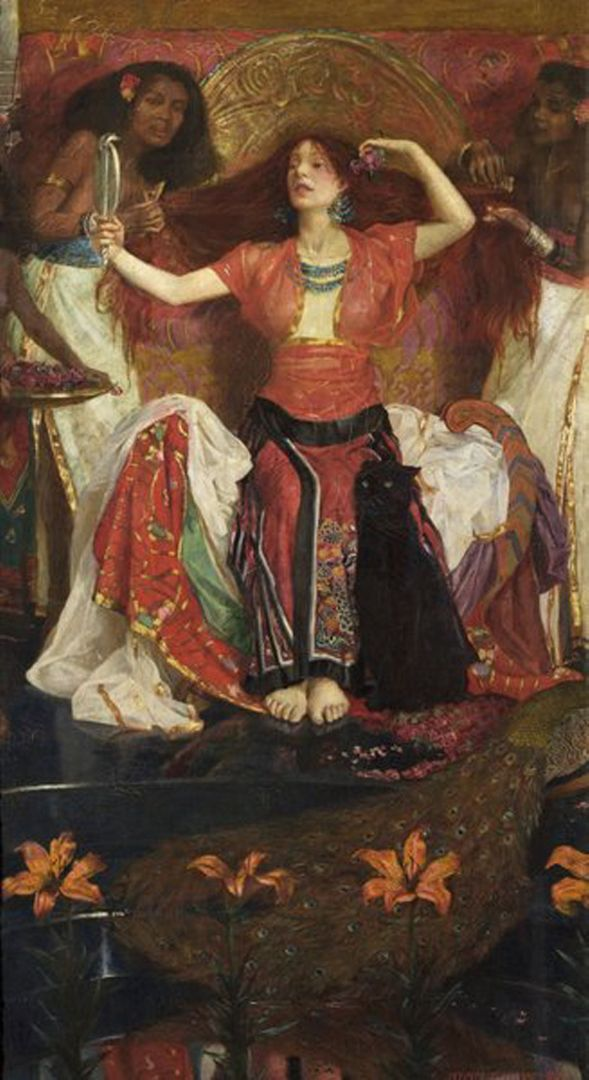
- Byam Shaw, 1896
- Died: c. 842 BC; Tel Jezreel
- Spouse: King Ahab
- Issue: Ahaziah; Jehoram; Athaliah?
- Dynasty: Began house of Ithobaal/Ithobalus
- Father: Ithobaal I
- Religion: Canaanite

Jezebel (/ˈdʒɛzəbəl, -bɛl/) was the daughter of Ithobaal I of Tyre and the wife of Ahab, King of Israel, according to the Book of Kings of the Hebrew Bible (1 Kings 16).

In the biblical narrative, Jezebel replaced Yahwism with Baal and Asherah worship and was responsible for Naboth's death. This caused irreversible damage to the reputation of the Omride dynasty, who were already unpopular among the Israelites. For these offences, Jezebel was defenestrated, under Jehu's orders (2 Kings 9), and devoured by dogs as prophesied by Elijah (1 Kings 16). In the Book of Revelation, the name Jezebel is contemptuously attributed to a prophetic woman of Thyatira, whom the author, through the voice of the risen Christ, accuses of leading her followers into fornication (idolatry). For refusing to repent, she is threatened with illness and the death of her children.

Jezebel, an Anglicized form of the Hebrew name אִיזֶבֶל (ʾIzeḇel), is often interpreted as meaning “Where is the Lord?”—a phrase linked to Baal worship rituals. As queen, according to the Hebrew Bible, Jezebel promoted the worship of Baal and Asherah in Samaria, clashing with the followers of Yahweh, killing prophets, and challenging established religious norms. Notable events in her biblical narrative include her conflict with the prophet Elijah, the orchestrated execution of Naboth to secure a vineyard for Ahab, and her violent death at the hands of Jehu, fulfilling Elijah’s prophecy. Scholars debate the historicity of her story, noting inconsistencies and theological bias in the biblical accounts. Some evidence exists in the form of royal seals and extrabiblical records, suggesting that she may have been a real political figure engaged in the complex religious and dynastic politics of her time.

Over centuries, Jezebel became a cultural symbol associated with false prophets, manipulative women, and promiscuity. In Christian traditions, she was seen as leading others into idolatry and sin, and her image influenced medieval and modern perceptions of powerful or nonconforming women. The concept of the “Jezebel spirit” has emerged in some American Christian circles, portraying her as a demonic influence in spiritual and political contexts. Jezebel has also permeated popular culture through literature, music, and film, often reinterpreted as a misunderstood or vilified figure, inspiring works ranging from William Wyler's 1938 film Jezebel to contemporary songs, novels, and feminist scholarship that challenge traditional portrayals of her character.

== Meaning of name ==
Jezebel is the Anglicized transliteration of Biblical Hebrew: איזבל, romanized: ʾIzeḇel. The Oxford Guide to People & Places of the Bible states that the name is "best understood as meaning 'Where is the Lord?'" (Biblical Hebrew: אֵיזֶה בַּעַל, romanized: ʾēze baʿal), a ritual cry from worship ceremonies in honor of Baal during periods of the year when the god was considered to be in the underworld. Alternatively, a feminine Punic name noted by the Corpus Inscriptionum Semiticarum, Phoenician: 𐤁𐤏𐤋𐤀𐤆𐤁𐤋, romanized: bʿlʾzbl, may have been a cognate to the original form of the name, as the Israelites were known to often alter personal names which invoked the names of foreign gods.

== Biblical account ==
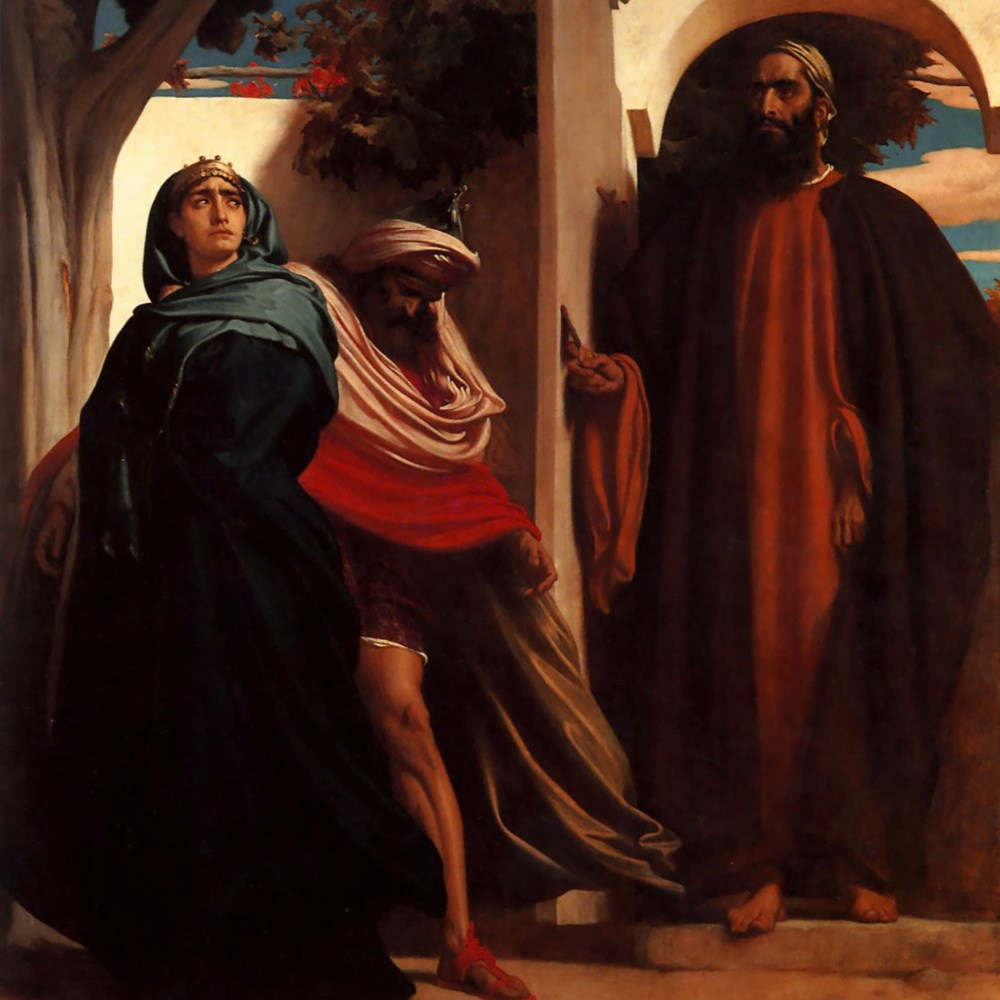
Jezabel and Ahab (c. 1863) by Frederic Leighton

Jezebel is introduced into the biblical narrative as a Phoenician princess, the daughter of Ithobaal I, king of Tyre (1 Kings 16 says she was "Sidonian", which is a biblical term for Phoenicians in general). According to apocryphal genealogies given in Josephus and other classical sources, she was the great-aunt of Dido, Queen of Carthage. As the daughter of Ithobaal I, she was also the sister of Baal-Eser II. Jezebel eventually married King Ahab of Samaria, the northern kingdom of Israel.

Near Eastern scholar Charles R. Krahmalkov proposed that Psalm 45 records the wedding ceremony of Ahab and Jezebel, but other scholars cast doubt on this association. This marriage was the culmination of the friendly relations existing between Israel and Phoenicia during Omri's reign, and possibly cemented important political designs of Ahab. Jezebel, like the foreign wives of Solomon, required facilities for carrying on her form of worship, so Ahab made a Baalist altar in the house of Baal, which he had built in Samaria. Geoffrey Bromiley points out that it was Phoenician practice to install a royal woman as a priestess of Astarte, thus she would have a more active role in temple and palace relations than was customary in the Hebrew monarchy.

=== Elijah ===
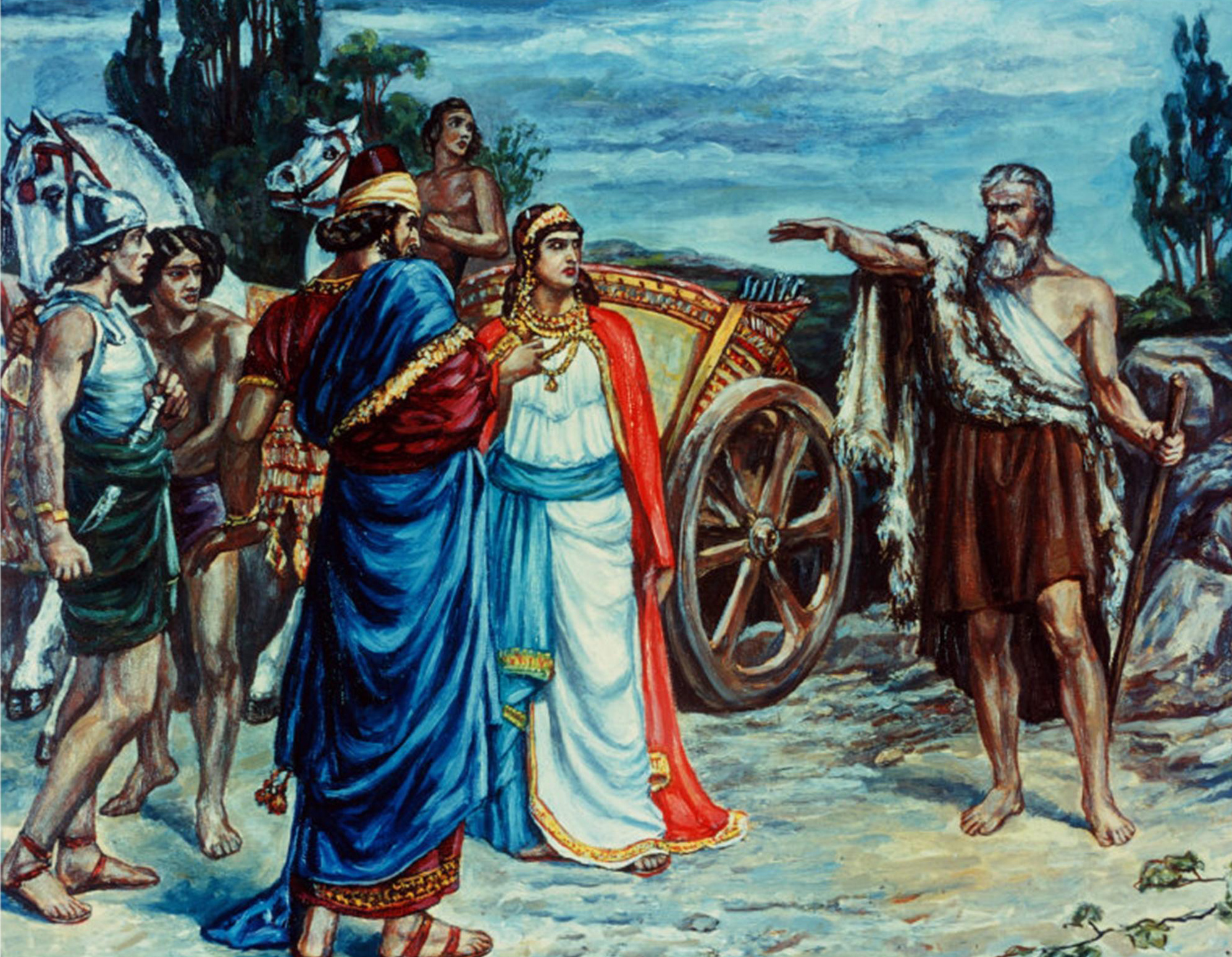
Jezebel and Ahab Meeting Elijah, print by Francis Dicksee

Her coronation as queen upset the balance of power between Yahwism and Baalism. As queen, Jezebel institutionalized Baalism and killed Yahwist prophets, which most likely included the priests of Jeroboam's golden calf cult, and desecrated their altars. Obadiah, a pro-Yahwist figure in Ahab's royal court, secretly protected the survivors of these purges in a cave. Some modern commentators observe that Jezebel's desecration of Yahwist altars would have normally been condoned since they were built outside of Jerusalem, which contravened the Deuteronomic Code. However, they were overlooked due to Elijah's piety or Jezebel's motives. Alternatively, some scholars argue that the Deuteronomic Code promotes laicization and considers all of Israel to be Yahweh's "sacred space". Theologians likewise argue that the "sacred space" is any place where Yahweh "manifested" to humans, according to the Book of Exodus.

As a result, Elijah invited Jezebel's prophets of Baal and Asherah to a challenge at Mount Carmel. The theologian Adam Clarke writing in the early 1800s argued that these prophets would have been royal chaplains and that the Baalist prophets had more jurisdiction over Samaria during Jezebel's reign than the Asherah prophets, who were always indigenous to Samaria. The challenge was to see which god, Yahweh or Baal, would burn a bull sacrifice on an altar. Jezebel's prophets failed to summon Baal in burning the bull sacrifice, despite their cries and cutting themselves. Elijah, however, succeeded when he summoned Yahweh, impressing the Israelites. He then ordered the people to seize and kill the prophets of Baal and Asherah at the Kishon River. In response, Jezebel vows to kill Elijah. Elijah fled to Mount Horeb, where he mourned the apostasy of Israel.

=== Naboth ===
Jezebel was said to have resolved a failed business deal between Ahab and a civilian named Naboth, concerning a vineyard. To do this, she ordered the execution of Naboth and his sons, under false charges of blasphemy against God and the king. Commentators observe that the execution was performed according to the Biblical guidelines so that suspicions of foul play could be minimized. After Naboth's death, his corpse was licked by stray dogs. His execution was criticized by Elijah, who prophesized doom for Jezebel's family as punishment.

=== Death ===
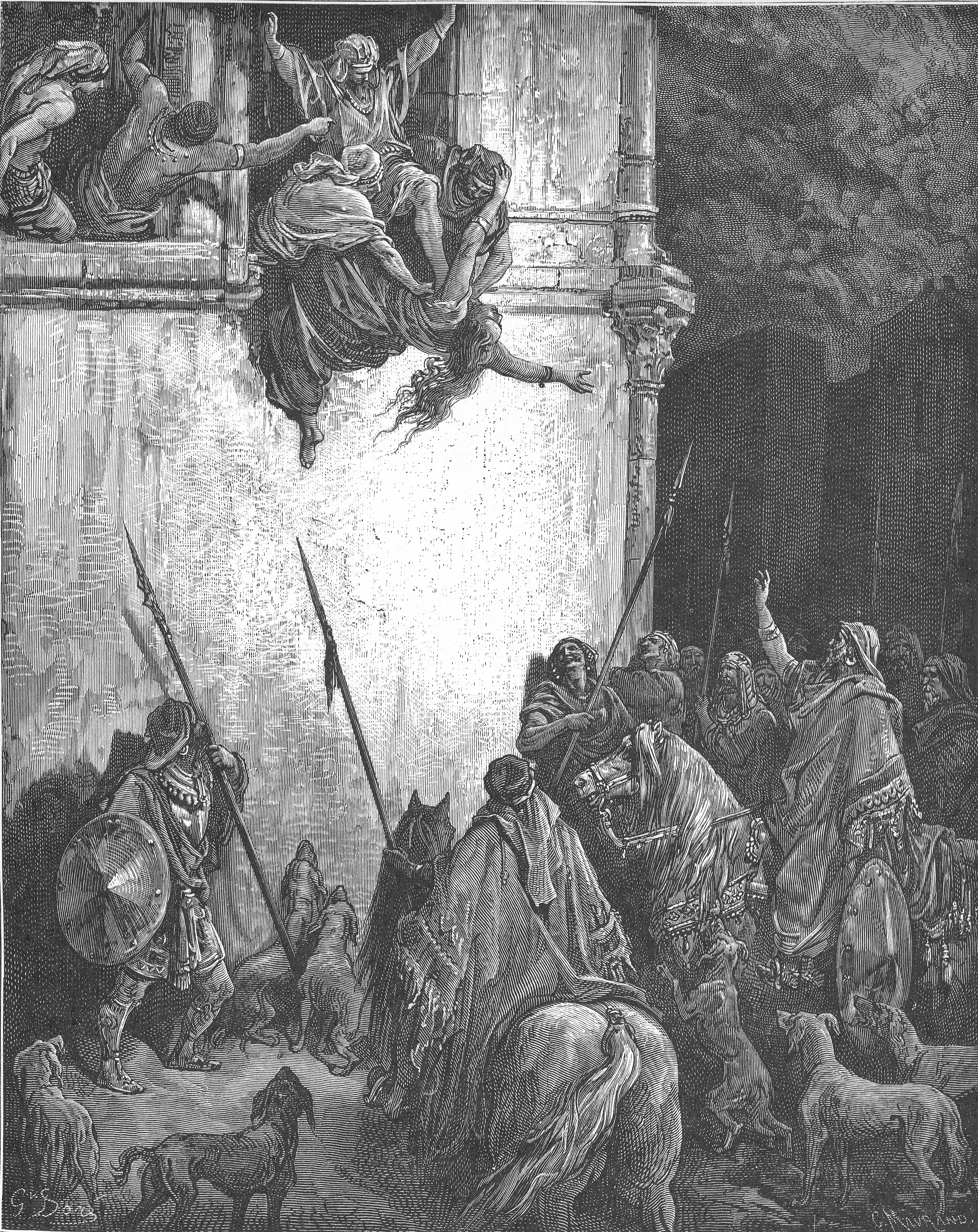
The Death of Jezebel by Gustave Doré

Three years later, Ahab died in battle. Jezebel's son Ahaziah inherited the throne, but died as the result of an accident and was succeeded by his brother, Jehoram. Jehu later usurped the throne and killed Jehoram, and his nephew Ahaziah, who was the son of Jehoram's possible sister Athaliah and her Judahite husband Jehoram. He later approached Jezebel at the royal palace in Jezreel.

Anticipating his arrival, Jezebel put on make-up and a formal wig with adornments and looked out of a window and taunted him. Bromiley says that it should be looked at less as an attempt at seduction and more as the public defiance of the queen mother, invested with the authority of the royal house and cult to confront a rebellious commander. In his two-volume Guide to the Bible (1967 and 1969), Isaac Asimov describes Jezebel's last act: dressing in all her finery, make-up, and jewelry, as deliberately symbolic, indicating her dignity, royal status, and determination to go out of this life as a queen.

Jehu remained unfazed and ordered Jezebel's eunuch servants to throw her from the window. Her blood splattered on the wall and horses, and Jehu's horse trampled her corpse. He entered the palace where, after he ate and drank, ordered Jezebel's body to be taken for burial. However, only her skull, her feet, and the palms of her hands remained—her flesh had been eaten by stray dogs, just as Elijah had prophesied.

== Historicity ==
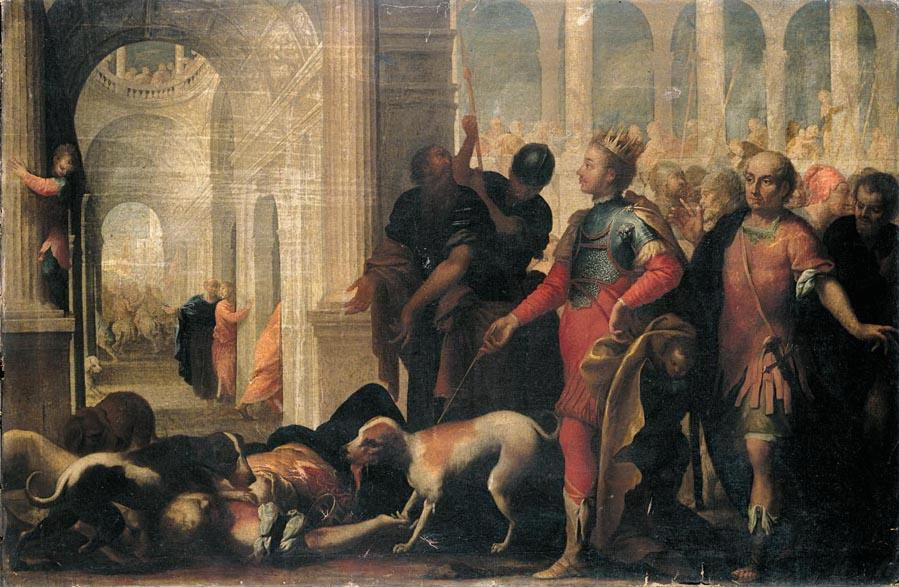
Queen Jezebel Being Punished by Jehu, by Andrea Celesti

According to Israel Finkelstein, the marriage of King Ahab to the daughter of the ruler of the Phoenician empire was a sign of the power and prestige of Ahab and the northern Kingdom of Israel. He termed it a "brilliant stroke of international diplomacy". He says that the inconsistencies and anachronisms in the biblical stories of Jezebel and Ahab mean that they must be considered "more of a historical novel than an accurate historical chronicle". Among these inconsistencies, 1 Kings 20 states that "Ben-Hadad king of Aram" invaded Samaria during Ahab's reign, but this event did not take place until later in the history of Israel, and "Ben-Hadad" was the title of the ruler of Aram-Damascus. Finkelstein also states that the biblical accounts are "obviously influenced by the theology of the seventh century BCE writers". They were hostile to polytheism and viewed Samaria as a rival to Jerusalem.

According to Dr J. Bimson, of Trinity College, Bristol 1 and 2 Kings mix the annals of history with legends, folktales, miracle stories and "fictional constructions", and presentation of earlier sources is heavily edited to fit the Deuteronomist agenda. Janet Howe Gaines likewise finds the narratives implausible, especially the narrative of Naboth being betrayed by an entire Israelite town. But Christian Frevel argues that the biblical narrative subtly alludes to the Omrides' historical role in introducing Yahwism to Judah, which was obfuscated by anti-Omride Judeans. For example, Ahab gave his children theophoric names during his years of expansion in the northern territories and Judah. Other scholars propose that the Baal worshipped by Ahab and Jezebel was the "YHWH of Samaria", which was opposed as Yahwist heresy by the Judean priests, but some disagree based on archaeological evidence and extrabiblical records on Jezebel's upbringing. Brian R. Doak believes the narratives are historically plausible because of the historicity of Omri and Ahab, evidence for widespread paganism among Israelites, international marriages for political purposes and competition between religious professionals during periods of "political unrest or social change". In addition, other contemporary sources, including sources written by Phoenicians, face similar issues in terms of being unverified by third-party sources.

A seal from the 9th century BCE, discovered in 1964, has a partially damaged inscription of "YZBL" which could have once read, "belonging to Jezebel". However, there are some issues with this theory. Whereas on the seal it appears the inscription begins with the letter yodh, Jezebel's name starts with an aleph, which is lacking on the seal; furthermore, the possessive lamedh which would translate to the predicate "belonging to ..." is also missing from the seal. However, it is entirely possible these letters simply could have been located where the seal is now damaged. The seal includes motifs associated with both Egyptian and Israelite royalty, such as the Uraeus cobra, which is commonly found on pharaonic artifacts, and symbols such as the winged sun and ankh, which are found on numerous other Israelite royal seals from the 8th century BCE and onwards. Regardless, scholars do not agree on whether the seal is evidence for the historicity of the biblical character. Some scholars have said that the size and intricacy of the seal could mean it was used by royalty. If the seal truly represents Jezebel, then she most likely represented 'Anat as queen, who was the wife of the Ugaritic Baal. This aligns with Phoenician royal tradition.

== Cultural symbol ==
According to Geoffrey Bromiley, the depiction of Jezebel as "the incarnation of Canaanite cultic and political practices, detested by Israelite prophets and loyalists, has given her a literary life far beyond the existence of a ninth-century Tyrian princess."

Through the centuries, the name Jezebel came to be associated with false prophets. By the early 20th century, it was also associated with fallen or abandoned women. By the 1950s and 1960s, the figures of Jezebel in 1 and 2 Kings and the Jezebel of Revelation began to be conflated and became "a trope for women". In Christian lore, a comparison to Jezebel suggested that a person was a pagan or an apostate masquerading as a servant of God. By manipulation and seduction, she misled the saints of God into sins of idolatry and sexual immorality. In particular, Christians associated Jezebel with promiscuity and the usurpation of male authority. The cosmetics which Jezebel applied before her death also led some Christians to associate makeup with vice, although, as Isaac Asimov points out in his Guide to the Bible, such cosmetics—used on ceremonial occasions by royalty and priestesses—could be interpreted as the desire of a proud woman to meet her last moments in a manner and attire becoming a Queen. In the Middle Ages, the chronicler Matthew Paris criticised Isabella of Angoulême, the queen consort of John, King of England, by writing that she was "more Jezebel than Isabel". In contemporary usage, the name of Jezebel is sometimes invoked as a synonym for sexually promiscuous or controlling women.

In feminist interpretations and Bible scholarship, Jezebel is re-examined and, for example, seen as unfairly framed or her story altered, or as a resource for womanist theology. Intersectional feminists have often regarded Jezebel as the basis for an oppressive stereotype that was used as a justification for sexual assault and sexual servitude during the eras of colonization and slavery in the United States.

== Jezebel spirit ==
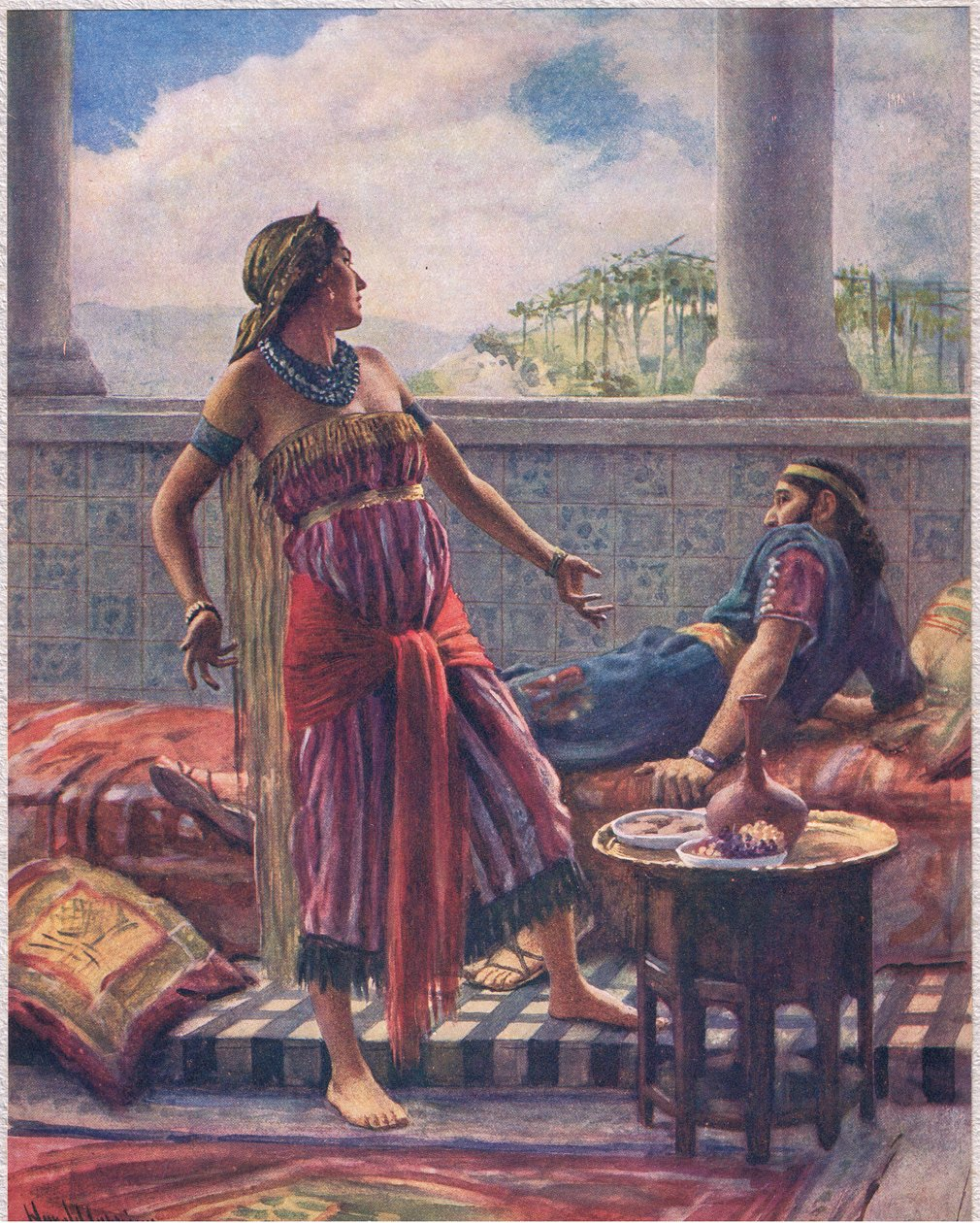
Jezebel by Harold Copping

In American Christian spiritual warfare contexts, particularly popular among neo-Charismatic groups such as the New Apostolic Reformation (NAR), the Jezebel spirit is considered one of multiple named demons or territorial spirits and is "near [ubiquitous] in spiritual warfare literature". It is a powerful demon representing an "apocalyptic threat to American life, one whose demonic reign [is] hastening US moral decline and who thus [has] to be both guarded against and dethroned and replaced, spiritually and politically, if the nation [is] to evade divine judgement". "The story of Jezebel so permeates NAR culture", states religion journalist Frederick Clarkson, that prophetic art has been made by one of the movement's apostles "depicting the scene when she's devoured by dogs." In 2016, the senior editor of Charisma magazine claimed that the 2016 US presidential election removed the spirit of Jezebel present in the government. NAR apostles and prophets have used the term in reference to American politics. NAR apostle Lance Wallnau has stated US Vice President Kamala Harris is guided by an "occult spirit", the Spirit of Jezebel"; NAR pastor Ché Ahn prayed at a January 5, 2021 rally that the Jezebel spirit upon the 2020 US presidential election would be thrown out to allow Christians to "rule and reign through President Trump". Ahn has also invoked Jezebel in reference to Harris, decreeing that she would be "cast out" by Trump in 2024, who he sees as a Jehu figure, and "lose in Jesus's name". The politically violent implications of such messaging, and lack of significant media coverage, have been criticized by Clarkson and others. In 2024, Micah Beckwith, then a candidate for, and later the lieutenant governor of the US state of Indiana referred to the race as being between Republican "strength and godly boldness" and the "Jezebel spirit". Others who have been identified with the demonic Jezebel spirit include singer Madonna. In 2024, pastor Mark Driscoll criticized the James River Church Stronger Men's Conference for being opened by "the Jezebel spirit" following a sword-swallowing act.

== In popular culture ==
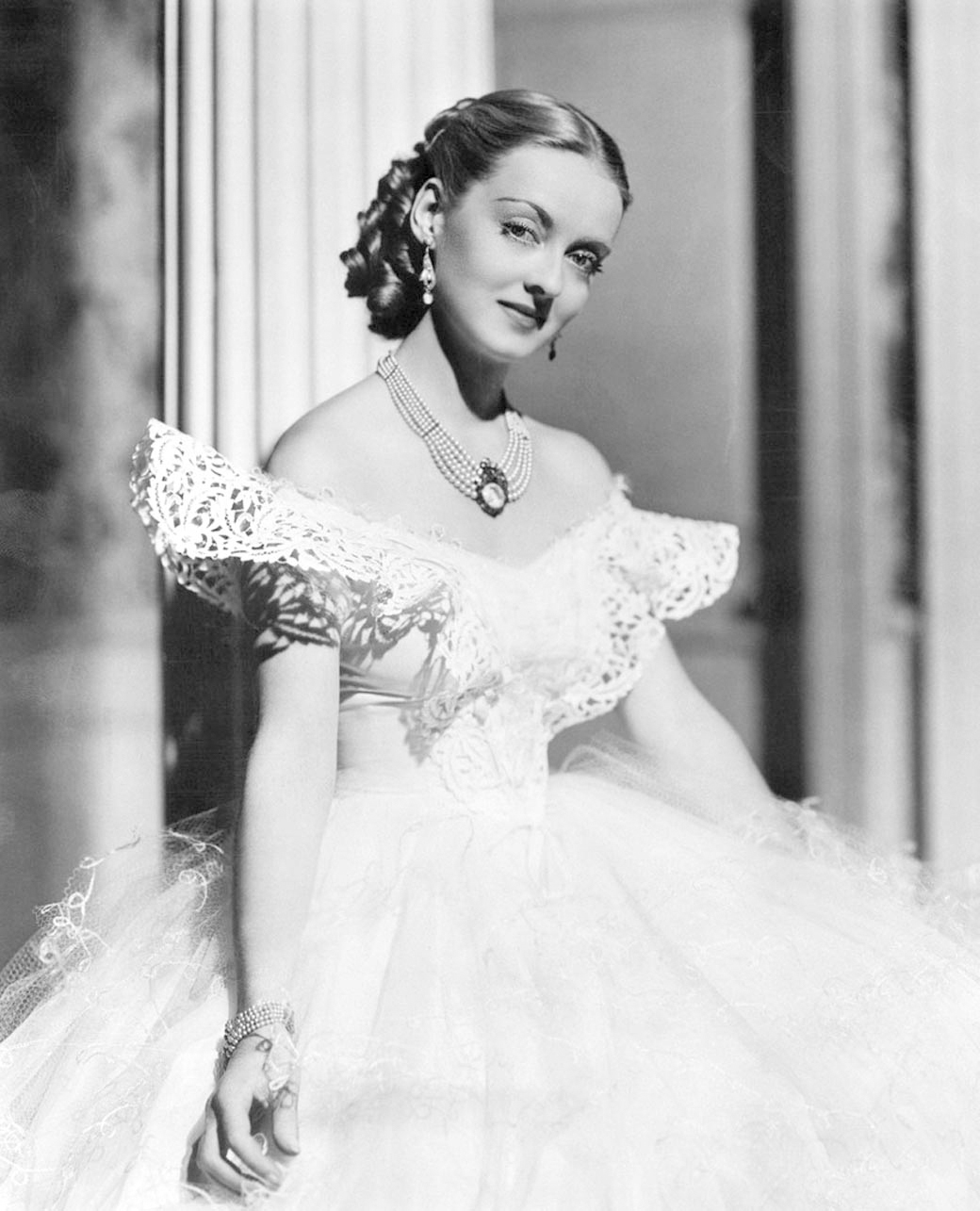
Bette Davis as Julie in the film Jezebel

Bette Davis and Henry Fonda starred in the 1938 romantic drama Jezebel.

Gene Loves Jezebel are a British rock band formed in the early 1980s by twin brothers Michael Aston and Jay Aston, initially associated with gothic rock and post-punk.

The American gospel vocal group Golden Gate Quartet released a single called "Jezebel" in 1941 which narrates the story of Jezebel.

Frankie Laine recorded "Jezebel" (1951), written by Wayne Shanklin, which became a hit song. The song begins:

If ever the Devil was born without a pair of horns
It was you, Jezebel, it was you
If ever an angel fell
Jezebel, it was you, Jezebel, it was you!

Paulette Goddard starred as Jezebel in the film Sins of Jezebel (1953).

David Byrne and Brian Eno's 1981 album My Life in the Bush of Ghosts includes the song "The Jezebel Spirit", featuring clips of the exorcism of a Jezebel spirit.

English band Sade's 1985 album Promise includes a song titled "Jezebel".

The Natalie Merchant song "Jezebel" was released on the 10,000 Maniacs 1992 album Our Time in Eden and later performed acoustically on the 1993 live album MTV Unplugged (10,000 Maniacs album).

The 1995 KMFDM song "Juke Joint Jezebel" is the band's most well-known song with around three million copies sold.

In 2000, the Puerto Rican pop singer Ricky Martin released his song, "Jezabel" [sic], on his sixth studio album, Sound Loaded. The song is about a character who seduces famous men and then sells the story to paparazzi.

British electronic music project Recoil's 2000 album Liquid includes a song titled "Jezebel".

The popular historian Lesley Hazleton wrote a revisionist account, Jezebel: The Untold Story of the Bible's Harlot Queen (2004), presenting Jezebel as a sophisticated queen engaged in mortal combat with the fundamentalist prophet Elijah.

Iron & Wine included a song "Jezebel" on his 2005 EP Woman King. It contains many references to the biblical Jezebel, in particular the dogs associated with her death.

The Jezabels is an Australian indie rock band founded in 2007. The band's name is based on the biblical character, whom one band member describes as "misunderstood or misrepresented" and "an example of how women are really wrongly presented".

=== In literature ===
- Barnard, Megan (2023). Jezebel. Penguin Random House.
- Beach, Eleanor Ferris (2005). The Jezebel Letters: religion and politics in ninth-century Israel. Fortress Press.
- Bellis, Alice Ogden (2007). Helpmates, harlots, and heroes: Women's stories in the Hebrew Bible. Westminster John Knox Press.
- Everhart, Janet S. (2010). "Jezebel: Framed by eunuchs?" The Catholic Biblical Quarterly 72, no. 4: 688-698.
- Garrett, Ginger (2013). Reign: The Chronicles of Queen Jezebel, Book #3 in the Lost Loves of the Bible Series. ISBN 143-4-7659-62
- Hazleton, Lesley (2009). Jezebel: The Untold Story of the Bible's Harlot Queen
- Jackson, Melissa (2015). "Reading Jezebel from the 'Other' Side: Feminist Critique, Postcolonialism, and Comedy". Review & Expositor 112, no. 2: 239-255.
- Lomax, Tamura (2018). Jezebel unhinged: Loosing the Black Female Body in religion and culture. Duke University Press,.
- Mokoena, Lerato (2021). "Reclaiming Jezebel and Mrs Job: Challenging Sexist Cultural Stereotypes and the Curse of Invisibility" in Transgression and transformation: Feminist, postcolonial and queer Biblical interpretation as creative interventions.
- Moran, Michelle (2003). Die Phönizierin, München: Wilhelm Goldmann Verlag (Random House Group). (Original title Jezebel). ISBN 3-442-35775-6
- Quick, Catherine S. (1993). "Jezebel's last laugh: the rhetoric of wicked women." Women and Language 16, no. 1: 44-49.
- Snyder, J. B. (2012). "Jezebel and her Interpreters". Women's Bible Commentary: Twentieth–Anniversary Edition. Louisville, KY. pp. 180–183.
- Wyatt, Stephanie (2012). "Jezebel, Elijah, and the widow of Zarephath: A ménage à trois that estranges the holy and makes the holy the strange". Journal for the Study of the Old Testament 36, no. 4: 435-458.
- Atwood, Margaret (1985). The Handmaid’s Tale. McClelland and Stewart.
