= Menander of Ephesus =

Ancient historian cited by Josephus

Menander of Ephesus (Ancient Greek: Μένανδρος; fl. c. early 2nd century BC) was the historian whose lost work on the history of Tyre was used by Josephus, who quotes Menander's list of kings of Tyre in his apologia for the Jews, Against Apion (1.18).

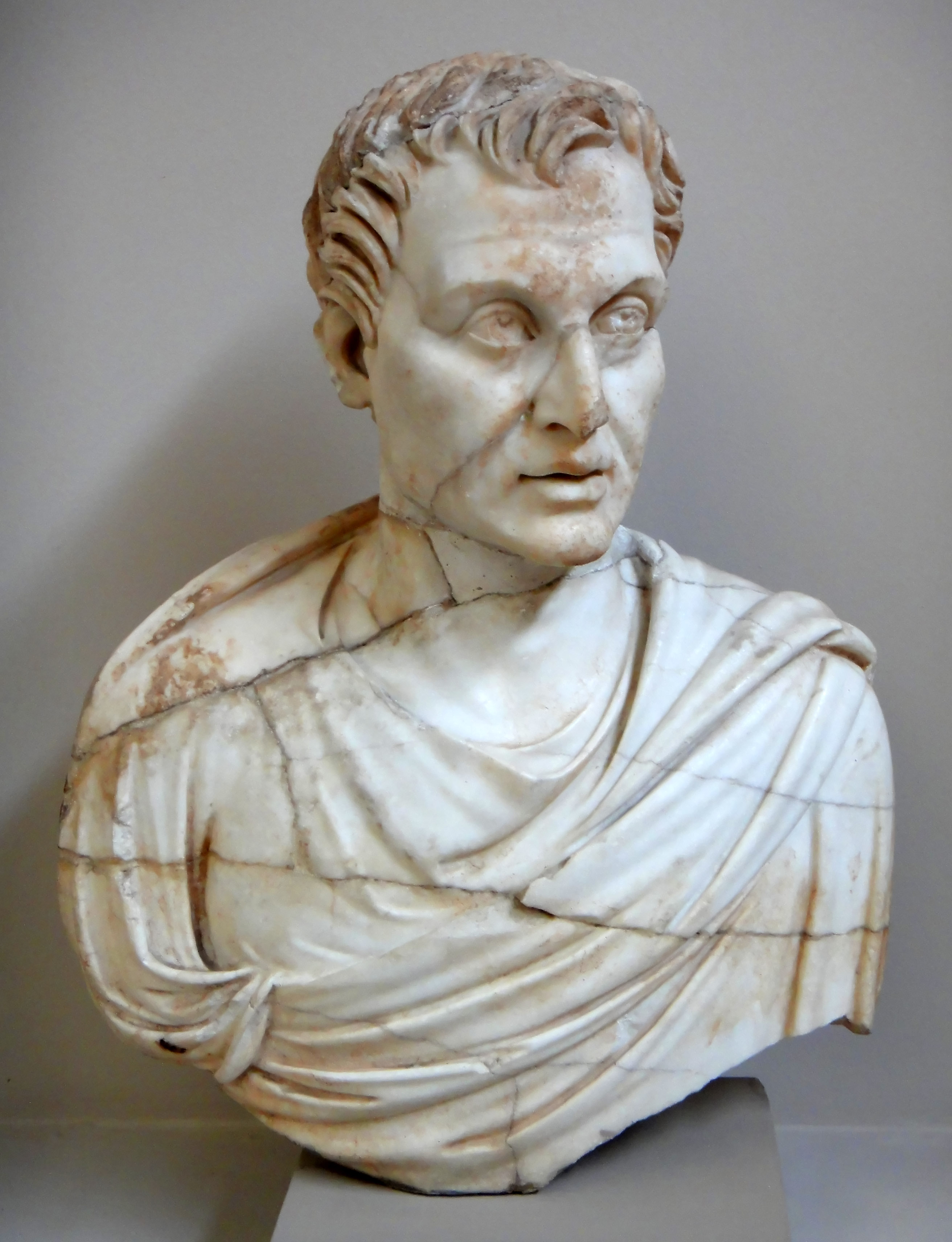
Bust of Menander, housed in the Ephesus Archaeological Museum in Selçuk, Turkey

"This Menander wrote the Acts that were done both by the Greeks and Barbarians, under every one of the Tyrian kings, and had taken much pains to learn their history out of their own records." All records having been lost, this second-hand report is the basis for the traditional king-list. Menander, living in a city with a considerable population of Hellenized Jews, also seems to have written on the history of the Jews, often cited by Josephus.

== Sources ==
The only extant sources for the writing of Menander are citations of his work found in Josephus's two works Antiquities of the Jews and Against Apion, or in extracts from Josephus's works found in later writers. These later writers were Theophilus of Antioch, Eusebius of Caesarea, and George Syncellus. William Barnes lists the following sources that scholars use to reconstruct the text of Menander:

- Codex Laurentianus, 10th or 11th centuries AD, has the earliest Greek manuscript for Against Apion, but Barnes (p. 70) says it is "faulty in many respects."
- There is an Old Latin version of Josephus's citations of Menander in the writings of Cassiodorus.
- Menander's list of kings from Abibaal, father of Hiram I, to Pygmalion, as taken from Against Apion 1.18, is found in the "To Autolycus" of Theophilus of Antioch.
- All Greek manuscripts of Eusebius's Chronography have been lost, but an Armenian translation has virtually the entire text.
- Fragments of Eusebius's Chronography are found in later Greek writers.
- Greek excerpts from the Chronography are found in Syncellus.

== Contents of surviving extracts of Menander ==
The exact title borne by Menander's lost work is not made clear by Josephus, who gives the following descriptions when he cites Menander: "Menander also, one who translated the Tyrian archives out of the dialect of the Phoenicians into the Greek language" (Ant. 8.5.3). "Menander attests to it, who, when he wrote his Chronology, and translated the Archives of Tyre into the Greek language" (Ant. 9.14.2). "Menander wrote the Acts that were done both by the Greeks and Barbarians, under every one of the Tyrian Kings" (Against Apion 1.18).

Josephus only cited Menander as a means to authenticate themes of his own writings. One such theme was the antiquity of the Jewish people, for which Josephus summoned Menander and several other non-Jewish historians to support his case. In terms of chronology, the earliest event to which Josephus calls Menander as his witness is the reign of Solomon. In Ant. 8.5.3, Josephus describes the help that Hiram, king of Tyre, provided for the building of Solomon's Temple. A description of Hiram's building projects in Tyre is then quoted from Menander in order to show the historicity of the Hiram mentioned in the Bible. A few other details about Hiram are added, including an exchange of riddles between Solomon and Hiram. In Ant. 8.13.2, the drought in Israel in the days of Elijah (1 Kings 17 and 18) is equated, by Josephus, with a drought that Menander said occurred in the days of Ethbaal (Ithobaal I, 878–847 BC), king of the Tyrians. In Ant. 9.14.2, after relating that Shalmaneser V was responsible for the destruction of Samaria (2 Kings 17:3–6), Menander is cited as bearing witness to the existence of Shalmaneser. Here Menander says that the king of Tyre during this time was named Eluleus, who reigned 36 years, and who successfully endured a siege of five years started by Shalmaneser.

To historians, the most interesting portion of Menander's writing that has been preserved in Against Apion 1.18. Here Josephus again demonstrates the antiquity of his nation, as attested by historians outside his own national tradition. Bringing up Solomon and his contemporary Hiram, Josephus cites Menander's list of the kings of Tyre from Abibalus (Abibaal), father of Hiram, down to Pygmalion, with the years of reign of each king, as well as the years of their life. For Pygmalion, it is related that "he lived fifty-eight years and reigned forty-seven. It was in the seventh year of his reign that his sister took flight, and built the city of Carthage in Libya." After ending his quotation from Menander with this sentence, Josephus summarizes Menander's list of kings as follows:

The whole period from the accession of Hirom (Hiram) to the foundation of Carthage thus amounts to 155 years and eight months; and, since the temple at Jerusalem was built in the twelfth year of King Hirom's reign, 143 years and eight months elapsed between the erection of the temple and the foundation of Carthage.

For a discussion of the importance of this passage in establishing the chronology of the kings of Tyre, see below, and also the Pygmalion and Hiram articles.

== Modern evaluations of Menander's writings ==
=== Evaluations based on literary analysis ===
Some modern historians have considered Josephus's ostensible citations of Menander from a literary-analysis standpoint. The important question that they were addressing was whether Josephus's quotations were just that, or were another example of his putting his own ideas and words into someone else's mouth (pen). Josephus was frequently bold to do just this, notably in cases such as when a general, addressing his troops, provided an opportunity for Josephus to display his own eloquence. However, three lines of evidence indicate that this was not the case with the texts purporting to come from Menander. The first line of evidence is literary.

Dius [another Hellenistic historian cited by Josephus] calls Solomon "the sovereign of Jerusalem" (ho turannos Ierosolumon) while Menander refers to him as "the king of Jerusalem" (ho Ierosolumon basileus). This appellation is clear proof of the Tyrian source of these passages, for the kings of the Phoenician coast, who ruled principally over one city, looked upon Solomon as a monarch of a city, like themselves; nor did Josephus correct this "flaw", even in an account where he endeavors to exalt the greatness of Solomon. Great weight must be attached to the testimony of Dius and Menander as cited by Josephus, for these are the only mentions of Solomon's name in a foreign source—perhaps a Tyrian source that stems from the time of Solomon himself!

The author of this passage, Jacob Katzenstein, makes two other comments that suggest that Josephus was not merely putting forth his own writing and ideas under Menander's name:

The regnal years and the life-spans of the rulers are not given in round numbers, so there is no reason to doubt the veracity of this tradition. Moreover, Josephus does not digress from listing the kings of Tyre even to comment on Ethbaal (Ithobal), the father-in-law of Ahab, although he is mentioned in the Bible.

Commenting further on the form in which Josephus presents the years of the kings in the Against Apion passage, William Barnes writes:

Indeed, the numbers appear to be taken directly from some sort of formulaic archival source or king list, which gave only the life span and regnal total for each king of Tyre plus brief remarks pertaining to his dynastic status (cf. the seemingly superfluous retention [at least for Josephus' purposes] of the numbers for the life spans of the various kings).

The literary conventions mentioned by these historians have therefore led them to the position that Menander's actual words, not just Josephus's own ideas, are to be found in the various texts where Josephus says he is citing Menander.

=== Evaluations based on inscriptional evidence ===
Josephus's citations of Menander contain references to Shalmaneser (V), Sennacherib, and Esarhaddon, kings of Assyria that are well known both from Biblical texts and also from numerous Assyrian inscriptions. More important, however, for the question of the historicity of the Menander texts is his mention of kings who were not so famous, especially those for whom there had been no evidence outside Menander until fairly recent times.

- In Against Apion 1.18, Menander names Balazeros as the grandfather of Pygmalion. Frank Moore Cross and other scholars have equated this Balazeros (Baal-Eser II) with (Ba‘l-mazzer) who gave tribute to Shalmaneser III in 841 BC (see the Baal-Eser II article for details).
- Against Apion 1.18 also mentions Pygmalion as a ruler of Tyre, relating that his sister Dido fled from him in his seventh year, 155 years after the beginning of the reign of Hiram I. A 9th-century BC inscription found on Sardinia apparently names Pygmalion, as described in the Pygmalion article.
- In Ant. 9.14.2, Menander, as cited by Josephus, mentions Eluleus as refusing to pay tribute to Sennacherib (725–722 BC), whereupon the Assyrians unsuccessfully besieged Tyre for five years. The conflict of Sennacherib with "Luli", king of Tyre, is corroborated by at least three inscriptions of the Assyrian monarch. Historians generally equate the name "Luli", in Sennacherib's Akkadian, with the Greek form Eluleus.

These inscriptional evidences for lesser-known kings not mentioned in the Hebrew Bible have therefore been taken as lending credence to Menander's writings. For each of them, the time frame that Menander assigns to them is in agreement with the time assigned to their inscriptional evidence by modern historians.

=== Evaluations based on the time from Hiram to Pygmalion ===
As cited above from Ant. 1.18, Menander gave 155 years from the first year of Hiram's reign until the seventh year of Pygmalion, at which time Pygmalion's sister Dido, also known as Elissa, fled from Tyre, after which she founded Carthage in North Africa. This reference in Menander is unique not only for its chronological correlation of the time between Hiram and Pygmalion, but also because virtually all texts of Josephus/Menander that have come down to us, including the citations of Josephus's work in other writers, have preserved this total of 143 years and eight months from the start of construction of Solomon's Temple, in the 12th year of the reign of Hiram (Against Apion 1.18/126), until Dido's flight. This is in contrast with the lengths of reign for the individual monarchs between Hiram and Pygmalion, for which there is considerable variance in the copies of the various texts. But the overall figure of 143 years has been preserved by a fortuitous circumstance: it is repeated in three instances in Josephus, and in one of these instances it is not given as simply 143 years, but as 155 years from the start of Hiram's reign until the time that construction began for the Temple, which was in Hiram's 12th year (Against Apion 1.17,18). This triple redundancy has preserved the total of years from Hiram to Dido as originally recorded, even though the various extracts of Menander found in Josephus, Eusebius, Syncellus, and Theodotion disagree in other matters, due to the error of copyists through the centuries of written transmission. Modern historians therefore have generally given considerable credibility to this figure, using it to measure back 155 years from the date for the founding of Carthage in order to arrive at the regnal years of Hiram.

==== Menander's date for construction of Temple ====
The problem with this calculation, however, lay in determining which date to use for the founding of Carthage. Here, classical authors gave two years: 825 BC as given by Pompeius Trogus, or 814 BC as given by Timaeus. Although earlier historians generally preferred the 814 date, the publication of an inscription of Shalmaneser III relating the receipt of tribute from Ba’li-manzer of Tyre (apparently Baal-Eser II, grandfather of Pygmalion) in 841 BC has caused many scholars such as Frank M. Cross to favor the 825 date, because that date was consistent with the best texts of Menander for the reign lengths of Baal-Eser and his son Mattan I, whereas the 814 date was in conflict with these texts. Joachim Peñuela has argued that the 825 BC date of Pompeius Trogus and the 814 BC date of Timaeus and other writers are both correct when properly understood. Based on a citation from Strabo (17.3.14–15) plus a fragmentary ancient Greek text describing Dido's various time-consuming activities after she left Tyre but before the people of North Africa granted her permission to build a city, Peñuela contends that eleven years elapsed between her flight and the foundation (or possibly, dedication) of the city, thus explaining the apparent discrepancy between Trogus and Timaeus in this matter. For a fuller discussion, see the Pygmalion article.

Accepting that 825 BC was Pygmalion's seventh year and the ending point of the 155 years, Hiram's first year becomes 825 + 155 = 980 BC. His twelfth year, the year in which Temple construction began, would then be 968 BC. There is some slight uncertainty here because neither Josephus, Menander, or Pompeius Trogus, in the texts that have come down to us, relate which calendar they were using for reckoning the years: Roman, Macedonian, or Phoenician. But this consideration would not make a difference of more than a year or two, so that Barnes states,

[F]or the present we may conclude quite confidently that the Tyrian king list of Menander as preserved in Josephus' Contra Apionem [Latin for Against Apion], 1:117-26, coupled with the dated reference in Shalmaneser's annals to the Tyrian king Ba'li-manzer and the date of Pompeius Trogus for the founding of Carthage, provide a firm external synchronism for biblical chronology, and particularly for the dating of the founding of Solomon's temple in 968 (the twelfth year of Hiram of Tyre), as well as the dating of Solomon's accession to 971. A variation of a year or two is possible, of course, especially in the light of our ignorance of Phoenician dating practices, but I seriously doubt that an error of more than two years either way is likely.

==== Biblical date for construction of Temple ====
First Kings 6:1 says that Temple construction began in the spring month of Ziv (Iyyar in the modern Jewish calendar) in the fourth year of the reign of Solomon. Assigning a date to this in modern terms depends on determining a date for the death of Solomon and the subsequent division of the kingdom. The date of the division of the kingdom was calculated by Edwin Thiele as occurring some time between the first of Nisan (roughly April) of 931 BC and the day before Nisan 1 of 930 BC. Thiele's logic in this matter was based on fixed dates for the presence of Ahab at the Battle of Qarqar in 853 BC and Jehu's tribute to Shalmaneser III in 841 BC. Thiele showed that when non-accession years were assumed for the northern kingdom of Israel and accession years were assumed for the southern kingdom (Judah), the regnal lengths of both kingdoms, as measured back from the Battle of Qarqar, produced the same result of 931 BC for the first year of the divided kingdom. Furthermore, the extensive cross-synchronisms between the two kingdoms for these 78 years all worked out exactly, giving extra support for the credibility of the Biblical records that allowed this calculation of 931/930 for the division of the kingdom. Thiele's logic in this matter has been acknowledged by a broad spectrum of historians of the Bible and the ancient Near East, and is accepted in the Cambridge Ancient History and in much of recent scholarship.

Thiele established that the southern kingdom of Judah measured its regnal years from the fall month of Tishri, the month in which Rosh Hashanah, the Jewish New Year, continues to be celebrated in modern times. Thiele's logic for determining the year of the division of the kingdom was built on reckoning in Nisan-based years, such as were used in the northern kingdom of Israel. Solomon's 40th or last year, then, since it was reckoned according to a Tishri-based year, could have begun in either Tishri of 932 or Tishri of 931 BC. Thiele assumed the latter, which led him into conflicts with the later reigns of Ahaziah and Athaliah that he never resolved. These conflicts disappear when it is assumed that Solomon's 40th year began in Tishri of 932. Leslie McFall, a foremost interpreter of Thiele's work, now accepts the results of a 2003 study by Rodger Young demonstrating that the Biblical data require that Solomon's last year began in Tishri of 932 BC instead of Tishri of 931 as given by Thiele. F. M. Cross and his student Wm. H. Barnes had also arrived at the date of 968/67 BC for the beginning of construction of the Temple, based solely on the Tyrian data of Menander. Unknown to Moore and Barnes, in the 1920s the Belgian scholar Valerius Coucke had likewise deduced that construction on Solomon's Temple began in 968/67 BC, based on the same Tyrian data used by Moore and Barnes, but also utilizing information from the Parian Marble and other classical sources to confirm and refine this date.

These chronological considerations date Solomon's fourth year as beginning in the fall of 968 BC, so that Temple construction began in the following spring, 967 BC. This is an additional demonstration of the trustworthiness that can be assigned to Josephus's citations of Menander, whose writings were used by the scholars listed above to date the beginning of Temple construction in 968/67 BC. In particular, it authenticates the 155 years measured back from Dido's flight to the start of the reign of Hiram, since the method of determining the date for the start of construction of Solomon's Temple as derived from Menander of Ephesus is "wholly independent" of the means of deriving this date from the Biblical data. For many modern scholars, the agreement of these two methods, exact within one year, has caused a new appreciation of the works of the ancient historian Menander, as preserved in the writings of Josephus.

== See also ==
- List of Kings of Tyre
- Hiram I
- Pygmalion
- Dido (Queen of Carthage)
