= Pedra da Gávea =

Mountain in Brazil

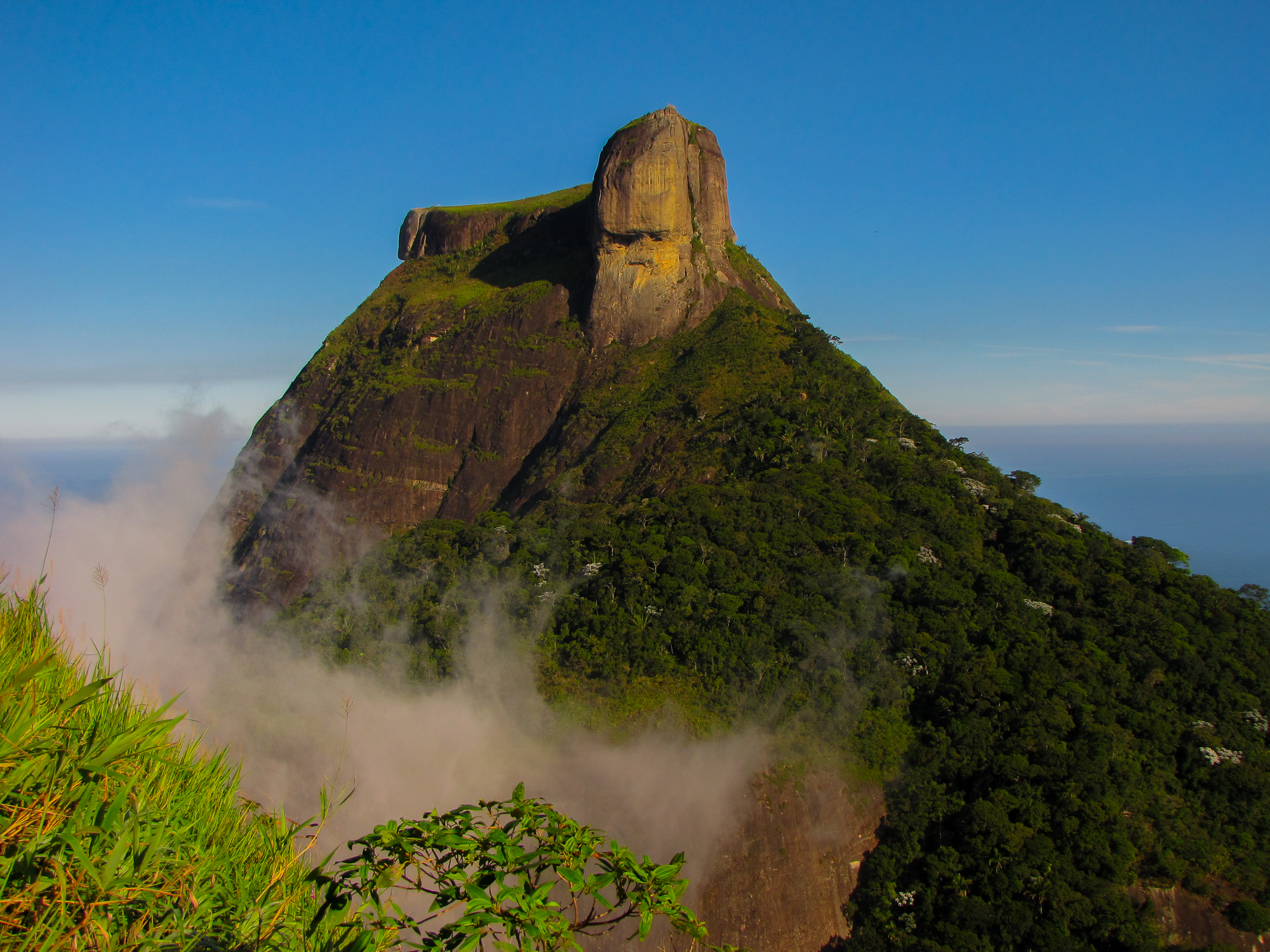

Highest point
- Elevation: 844 m (2,769 ft)
- Coordinates: 22°59′47″S 43°16′55″W

Geography
- Location within Brazil
- Location: Tijuca Forest, Barra da Tijuca, Rio de Janeiro
- Parent range: Tijuca

Pedra da Gávea is a monolithic mountain in Tijuca Forest, Rio de Janeiro, Brazil. Composed of granite and gneiss, its elevation is 844 metres (2,769 ft), making it one of the highest mountains in the world that ends directly in the ocean. Trails on the mountain were opened up by the local farming population in the early 19th century; today, the site is under the administration of the Tijuca National Park.

The mountain's name translates as Rock of the Topsail, and was given to it during the expedition of Captain Gaspar de Lemos, begun in 1501, and in which the Rio de Janeiro bay (today Guanabara Bay, but after which the city was named) also received its name. The mountain, one of the first in Brazil to be named in Portuguese, was named by the expedition's sailors, who compared its silhouette to that of the shape of a topsail of a carrack upon sighting it on January 1, 1502. That name in turn came to be given to the Gávea area of the city of Rio de Janeiro.

Differential weathering on one side of the rock has created what is described as a stylized human face. Markings on another face of the rock have been described as an inscription. Geologists and scientists are nearly in agreement that the "inscription" is the result of erosion and that the "face" is a product of pareidolia. Furthermore, the consensus of archaeologists and scholars in Brazil is that the mountain should not be viewed as an archaeological site.

== Geology and ecology ==
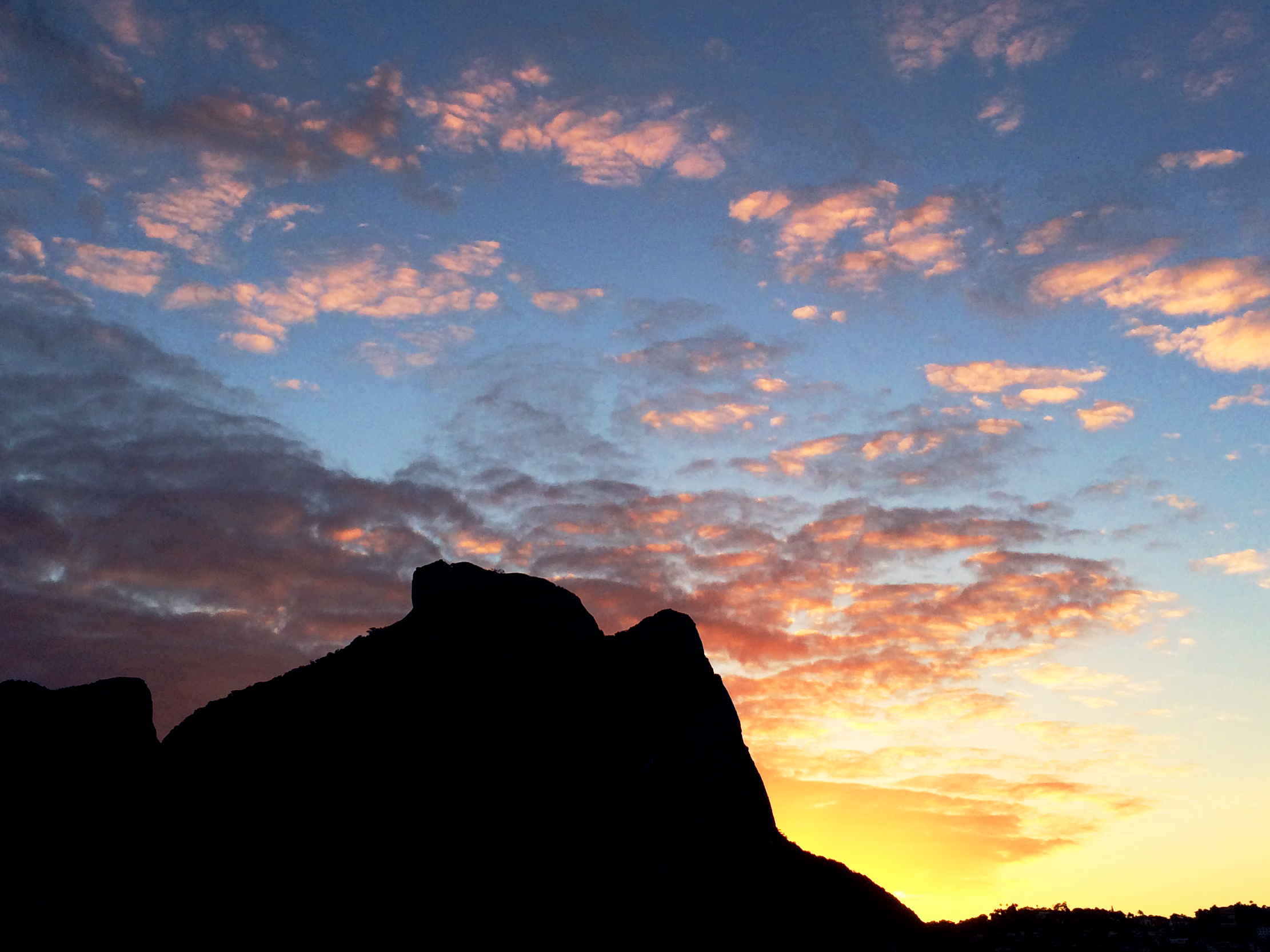
Stone of Gávea at dawn

Located in the Tijuca Range, Pedra da Gávea is 842 m (2,762 ft) tall, and is a granite dome. The flat top of the mountain is capped with a 150 m tall layer of granite, whereas underneath, the mound is made up of gneiss. The former dates to around 450 million years ago, whereas the latter dates to 600 million years. The mountain, much like other stone outcroppings in and around the area, is the result of younger Neoproterozoic granitoid rocks and thin Cretaceous diabase dikes intruding the older Meso-Neoproterozoic high-grade metasedimentary rocks.

The contact zone between the upper granite and the lower gneiss is both sub-horizontal and semi-gradual, and the gneissic xenoliths have a tabular form, which heavily suggests that they were captured from a magma chamber's floor by thermal detachment. It has been suggested that Pedra da Gávea "correspond[s] to the bottom of a granitic magma chamber and the original thickness of the granitic body was much larger than the present exposure." The granitic body of the Pedra da Gávea could also correspond to the eastern extension of the nearby Pedra Branca Granite Massif, according to Akihisa Motoki et al.

Differential weathering incised the northern side of the mountain, producing cavities underneath the granite dome. The abrupt dome itself is the result of the more durable granite having resisted the aforementioned weathering more so than the softer gneiss. Furthermore, erosion has worn etches into the mountain's sides.

The mountain is covered in lemon, orange, breadfruit, banana, and papaya trees, as well as cannas and roses.

== Archaeological interest ==
There is a purported inscription carved into the rockface, which some claim is in Phoenician, a Semitic language known to modern scholars only from inscriptions. According to Paul Herrmann in his book Conquests by Man, the inscription on the mountain had been known for quite some time, but had merely been attributed to "some unknown prehistoric American people". Closer examination, however, led some researchers to believe it was of Phoenician origin. Today, however, most researchers suggest that the inscription and "face" are merely the results of erosion. In the mid-1950s, the Brazilian Ministry of Education and Health denied that the site featured any writing, declaring "that examination by geologists had proved it to be nothing more than the effect of weather erosion which happened to look like an inscription." Brazilian archaeologists and scholars have adopted a negative attitude toward the treatment of the site, with Herrmann noting that "Brazilian archaeology denies altogether the existence of Phoenician inscription in any part of the country whatsoever."

== See also ==
- Geography of Brazil
- Pareidolia
- Serra dos Órgãos
- Sugarloaf Mountain and Urca Hill Natural Monument

== Bibliography ==
- Fanthorpe, Lionel; Patricia Fanthorpe (2004). Unsolved Mysteries of the Sea. Dundurn Press. ISBN 9781554880362.
- Glover, Mark, ed. (1977). The Mormon Church in Latin America: A Periodical Index (1830–1976). Harold B. Lee Library.
- Herrmann, Paul (1954). Conquest by Man. Translated by Michael Bullock. Hamish Hamilton. ISBN 9781199054388.
- Josephus, Flavius (1810). The Genuine Works of Flavius Josephus. Translated by William Whiston. Columbia University. ISBN 9781163637531.
- Marx, Robert (2004). Treasure Lost at Sea: Diving to the World's Great Shipwrecks. Firefly Books. p. 26. ISBN 9781552978726. "roman brazil."
- Migoń, Piotr, ed. (2010). Geomorphological Landscapes of the World. Springer Publishing. ISBN 9789048130559.
- Ramos, Bernardo de Azevedo da Silva (1930). "Chapter XIV". Tradiçoes da America Pré-Histórica, Especialmente do Brasil Vol. I (in Portuguese). Imprensa Nacional.
- Turin, Rodrigo (2005). "A 'Obscura História' Indígena. O discurso Etnográfico no IHGB (1840–1870)". Estudos Sobre a Escrita da História: Anais do Encontro de Historiografia e História Política (in Portuguese). 7Letras. ISBN 9788575773505.
- Twidale, C. R. (1982). Granite Landforms. Elsevier. ISBN 9780444597649.
- Waggoner, John (2008). Brazil Travel Adventures. Hunter Publishing. ISBN 9781588436764.
