= Ithobaal I =

9th-century BCE King of Tyre

- King of Tyre
- Predecessor: Phelles (8 months, 879 BC)
- Successor: Baal-Eser II (Balazeros, Ba‘l-mazzer II) 846 – 841 BC
- Born: 915 BC; Tyre, presumed
- Died: 847 or 846 BC
- Issue: Jezebel and Baal-Eser II
- Dynasty: Began house of Ithobaal/Ithobalus
- Father: Ahiram?
- Mother: unknown

Ithobaal I (Note: (Hebrew: אֶתְבַּעַל ʾEṯbaʿal, 1 Kings 16:31; Ancient Greek: Εἰθώβαλος Eithobalos)) is the name of a 9th-century BCE king of Tyre mentioned in the story of Jezebel from the Hebrew Bible, and in a citation by Josephus of a list of the kings of Tyre put together by the Phoenician author Menander of Ephesus (2nd century BCE).

== Sources and chronology ==
Primary information related to Ithobaal comes from Josephus's citation of the Phoenician author Menander of Ephesus, in Against Apion i.18. Here it is said that the previous king, Phelles, “was slain by Ithobalus, the priest of Astarte, who reigned thirty-two years, and lived sixty-eight years; he was succeeded by his son Badezorus (Baal-Eser II).”

Based on the work of F. M. Cross and other scholars who take 825 BC as the date of Dido's flight from her brother Pygmalion, after which she founded the city of Carthage in 814 BC, Ithobaal was born in 915 BC, killed King Phelles and assumed the throne in 883 BC, and died in 847 or 846 BC.

== Relation to Ahab of Israel ==
Ithobaal held close diplomatic contacts with king Ahab of Israel. 1 Kings 16:31 relates that his daughter Jezebel married Ahab (874 – 853 BC), and Phoenician influence in Samaria and the other Israelite cities was extensive. In 1 Kings Ithobaal is labeled king of the Sidonians. At this time Tyre and Sidon were consolidated into one kingdom.

== Indirect Assyrian sources ==
Tyre is not mentioned as an opponent of Shalmaneser III at the Battle of Qarqar in 853 BC, but twelve years later, in 841, Ithobaal's son Baal-Eser II gave tribute to the Assyrian monarch.

== See also ==
- List of Kings of Tyre
- Pygmalion
- Pedra da Gávea
