= Piotr Migoń =

Polish geomorphologist

Piotr Migoń is a Polish geomorphologist active at the university of Wrocław where he holds a chair as professor of geography. Migoń has specialized in the study of weathering, mass movements in mountains, long-term landscape evolution and the geomorphology of granite and sandstone areas. Most of his research has been carried out in the Sudetes and other parts of Central Europe. He wrote the documentation for the granite landforms of Dartmoor, UK, for the First 100 Geoheritage Sites of the IUGS. He is currently an International Association of Geomorphologists (IAG) board member, and in 2026 he was awarded the Brunsden Medal (named in honour of Professor Denys Brunsden, OBE) by the IAG.

== Books ==
- Granite Landscapes of the World, Oxford University Press, 2006, ISBN 978-0-19-927368-3
- Geomorphological Landscapes of the World, Springer Science & Business Media, 2010, ISBN 978-90-481-3055-9
