= Pygmalion of Tyre =

Pygmalion
- King of Tyre

King of Tyre
- Reign: 831 BC – 785 BC
- Predecessor: Mattan I
- Successor: unknown
- Born: 841 or 843 BC; Tyre, presumed
- Died: 785 BC
- Dynasty: House of Ithobaal I
- Father: Mattan I
- Mother: unknown

Pygmalion (Phoenician: 𐤐𐤌𐤉𐤉𐤕𐤍 Pūmayyātān 'Pummay has given'; Ancient Greek: Πυγμαλίων, romanized: Pugmalíōn; Latin: Pygmalion) was king of Tyre from 831 to 785 BC and a son of King Mattan I (840–832 BC).

During Pygmalion's reign, Tyre seems to have shifted the heart of its trading empire from the Middle East to the Mediterranean, as can be judged from the building of new colonies including Kition on Cyprus, Sardinia (see Nora Stone discussion below), and, according to tradition, Carthage. For the story surrounding the founding of Carthage, see Dido.

== Name ==
The Latin spelling Pygmalion represents the Greek Pugmalíōn (Πυγμαλίων).

The Greek form of the name has been identified as representing the Phoenician Pumayyaton (or Pūmayyātān). This name is recorded epigraphically, as 𐤐𐤌𐤉𐤉𐤕𐤍, pmyytn, a theophoric name interpreted as meaning "Pummay has given".

Several scholars have identified Baa‘li-maanzer, the king of Tyre who gave tribute to Shalmaneser III in 841 BC, with 𐤁𐤏𐤋𐤏𐤑𐤅𐤓 Baʿal-'azor (Phoenician form of the name) or Baal-Eser/Balazeros (Greek form of the name), Pygmalion's grandfather.

The Nora Stone, discovered in 1773, has also been read as containing the name Pum(m)ay (PMY) by Frank Moore Cross in 1972. Cross has identified this PMY with Pumayyatan and further with Pygmalion of Tyre. This is highly speculative, and there is no consensus whatsoever on the interpretation of the inscription, not even on whether the text is intended as being read in boustrophedon.

There is also epigraphic attestation of an apparent theonym pgmlyn (𐤐𐤂𐤌𐤋𐤉𐤍) found on inscriptions such as the Douïmès medallion. This may either suggest an alternative Phoenician etymology for the name, or it may simply be a Phoenician attempt at transliterating the Greek form of the name; though in the case of the Douïmès medallion, the supposed age of the artefact may present some difficulties for the latter hypothesis.

== Date ==
Pygmalion's dates are derived from Josephus's Against Apion i.18, where Josephus quotes the Phoenician historian Menander as follows:

Pygmalion . . . lived fifty-six years, and reigned forty-seven years. Now, in the seventh year of his reign, his sister fled away from him, and built the city of Carthage in Libya.

Pygmalion's dates, if this citation is to be trusted, are thus dependent on the date of the founding of Carthage. Here ancient classical sources give two possibilities: 825 or 814 BC. The 814 date is derived from the Greek historian Timaeus (c. 345–260 BCE), and is the more commonly accepted year. The 825 date is taken from the writings of Pompeius Trogus (1st century BCE), whose forty-four book Philippic History survives only in abridged form in the works of the Roman historian Justin. In a 1951 article, J. Liver argued that the 825 date has some credibility because, with it, the elapsed time between that date and the start of building of Solomon's Temple, given as 143 years and 8 months in Menander/Josephus, agrees very closely with the date of approximately 967 BCE for the start of Temple construction as derived from 1 Kings 6:1 (fourth year of Solomon) and the date given by most historians for the end of Solomon's forty-year reign, i.e. 932 or 931 BCE. If, however, the starting place is 814 BCE, measuring back 143 or 144 years does not agree with this Biblical date.

Liver advanced a second reason to favor the 825 date, related to the inscription of Shalmaneser III, king of Assyria, mentioned below, where it was mentioned that philological studies have equated this Ba'li-manzer with Balazeros (Baal-Eser II), grandfather of Pygmalion. The best texts of Menander/Josephus give six years for Balazeros, followed by nine years for his son and successor Mattenos (Mattan I), making 22 years between the start of Balazeros's reign and the seventh year of Pygmalion. If these 22 years are measured back from 814 BCE, they fall short of the 841 date required for Balazeros's tribute to Shalmaneser. With the 825 date, however, Balazeros's last year would be approximately 841 BCE, the time of the tribute to Shalmaneser.

These two agreements, one with an Assyrian inscription and the other with a Biblical datum, have proved quite convincing to scholars such as J. M. Peñuela, F. M. Cross., and William H. Barnes. Peñuela points out that the following consideration reconciles the two dates for Carthage derived from classical authors: 825 BCE was the year that Dido fled Tyre, and she did not found Carthage until 11 years later, in 814 BCE. Josephus, citing Menander, says that "in the seventh year of [Pygmalion's] reign, his sister fled away from him, and built the city of Carthage in Libya" (Against Apion i:18). There are two events mentioned here: the flight from Tyre and the founding of Carthage. The language used would suggest that it was the first of these events, Dido's flight, that took place in Pygmalion's seventh year. Between the two events the following took place: Dido and her ships sailed to Cyprus, where about 80 of the men with her took wives. Eventually the Tyrians arrived on the north coast of Africa, where they received permission to build on an island in the harbor of the place where Carthage was eventually to be built. Peñuela quotes Strabo to show that some time then elapsed before the founding of Carthage: "Carthage was not founded immediately. Indeed, a small island having been captured previously in the Carthaginian harbor, Dido settled there. She fortified the place, which she used as a citadel of war against the Africans, who kept her from the shore." Justin (18:5 10–17) also mentions the time on this island, which he names as Cothon, and says that Dido and her company built a circle of houses there. Eventually peace was made with the inhabitants on the mainland, and the Tyrians were given permission to build a city. Peñuela maintained that these various events between the departure from Tyre and the eventual rapprochement with the inhabitants on the mainland explain the eleven-year difference between Pompeius Trogus's date of 825 BCE and the 814 date derived from other classical authors for Carthage's founding.

This understanding of the chronology related to Dido and her company resulted in the following dates for Pygmalion, Dido, and their immediate relations, as derived from F. M. Cross and Wm. H. Barnes:

- Baal-Eser II (Baʿl-mazzer II) 846–841 BCE
- Mattan I 840–832 BCE
- 831 BCE: Pygmalion begins to reign
- 825 BCE: Dido flees Tyre in 7th year of Pygmalion
- 825 BCE and possibly some time thereafter: Dido and companions on Cyprus
- Between 825 BCE and 814 BCE: Tyrians build settlement on island of Cothon
- 814 BCE: Dido founds Carthage on mainland
- 785 BCE: Death of Pygmalion

== Epigraphic evidence ==
=== The Nora Stone ===
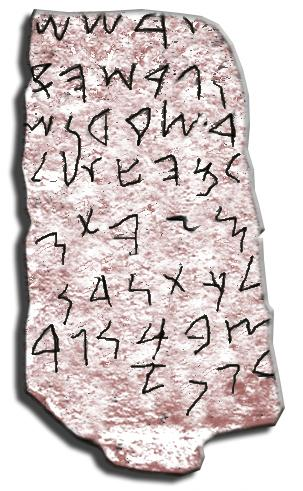
Drawing of the Nora stele.

A possible reference to Pygmalion is an interpretation of the Nora Stone, found on Sardinia in 1773 and, though its precise finding place has been forgotten, dated by paleographic methods to the 9th century BCE. Frank Moore Cross in 1972 has interpreted the Phoenician inscription on this stone as containing a reference to a king "Pumay":

"[ He fought (?) with the Sardinians (?)] at Tarshish and he drove them out. Among the Sardinians he is [now] at peace, (and) his army is at peace: Milkaton son of Shubna (Shebna), general of (king) Pummay."

In this rendering, Cross has restored the missing top of the tablet (estimated at two lines) based on the content of the rest of the inscription, as referring to a battle that has been fought and won. Cross conjectured that Tarshish here "is most easily understood as the name of a refinery town in Sardinia, presumably Nora or an ancient site nearby." He takes the pmy ("Pummay") in the last line as a shortened form of the name of Shubna's king, containing only the divine name, a method of shortening "not rare in Phoenician and related Canaanite dialects". Since there was only one king of Tyre with this hypocoristicon in the 9th century BCE, Cross restores the name to pmy(y)tn or pʿmytn, which is rendered in the Greek tradition as Pygmalion.

There is no consensus whatsoever on the reading of this inscription. Most scholars do not attempt to offer a translation. One alternative interpretation suggests an entirely different meaning: "the text honours a god, most probably in thanks for the traveller's safe arrival after a storm".

=== Tribute of Balazeros (Baalimanzer) to Shalmaneser III ===
In 1951, Fuad Safar published a record of tribute from Baaʿli-maanzer, king of Tyre, to Shalmaneser III of Assyria in 841 BCE. There followed several studies that attempted to relate this Baaʿli-maanzer to the list of kings given in Menander/Josephus. It was argued, based on philological considerations, that the name as given in the Assyrian text could be matched to a Phoenician Baʿal-ʿazor and the Greek Baal-Eser/Balazeros, a name corresponding to two kings in Menander's list. The first Balazeros was a son of Hiram I, contemporary of David and Solomon, so this was too early, but the second name referred to the grandfather of Pygmalion and was therefore in the right date range.

== See also ==
- List of Kings of Tyre
- Dido (Queen of Carthage)
- Pygmalion (mythology)

Pūmayyātān House of Ithobaal I Born: c. 841/843 BCE Died: 785 BCE
Regnal titles
Preceded by Mattan I	King of Tyre; 831 BCE–785 BCE	Unknown
