= Against Apion =

1st century CE polemical work by Flavius Josephus

Against Apion (Greek: περὶ ἀρχαιότητος Ἰουδαίων λόγος Peri Archaiotētos Ioudaiōn Logos; Latin Contra Apionem or In Apionem) is a work written by Flavius Josephus (c. 37 CE – c. 100 CE ) as a defense of Judaism against criticism by the Egyptian author Apion. Josephus was a Roman–Jewish historian, defector, and courtier to the emperors of the Flavian dynasty; Apion was a Hellenized Egyptian grammarian and sophist. The work is dated to after 94 CE.

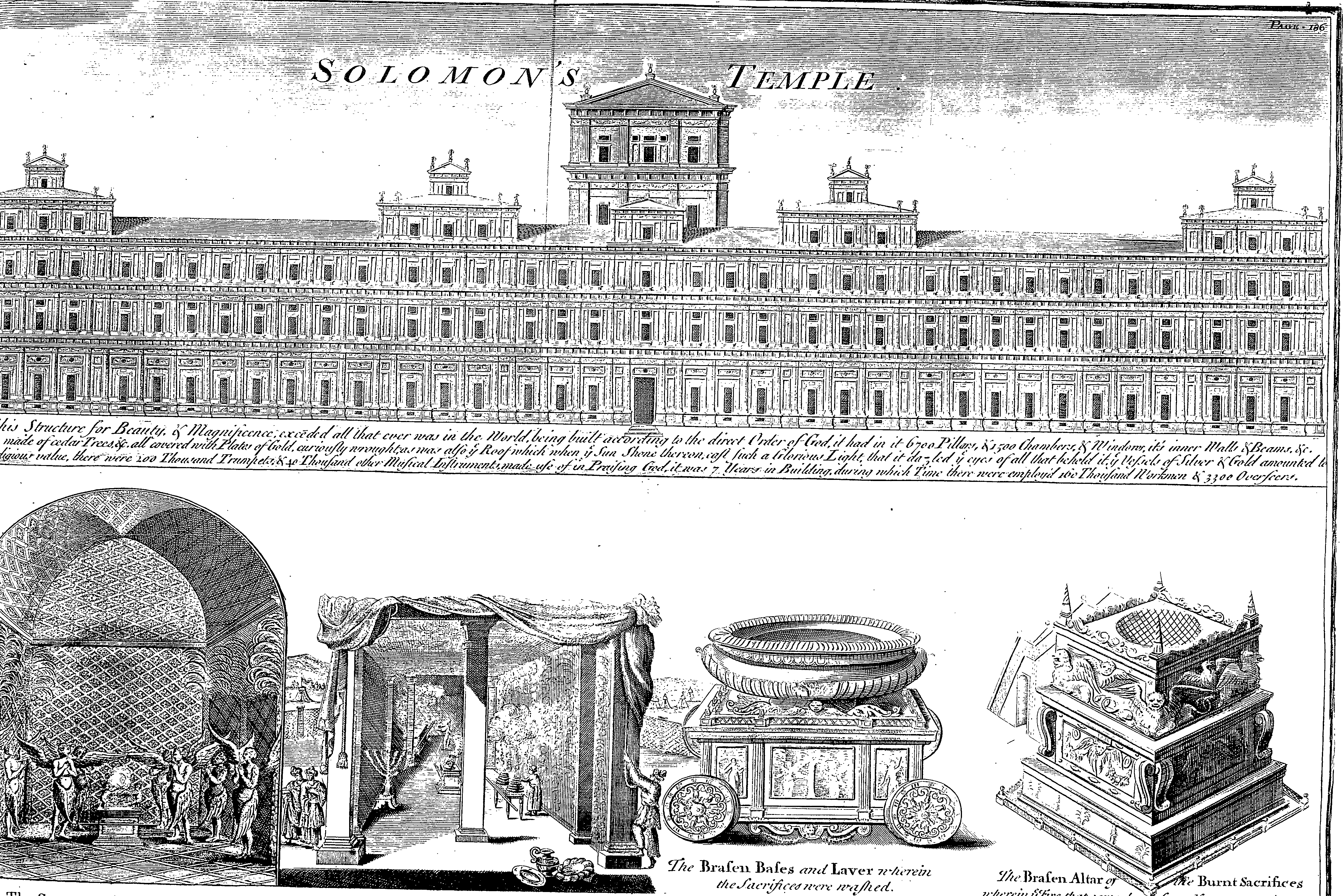
Fleuron from The works of Flavius Josephus: Containing, The Antiquities of the Jews from the Creation of the World, and the Author's Defence of them against Apion.

== Purpose ==
In the centuries of imperial conquests in the Eastern Mediterranean, first by Alexander and his successors (see Hellenistic period) and then by the Romans, a phenomenon arose among the literate elites of the various civilizations that were incorporated into the newly formed imperial states. This took the form of historians from different cultures (typically Egyptian, Jewish, or Greek) writing histories in the form of polemics, with each author claiming his own civilization as the world's oldest, a designation that—to the authors and audience of these works—would serve as proof of cultural supremacy.

Against Apion was Josephus's contribution to the polemical discourse, and also a work of Jewish apologetics, an earlier example of which are the works of Philo of Alexandria (c. 20 BCE – c. 50 CE.) Against Apion is a wide-ranging defense of Judaism against charges laid against Judaism in Josephus's time.

Josephus stressed Judaism's antiquity as a classical religion and philosophy, and opposed it to what he perceived as the more recent—and so less venerable—traditions of the Greeks. Against Apion cites Josephus' earlier work Antiquities of the Jews, so can be dated after 94 CE.

== Sources ==
One of Josephus's main sources was Menander of Ephesus. He also cites Hermippus of Smyrna to argue that Pythagoras (c. 570 – c. 495 BCE) admired the Jews and was a student of Jewish philosophy.

Notably, Josephus incorporates what he says are the words of the Egyptian historian Manetho (fl. 290–260 BCE), purportedly recovered from indirect literary fragments of Manetho's lost work the Aegyptiaca. As Josephus himself notes, his work does not contain quotations from Manetho's original, but rather cites (or claims to cite) from one or perhaps even two epitomized and altered version of Manetho's Aegyptiaca. Against Apion is a narrative, not an epitome. It covers only a portion of Manetho's comprehensive history of Egypt, from about the Fifteenth through the Nineteenth dynasties. This era encompassed the entirety of the Second Intermediate Period. Josephus's use of Manetho in his polemic would loom large in the centuries that followed, as his introduction of the Hyksos and the story of Osarseph entered into the growing discourse on the relative antiquity and primacy of Judaism vis-a-vis Hellenism and then Christianity.

== Positions ==
In the first book of Against Apion (1:8) Josephus delineated which books he believed to be part of Hebrew Scriptures.

In the second book, Josephus defends the historicity of the Hebrew Bible against accusations made by Apion (who Josephus states is not Greek), arguing that Apion in fact rehashes material of Manetho's, though there was apparently some confusion between Manetho's references to the Hyksos and the Hebrews.

Josephus also refutes Apion's blood libel in the second book (2:8).

== Editions ==
- Josephus, The Life. Against Apion (Loeb Classical Library), Harvard University Press, 1926.
- Josephus, Flavius Josephus: Against Apion, trans. and comment. by John M. G. Barclay, Brill, 2013. ISBN 978-9-0041-1791-4
