= Charles Rowland Twidale =

Australian geomorphologist

Charles Rowland Twidale is an Australian geomorphologist active at the University of Adelaide. Twidale's research has covered varied subjects including structural geomorphology, weathering, ancient landscapes in shield regions, granite landforms in deserts, paleosurfaces and the history of geomorphology. Twidale has been most active investigating the geomorphology of Australia, Spain and southwestern United States.

In 1976 C. R. Twidale was president of the Royal Society of South Australia.

In 1993 he was awarded the Mueller Medal by the Australian and New Zealand Association for the Advancement of Science.
