= List of operas by Giuseppe Sarti =

This is a list of operas by Giuseppe Sarti (1729–1802).

== List ==
Title	Genre	Subdivisions	Libretto	Première date	Place, theatre
Pompeo in Armenia	dramma per musica	3 acts	Bartolomeo Vitturi	Carnival 1752	Faenza
Il re pastore	dramma per musica	3 acts	Metastasio	Carnival 1753	Pesaro
Vologeso	dramma per musica	3 acts	Apostolo Zeno's Lucio Vero	Carnival 1754	Copenhagen, Theatre on Kongens Nytorv
Antigono	dramma per musica	3 acts	Metastasio	1754	Copenhagen, Theatre on Kongens Nytorv
Ciro riconosciuto	dramma per musica	3 acts	Metastasio	1754	Copenhagen, Theatre on Kongens Nytorv
Demofoonte	dramma per musica	3 acts	Metastasio	Carnival 1755	Copenhagen, Theatre on Kongens Nytorv
Sesostri	dramma per musica	3 acts	Pietro Pariati	1755	Copenhagen, Theatre on Kongens Nytorv
Arianna e Teseo	dramma per musica		Pietro Pariati	Carnival 1756	Copenhagen, Theatre on Kongens Nytorv
Anagilda	dramma per musica		Girolamo Gigli	1758	Copenhagen, Theatre on Kongens Nytorv
Achille in Sciro	dramma per musica	3 acts	Metastasio	1759	Copenhagen, Theatre on Kongens Nytorv
Armida abbandonata	dramma per musica		Leopoldo de Villati after Torquato Tasso	1759	Copenhagen, Theatre on Kongens Nytorv
Artaserse	dramma per musica	3 acts	Metastasio	Carnival 1760	Copenhagen, Theatre on Kongens Nytorv
Astrea placata	festa teatrale	1 act	Metastasio	17 October 1760	Copenhagen, Theatre on Kongens Nytorv
Andromaca	dramma per musica	3 acts	Apostolo Zeno	1760	Copenhagen, Theatre on Kongens Nytorv
Filindo	pastorale eroica	3 acts	Pietro d'Averara	1760	Copenhagen, Theatre on Kongens Nytorv
Issipile	dramma per musica	3 acts	Metastasio	Spring 1761	Copenhagen, Theatre on Kongens Nytorv
Nitteti	dramma per musica	3 acts	Metastasio	12 October 1761	Copenhagen, Theatre on Kongens Nytorv
Alessandro nell'Indie	dramma per musica	3 acts	Metastasio	Autumn 1761	Copenhagen, Theatre on Kongens Nytorv
La figlia recuperata	dramma pastorale		Pastor Arcade Timido	February 1762	Copenhagen, Theatre on Kongens Nytorv
Semiramide	dramma per musica	3 acts	Metastasio	Autumn 1762	Copenhagen, Theatre on Kongens Nytorv
Didone abbandonata	dramma per musica	3 acts	Metastasio	1762	Copenhagen, Theatre on Kongens Nytorv
Narciso	dramma pastorale	3 acts	Apostolo Zeno	Carnival 1763	Copenhagen, Theatre on Kongens Nytorv
Cesare in Egitto	dramma per musica	3 acts	Giacomo Francesco Bussani	autumn 1763	Copenhagen, Theatre on Kongens Nytorv
Il naufragio di Cipro	dramma pastorale	3 acts	Pietro Andrea Ziani	January or spring 1764	Copenhagen, Theatre on Kongens Nytorv
Il gran Tamerlano	tragedia per musica	3 acts	Agostin Piovene	early 1764	Copenhagen, Theatre on Kongens Nytorv
Ipermestra	dramma per musica	3 acts	Metastasio	Carnival 1766	Rome, Teatro Argentina
La giardiniera brillante	intermezzo	2 acts		1768	Rome, Teatro Valle
L'asile de l'amour	dramatic cantata		Jacques-Marie Deschamps, after Metastasio	22 July 1769	Copenhagen, Christiansborg court
La double méprise, ou Carlile et Fany	comédie mêlée d'ariettes	1 act	Jacques-Marie Deschamps	22 July 1769	Copenhagen, Christiansborg court
Soliman den Anden	syngespil	3 acts	Charlotta Dorothea Biehl, after Charles Simon Favart	8 October 1770	Copenhagen, Kongelige Teater
Le bal	opéra comique		Jacques-Marie Deschamps	1770	Copenhagen, Christiansborg court
Demofoonte (revised version)	dramma per musica	3 acts	Metastasio	30 January 1771	Copenhagen, Kongelige Teater
The Succession to the Throne in Sidon (Tronfølgen i Sidon)	lyrisk tragi-comedia (syngespil)	2 acts	Niels Krog Bredal, after Metastasio's Il re pastore	4 April 1771	Copenhagen, Kongelige Teater
La clemenza di Tito	dramma per musica	3 acts	Metastasio	June 1771	Padua, Obizzi
Il re pastore	dramma per musica	3 acts	Metastasio	1771	Copenhagen, Kongelige Teater
Il tempio d'eternità	festa teatrale	1 act	Metastasio	1771	Copenhagen, Kongelige Teater
Deucalion og Pyrrha	syngespil	1 act	Carolina Amalia Thielo and Niels Krog Bredal, after Germain-François Poullain de Saint-Foix	19 March 1772	Copenhagen, Kongelige Teater
Aglae, or The Column (Aglae, eller Støtten)	syngespil	1 act	Claus Fasting and Adolph Gotthold Carstens, after Louis Poinsinet de Sivry	16 February 1774	Copenhagen, Christiansborg court
Love Letters (Kierlighedsbrevene)	syngespil	3 acts	Charlotta Dorothea Biehl, after Louis de Boissy	22 March 1775	Copenhagen, Christiansborg court
Farnace	dramma per musica	3 acts	Antonio Maria Lucchini	1776	Venice, Teatro San Samuele
Le gelosie villane	dramma giocoso	3 acts	Tommaso Grandi	1776	Venice, Teatro San Samuele
Iphigenia	dramma per musica	3 acts	after Jean Racine	Carnival 1777	Rome, Teatro Argentina
Medonte, re di Epiro	dramma per musica		Giovanni de Gamerra	8 September 1777	Florence, Teatro della Pergola
Il militare bizzarro	dramma giocoso	2 acts	Tommaso Grandi	27 December 1777	Venice, Teatro San Samuele
Scipione	dramma per musica		Eugenio Giunti	autumn 1778	Mestre, Casa Balbi
I contrattempi	dramma giocoso		Nunziato Porta	November 1778	Venice, Teatro San Samuele
Adriano in Siria	dramma per musica	3 acts	Metastasio	26 December 1778	Rome, Teatro Argentina
Olimpiade	dramma per musica	3 acts	Metastasio	1778	Florence
L'ambizione delusa	intermezzo	2 acts		February 1779	Rome, Capranica
Achille in Sciro	dramma per musica	3 acts	Metastasio	Autumn 1779	Florence, Teatro della Pergola
Mitridate a Sinope	dramma per musica	3 acts	after Apostolo Zeno	Autumn 1779	Florence, Palla a Corda
Siroe	dramma per musica	3 acts	Metastasio	26 December 1779	Turin, Teatro Regio
Giulio Sabino	dramma per musica	3 acts	Pietro Giovannini's Epponima	1781	Venice, San Benedetto
Demofoonte (third version)	dramma per musica	3 acts	Metastasio	Carnival 1782	Rome, Argentina
Alessandro e Timoteo	dramma per musica	3 acts	Gastone della Torre di Rezzonico	6 April 1782	Parma, court
Didone abbandonata (revised version)	dramma per musica	3 acts	Metastasio	June 1782	Padua, Obizzi
Fra i due litiganti il terzo gode	dramma giocoso	2 acts	Carlo Goldoni's Le nozze	14 September 1782	Milan, Teatro alla Scala
Attalo, re di Bitinia	dramma per musica	3 acts	Antonio Salvi	26 December 1782	Venice, San Benedetto
Idalide	dramma per musica	3 acts	Ferdinando Moretti	8 January 1783	Milan, Scala
Erifile	dramma per musica	2 acts	Giovanni de Gamerra	Carnival 1783	Pavia
Il trionfo della pace	dramma per musica	2 acts	Cesare Olivieri	10 May 1783	Mantua, Ducale
Olimpiade (revised version)	dramma per musica	3 acts	Metastasio	1783	Rome, Dame
Gli amanti consolati	dramma giocoso	2 acts		1784	St Petersburg
I finti eredi	opera comica	2 acts	Giovanni Bertati's Il vilano geloso	19/30 October 1785	St Petersburg, Kammenïy
Armida e Rinaldo	dramma per musica	2 acts	Marco Coltellini after Torquato Tasso	15/26 January 1786	St Petersburg, Hermitage
Castore e Polluce	dramma per musica	2 acts	Ferdinando Moretti, after Pierre-Joseph Bernard	22 September/3 October 1786	St Petersburg, Hermitage
Zenoclea	azione teatrale	2 acts	Ferdinando Moretti	1786, unperformed	
Alessandro nell'Indie (second version)	dramma per musica		Metastasio	winter 1787	Palermo, San Cecilia
Cleomene	dramma per musica	3 acts	Giovanni de Gamerra	27 December 1788	Bologna, Zagnoni
The Early Reign of Oleg (Nachal'noye upravleniye Olega; Cyrillic: Начальное управление Олега) (Composed in collaboration with Carlo Canobbio and Vasily Pashkevich)		5 acts	Catherine the Great	15/26 October 1790	St Petersburg, Hermitage
Andromeda	dramma per musica		Ferdinando Moretti	24 October/4 November 1798	St Petersburg, Hermitage
Enea nel Lazio	dramma per musica	2 acts	Ferdinando Moretti	15/26 October 1799	St Petersburg, Kammenïy
La famille indienne en Angleterre		3 acts	Marchese Gabriele di Castelnau, after August von Kotzebue	1799	St Petersburg, Kammenïy
Les amours de Flore et de Zéphire	ballet anacréontique	2 acts	Pierre Bressol Chevalier	7/19 September 1800	Gatchina
