= Dido =

Legendary founder and first queen of Carthage

- Queen of Carthage
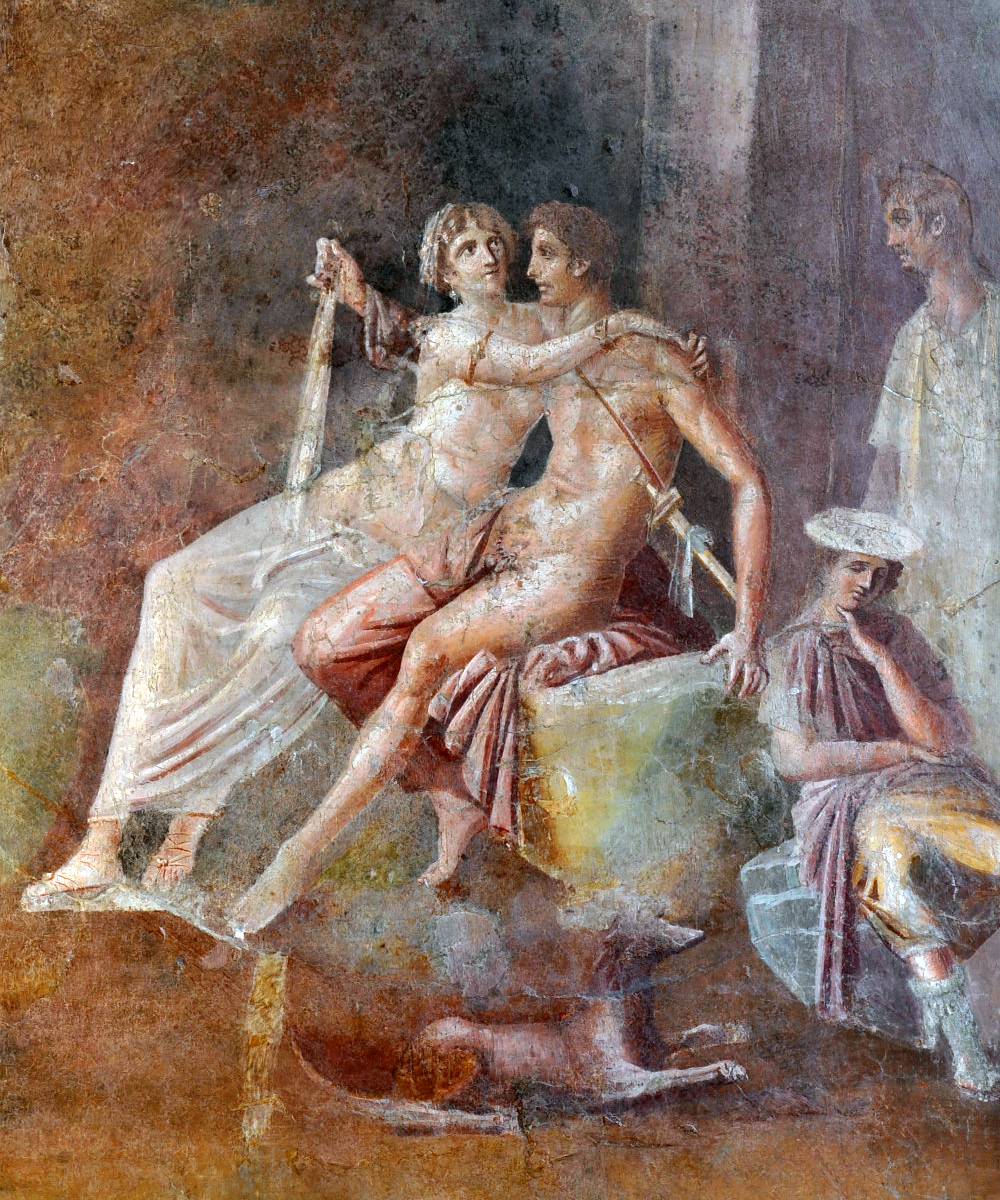
- Dido and Aeneas, from a Roman fresco, Pompeian Third Style (10 BC – 45 AD), Pompeii, Italy
- Abode: Tyre, Carthage

Genealogy
- Born: Tyre (modern-day Lebanon)
- Died: Carthage (modern-day Tunisia)
- Parents: Belus or Mattan I (father)
- Siblings: Anna
- Consorts: Acerbas, Aeneas

In Greek and Roman mythology, Dido (/ˈdaɪdoʊ/ DY-doh; Classical Latin: [ˈdiːdoː]; Ancient Greek: Διδώ [diːdɔ̌ː]), also known as Elissa (/ɪˈlɪsə/ il-ISS-ə; Greek: Ἔλισσα), was the legendary founder and first queen of the Phoenician city-state of Carthage.

In most accounts, she was originally the joint ruler of Tyre who fled tyranny to found her own city in northwest Africa, now modern-day Tunisia. As she is only known from ancient Greek and Roman sources, all of which were written well after Carthage's founding, her historicity remains uncertain.

Details about Dido's character, life, and role in the founding of Carthage are best known from Virgil's epic poem, the Aeneid, published around 19 BC. The poem tells the legendary story of the Trojan hero Aeneas. In the poem, Dido is described as a clever and enterprising woman who founded Carthage after fleeing her tyrannical brother. The city prospers under her leadership until Aeneas arrives and the pair fall in love through Juno and Venus' divine intervention. When Aeneas eventually has to leave Carthage, the love-sick Dido commits suicide upon a pyre.

Dido has been an enduring figure in Western culture, literature, and art from the early Renaissance into the 21st century.

== Name ==
Many names in the legend of Dido are of Punic origin, which suggests that the first Greek authors who mention this story have taken up Phoenician accounts. One suggestion is that Dido is an epithet from the same Semitic root as David, which means "Beloved". Others state Didô means "the wanderer".

According to Marie-Pierre Noël, "Elishat/Elisha" is a name repeatedly attested on Punic votives. It is composed of:

- the Punic reflex of *ʾil- "god", which can mean the remote Phoenician creator god El, or it can be names of God in Judaism,

and

- "‐issa", which could be either "ʾiš" (𐤀𐤎), meaning "fire", or another word for "woman".

Other works state that it is the feminine form of El. In Greek it appears as Theiossô, which translates Élissa: el becoming theos.

== Early accounts ==
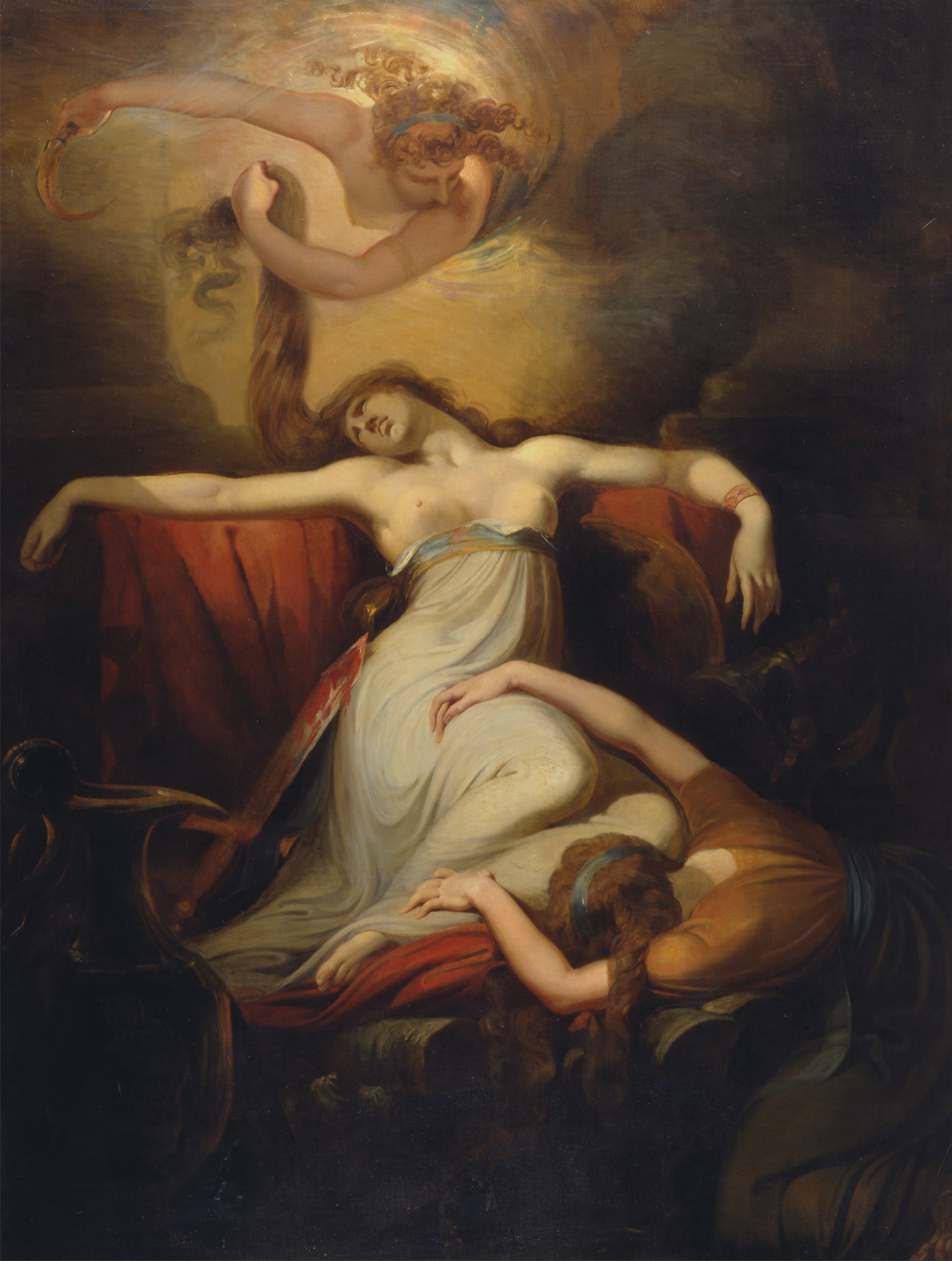
Dido, 1781 oil painting by Henry Fuseli

The oldest references to Dido's character can be traced to the lost writings of Sicilian historian Timaeus of Tauromenium (c. 356–260 BC). In his Histories, Timaeus claims that Dido founded Carthage in 814 BC, around the same time as the founding of Rome.

Appian, in the beginning of his Punic Wars, claims that Carthage was founded by Zorus and Carchedon. However, Zorus looks like an alternative transliteration of the city name Tyre, while Carchedon is just the Greek form of Carthage. Timaeus named Carchedon's wife as Elissa, the sister of King Pygmalion of Tyre. Archaeological evidence of settlement on the site of Carthage before the last quarter of the 8th century BC has yet to be found. That the city is named 𐤒𐤓𐤕 𐤇𐤃𐤔𐤕 (Qart-hadasht, or "New City") at least indicates it was a colony.

=== Trogus and Justin ===
The only surviving full account of Dido's story before Virgil's treatment is that of Virgil's contemporary, Gnaeus Pompeius Trogus, in his Philippic Histories, which was reworked into an epitome by Junianus Justinus (Justin) in the 3rd century AD.

Justin, quoting or paraphrasing Trogus, writes that the king of Tyre made his beautiful daughter Dido (Elissa) and son Pygmalion his joint heirs. However, upon the king's death, the people took Pygmalion alone as their ruler, even though he was still a child. Dido married her uncle Acerbas, who, as priest of Heracles (Melqart), was second in power to the king. There were rumors that Acerbas had secretly buried a large store of gold, and Pygmalion had Acerbas murdered in hopes of claiming it for himself. Dido was enraged, and eventually planned to trick her brother and flee Tyre.

Dido pretended to want to move into Pygmalion's home; her brother agreed, as he believed Dido would bring Acerbas' stores of gold with her when she moved. He sent a number of attendants to help her. She filled bags with sand, and, pretending they were gold, had the attendants cast them into the sea, pretending that they were an offering to her late husband's shade. Dido then persuaded the attendants to join her in flight to another land rather than face Pygmalion's anger when he discovered what had supposedly become of Acerbas' wealth. Some sympathetic senators also joined her.

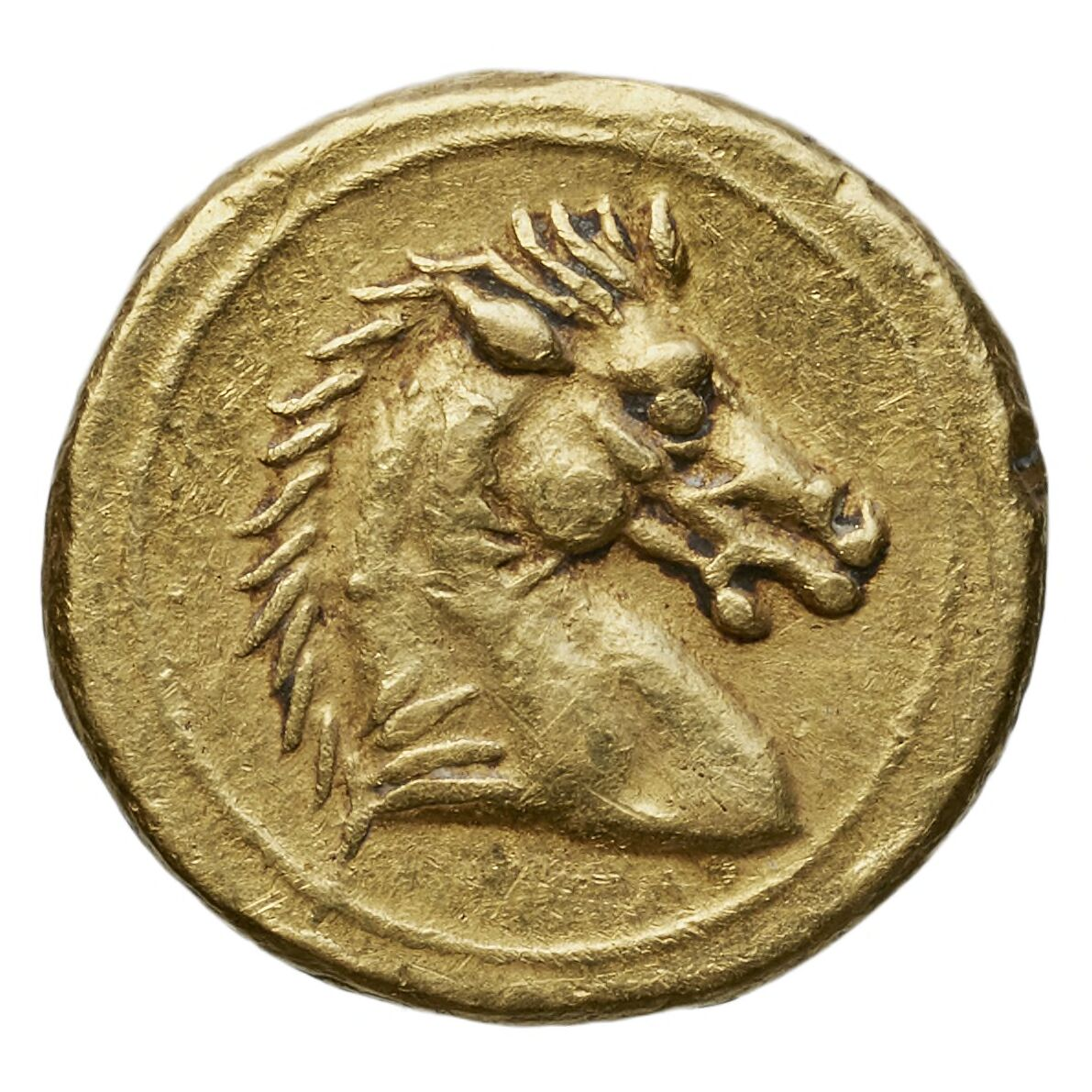
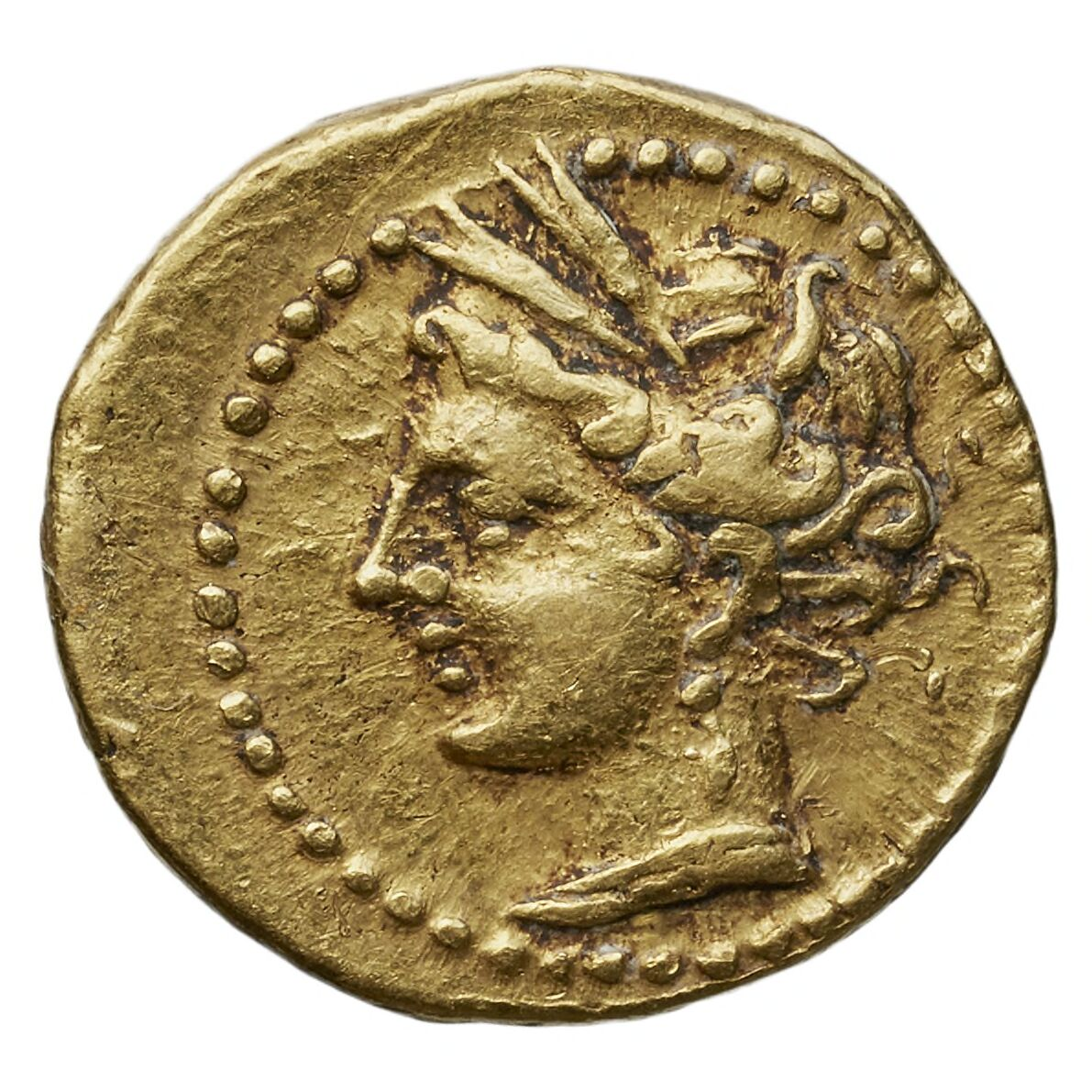
A horse's head is a frequent motif on Carthaginian coinage, sometimes with a female profile on the obverse usually identified as the goddess Tanit, whose iconography may have influenced Virgil's imagery of Juno and Dido (shekel, c. 153–146 BC )

The group first arrived at Cyprus. There, Dido ordered her party to seize eighty women working as prostitutes on the shore, so that her men would have wives and eventually be able to populate her future city.

Eventually Dido and her followers arrived on the coast of North Africa. There, she bargained with the locals for a small piece of land to act as a refuge until she could continue her journeying: only as much land as could be encompassed by an oxhide. They agreed. Dido then cut the oxhide into fine strips so that she had enough to encircle an entire nearby hill, which was afterwards named Byrsa ("hide").

Dido and her party established a settlement on the hill. Locals began to join the group, and both they and envoys from the nearby Phoenician city of Utica urged the building of a city. While digging the foundation, an ox's head was found, indicating that the city that would be wealthy but subjected to the rule of others if built at that site. In response to this portent, another area of the hill was dug instead, where a horse's head was found, indicating that the city would be powerful and warlike. Carthage was thus founded, and the center of the city was the citadel on Byrsa.

After some time, Carthage grew to be powerful and prosperous. However, Iarbas, king of the Maxitani (or Mauritani), demanded Dido's hand in marriage so that they could combine their kingdoms; if she denied him, he would launch war against Carthage. However, she preferred to stay faithful to her first husband. She created a ceremonial funeral pyre and sacrificed many victims under the pretense that she was honoring and appeasing her husband's spirit before marrying Iarbas. However, Dido instead ascended the pyre, announcing that "she would go to her husband as they had desired her," and killed herself with a sword. After her suicide, Dido was deified and worshipped as a goddess as long as Carthage endured. In this account, the founding of Carthage occurred 72 years before the foundation of Rome.

== Virgil's Aeneid ==
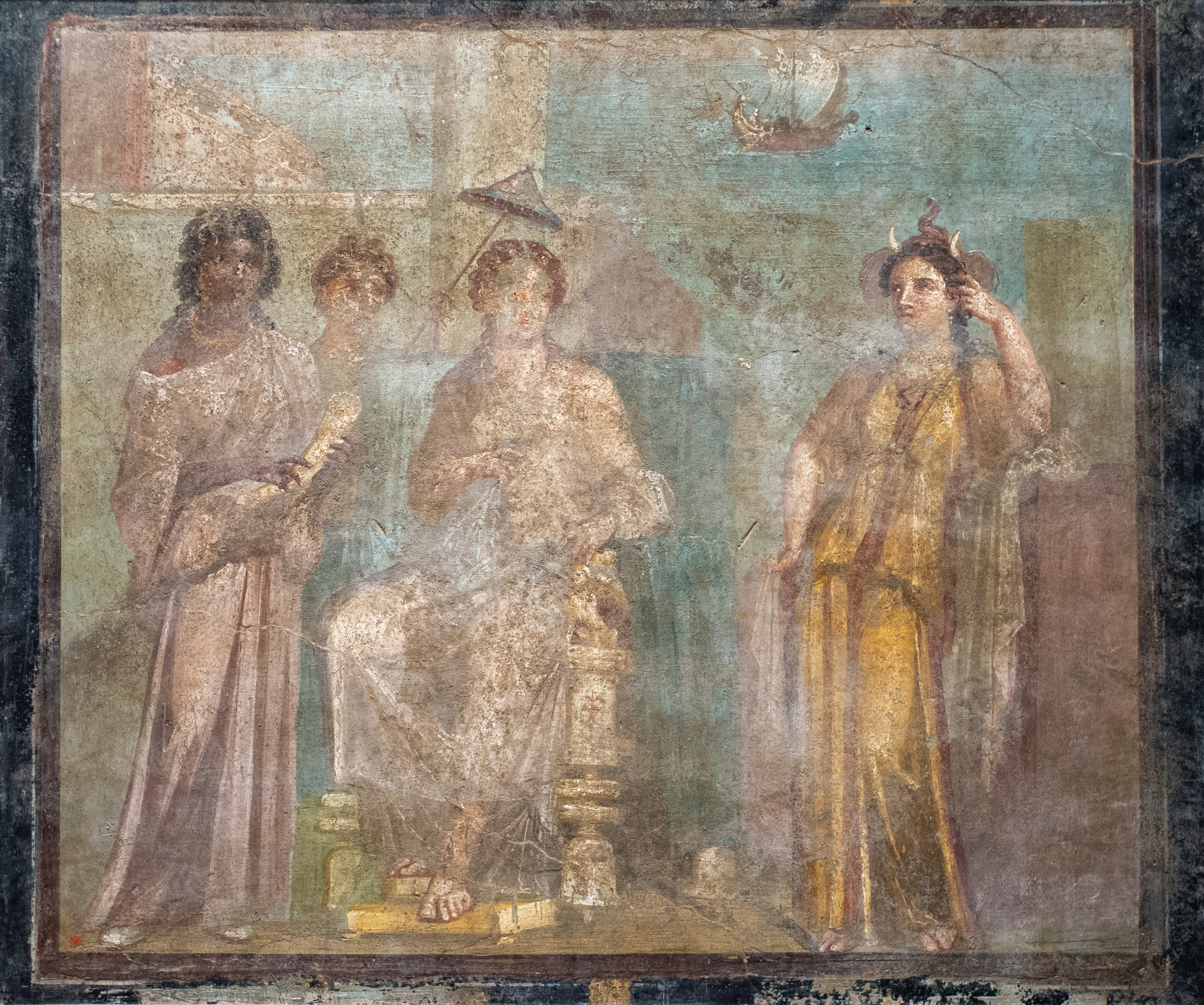
Dido seated on a throne attended by handmaiden, looking at the personification of Africa wearing an elephant hide. Aeneas' ship features in the background. Fresco in Pompeii

=== Dido flees Tyre ===
Virgil names Belus as Dido's father; this figure is occasionally referred to as Belus II by later commentators to distinguish him from Belus, son of Poseidon, and a figure in earlier Greek mythology. Classicist T. T. Duke suggests that this is a hypocoristicon of the historical father of Pygmalion and Dido, Mattan I, also known as MTN-BʿL (Matan-Baʿal, 'Gift of the Lord').

The Aeneid's narrative closely follows that of Trogus and Justin. However, while Trogus names the character Elissa, Virgil uses Dido as nominative, but uses Elissa (Eliza) in oblique cases. Virgil's Dido was a princess of Tyre who married Sychaeus (Acerbas), a wealthy priest of Hercules, while her father was still alive. Sychaeus had a large store of hidden wealth, and Dido's brother Pygmalion murdered the priest so he could claim this wealth for himself. Sychaeus appeared to Dido in a dream, revealed her brother's actions and the true location of his wealth, and urged her to flee Tyre. She obeyed, and left the city with those who hated or feared Pygmalion.

=== Aeneas arrives at Carthage ===
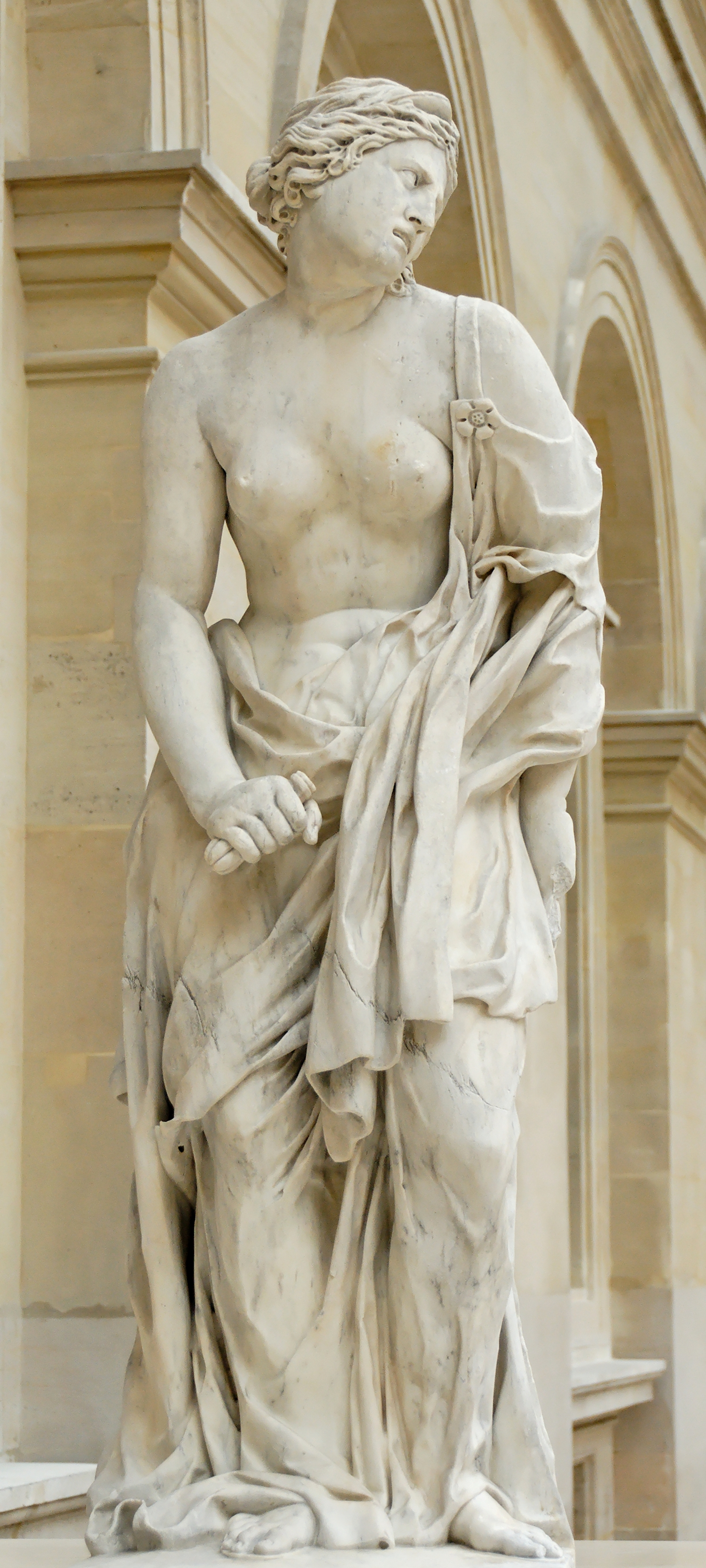
Dido, attributed to Christophe Cochet, formerly at the Marly and currently at the Louvre

Aeneas, a Trojan prince who fled Troy after it fell to the Greeks, eventually landed on Carthage's shores after many years of wandering. Dido welcomed him warmly, having heard word about his exploits, and arranged a feast. However, Venus, Aeneas' mother, sensed that Dido and Carthage were under Juno's control. Unbeknownst to Aeneas, Venus tasked her other son, Cupid, with infiltrating the party in the guise of Aeneas's son Ascanius. Dido embraces the disguised Cupid, who plants in her heart a powerful, all encompassing love and desire for Aeneas. However, she was conflicted, as she had sworn never to remarry after her first husband was killed. Juno became aware of Venus' actions, and proposed that they marry the couple and join the pair's kingdoms. By the goddess' design, the pair consummated their relationship in a cave. However, while Dido called Aeneas her husband, Aeneas claimed they were never officially married.

When news of their relationship reached Iarbas, a son of Jupiter whose marriage offer Dido scorned, he angrily prayed to his father. Jupiter then dispatched Mercury to remind Aeneas of his journey and the city he was destined to found. Aeneas agreed and prepared to leave. When an enraged Dido confronted him and asked him to stay, he refused, as he could not deviate from his divinely ordained fate.

=== Dido's suicide ===
Dido was enraged by this betrayal, and could no longer bear to live. She had her sister Anna build a pyre under the pretense of burning all that reminded her of Aeneas, including weapons and clothes that he had left behind, and the couch she called their bridal bed. When Dido saw Aeneas' fleet leaving, she cursed him and proclaimed endless hate between Carthage and the descendants of Troy, foreshadowing the Punic Wars. Dido then ascended the pyre, laid again on the couch, and stabbed herself with Aeneas' sword. Anna rushed in and embraced her dying sister, and Juno sent Iris to release Dido's spirit from her body. From their ships, Aeneas and his crew saw the glow of the burning funeral pyre, and could only guess at what had happened.

At least two scholars have argued that the inclusion of the pyre as part of Dido's suicide— otherwise unattested in prior epics and tragedies— alludes to the self-immolation that took the life of Carthage's last queen, or the wife of its general Hasdrubal the Boetharch, in 146 BC.

=== After death ===
During his journey in the underworld, Aeneas met Dido's shade, soaked in blood. Aeneas cried and begged her to forgive him, but she averted her eyes and stayed silent before turning to walk into a grove where her former husband Sychaeus waited.

== Later Roman tradition ==
=== Ovid ===
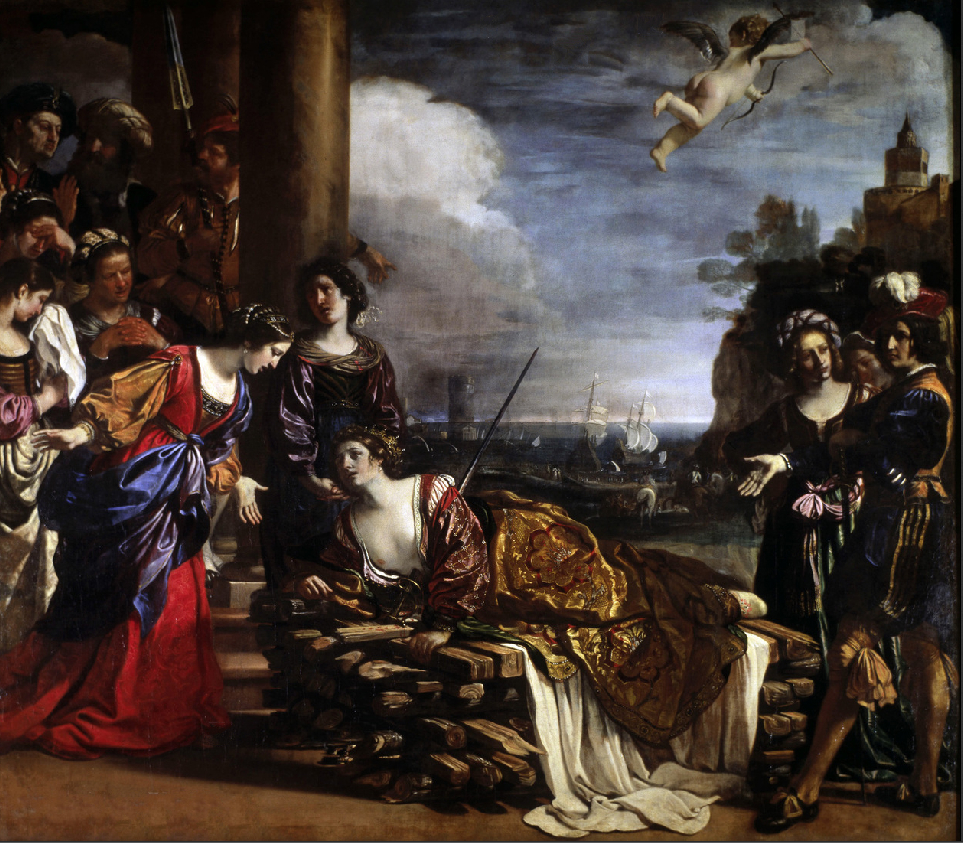
Death of Dido, 1631 painting by Guercino

In Ovid's Heroides, Epistle 7 is Dido's address to Aeneas just before she ascends the pyre and commits suicide. The narrative aligns with Virgil's, and focuses on Dido's grief and anger at being left behind by her lover.

In the Fasti, Ovid narrates the life of Anna Perenna, a Roman goddess he identifies as Dido and Pygmalion's sister. After Dido's death, she is eventually shipwrecked onto the coasts of Latium, home to Aeneas' settlement of Lavinium. However, Aeneas' wife Lavinia became jealous. She planned to murder Anna, but Dido's unkempt, blood-soaked ghost appeared before her sister's bed as she slept, begging her to flee. Anna obeyed and was swept away by the river god Numicus and transformed into a river nymph.

=== Silius Italicus ===
Dido's figure influences the plot of Silius Italicus’s poem Punica, a retelling of the events of the Second Punic War which draws from the mythological roots of the conflict. In Book 1, Silius recounts Dido's founding of Carthage, ascribing the city's enmity with Rome to the conquering aspirations of its patron goddess Juno. In a temple on the site of Dido's suicide, a young Hannibal learns about this history from his father Hamilcar. Hannibal then swears his famous oath that he will oppose Rome in war to "Elissa [Dido], by your shade." In this book, Silius also traces the ancestry of the Barcid family to a younger brother of Dido.

In Book 8, the spirit of Dido's sister Anna is sent to Hannibal by Juno. Anna tells not only of Dido's suicide and a ghostly visit from her sister, but her own wanderings from Cyrene to Italy, where she is ultimately deified as a river. Anna’s tale, as well as her prophecy of Hannibal’s future triumph in the Battle of Cannae, rouses the Carthaginian general to battle.

== Historicity and dating ==
The oxhide story which explains the name of the hill is most likely of Greek origin since Byrsa means "oxhide" in Greek, not in Punic. The name of the hill in Punic was probably just a derivation from Semitic brt "fortified place". But that does not prevent other details in the story from being Carthaginian, albeit still not necessarily historical. Michael Grant in Roman Myths (1973) claims that "Dido-Elissa was originally a goddess", and that she was converted from a goddess into a mortal (if still legendary) queen sometime in the later fifth century BC by a Greek writer.

Others conjecture that Dido was indeed historical, as described in the following accounts. It is unknown who first combined the story of Dido with the tradition that connected Aeneas either with Rome or with earlier settlements from which Rome traced its origin. A fragment of an epic poem by Gnaeus Naevius who died at Utica in 201 BC includes a passage which might or might not be part of a conversation between Aeneas and Dido. Servius in his commentary (4.682; 5.4) cites Varro (1st century BC) for a version in which Dido's sister Anna killed herself for love of Aeneas.

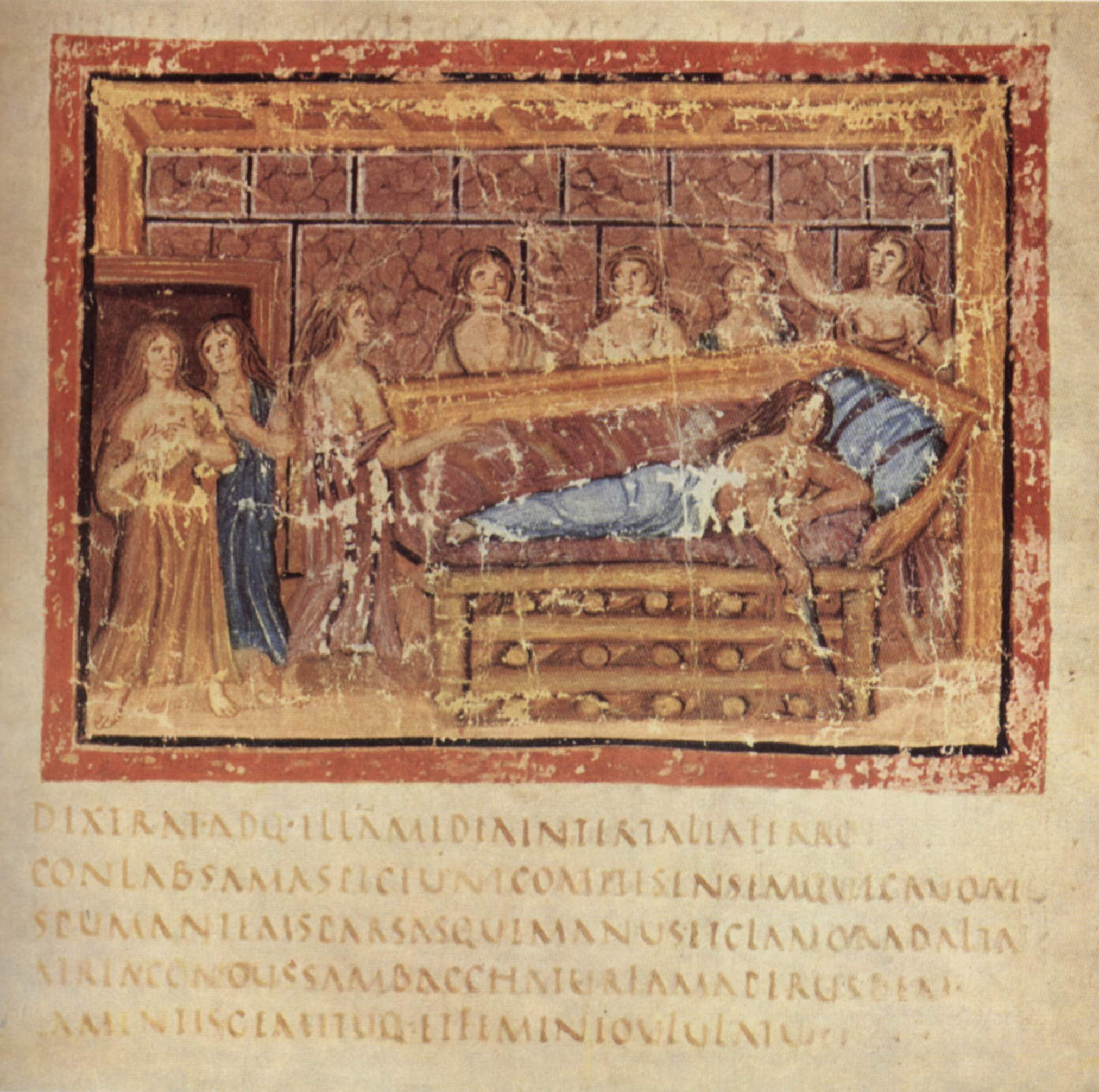
Aeneid, Book IV, Death of Dido. From the Vergilius Vaticanus (Vatican Library, Cod. Vat. lat. 3225)

Evidence for the historicity of Dido (which is a question independent of whether or not she ever met Aeneas) can be associated with evidence for the historicity of others in her family, such as her brother Pygmalion and their grandfather Balazeros. Both of these kings are mentioned, as well as Dido, in the list of Tyrian kings given in Menander of Ephesus's list of the kings of Tyre, as preserved in Josephus's Against Apion, i.18. Josephus ends his quotation of Menander with the sentence "Now, in the seventh year of his [Pygmalion's] reign, his sister fled away from him and built the city of Carthage in Libya."

The Nora Stone, found on Sardinia, has been interpreted by Frank Moore Cross as naming pmy[y]tn or p‘mytn, which is rendered in the Greek tradition as Pygmalion, as the king of the general who was using the stone to record his victory over the local populace. On paleographic grounds, the stone is dated to the 9th century BC. (Cross's translation, with a longer discussion of the Nora stone, is found in the Pygmalion article). If Cross's interpretation is correct, this presents inscriptional evidence substantiating the existence of a 9th-century-BC king of Tyre named (in Greek) Pygmalion.

Several scholars have identified Baa‘li-maanzer, the king of Tyre who gave tribute to Shalmaneser III in 841 BC, with 𐤁𐤏𐤋𐤏𐤑𐤅𐤓 Ba‘al-'azor (Phoenician form of the name) or Baal-Eser/Balazeros (Greek form of the name), Dido's grandfather. This lends credibility to the account in Josephus/Menander that names the kings of Tyre from Abibaal and Hiram I down to the time of Pygmalion and Dido.

Another possible reference to Balazeros is found in the Aeneid. It was a common ancient practice of using the hypocoristicon or shortened form of the name that included only the divine element, so that the "Belus" that Virgil names as the father of Dido in the Aeneid may be a reference to her grandfather, Baal-Eser II/Balazeros. Classicist T. T. Duke suggests that instead it is a hypocoristicon of Mattan I, who was also known as MTN-BʿL (Matan-Baʿal, 'Gift of the Lord').

Even more important than the inscriptional and literary references supporting the historicity of Pygmalion and Dido are chronological considerations that give something of a mathematical demonstration of the veracity of the major feature of the Pygmalion/Dido saga, namely the flight of Dido from Tyre in Pygmalion's seventh year, and her eventual founding of the city of Carthage. Classical authors give two dates for the founding of Carthage. The first is that of Pompeius Trogus, mentioned above, that says this took place 72 years before the foundation of Rome. At least as early as the 1st century BC, and then later, the date most commonly used by Roman writers for the founding of Rome was 753 BC. This would place Dido's flight in 753 + 72 = 825 BC. Another tradition, that of the Greek historian Timaeus (c. 345–260 BC), gives 814 BC for the founding of Carthage. Traditionally most modern scholars have preferred the 814 date. However, the publication of the Shalmaneser text mentioning tribute from Baal-Eser II of Tyre in 841 BC caused a re-examination of this question, since the best texts of Menander/Josephus only allow 22 years from the accession of Baal-Eser/Balazeros until the seventh year of Pygmalion, and measuring back from 814 BC would not allow any overlap of Balazeros with the 841 tribute to Shalmaneser. With the 825 date for the seventh year of Pygmalion, however, Balazeros's last year would coincide with 841 BC, the year of the tribute. Additional evidence in favor of the 825 date is found in the statement of Menander, repeated by Josephus as corroborated from Tyrian court records (Against Apion i.17,18), that Dido's flight (or the founding of Carthage) occurred 143 years and eight months after Hiram of Tyre sent assistance to Solomon for the building of the Temple. Using the 825 date, this Tyrian record would then date the start of Temple construction in 969 or 968 BC, in agreement with the statement in 1 Kings 6:1 that Temple construction began in Solomon's fourth regnal year. Solomon's fourth year can be calculated as starting in the fall of 968 BC when using the widely accepted date of 931/930 BC for the division of the kingdom after the death of Solomon. These chronological considerations therefore definitely favor the 825 date over the 814 date for Dido's departure from Tyre. More than that, the agreement of this date with the timing of the tribute to Shalmaneser and the year when construction of the First Temple began provide evidence for the essential historicity of at least the existence of Pygmalion and Dido as well as their rift in 825 BC that eventually led to the founding of Carthage.

According to J. M. Peñuela, the difference in the two dates for the foundation of Carthage has an explanation if we understand that Dido fled Tyre in 825 BC, but eleven years elapsed before she was given permission by the original inhabitants to build a city on the mainland, years marked by conflict in which the Tyrians first built a small city on an island in the harbor. Additional information about Dido's activities after leaving Tyre are found in the Pygmalion article, along with a summary of later scholars who have accepted Peñuela's thesis.

If chronological considerations thus help to establish the basic historicity of Dido, they also serve to refute the idea that she could have had any liaison with Aeneas. Aeneas fought in the Trojan War, which is conventionally dated anywhere from the 14th to the 12th centuries BC, far too early for Aeneas to have been alive in the time of Dido. Even with the date of 864 BC that historical revisionist David Rohl gives for the end of the Trojan War, Aeneas would have been about 77 years old when Dido fled Tyre in 825 BC and 88 when she began to build Carthage in 814 (following Peñuela's reconstruction), hardly consistent with the romantic intrigues between Dido and Aeneas imagined by Virgil in the Aeneid. According to Velleius Paterculus, Cádiz and Utica (roughly meaning "Old Town" opposed to Carthage meaning "New Town") were founded more than 80 years after the Trojan War and before Carthage which he claimed was founded 65 years before Rome (753 + 65 = 818 BC).

== Continuing tradition ==
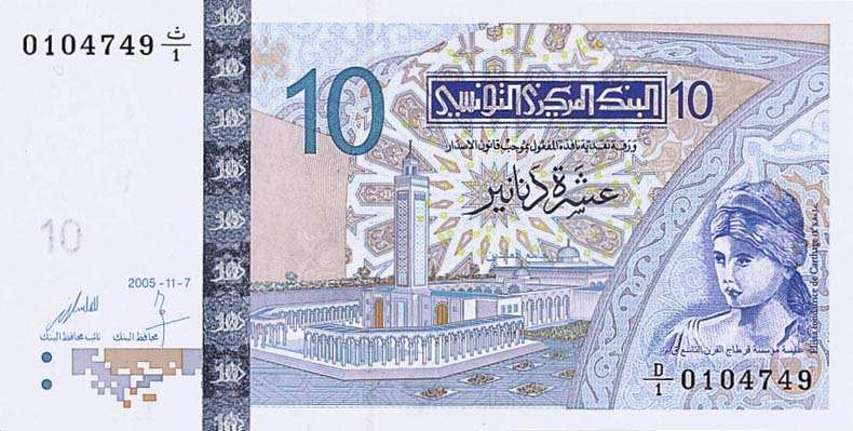
Tunisian dinar banknote issued in 2005, with a portrait of Elissa

Numerous early Italian works refer to Dido, e.g., Proverbia super natura feminarum, 101-108 (Proverbs on the Nature of Women) (ca. 1152) and L’Intelligenza (1360-1380), where Dido is seen crying because Aeneas has left by sea. On seeing the departing sails billow in the air, she stabs herself in the stomach (stanzas 70-73).

In the Divine Comedy, Dante puts the shade of Dido (though not naming her) in the second circle of Hell (V, 61-62), where she is condemned among the lustful to be hurled for eternity in a fierce infernal storm ("la bufera infernal" [V, 31]). Virgil points to her saying, "L'altra è colei che s'ancise amorosa, / e ruppe fede al cener di Sicheo" ("The next is she who killed herself for love, / And broke faith with the ashes of Sichaeus" [Longfellow translation, 1867]).

Contrary to Dante’s view of Dido as lustful, Petrarch and Boccaccio, influenced by St. Jerome’s Against Jovinianus, portray Dido as a faithful wife to Sychaeus.

Petrarch refers to Dido both in his Trionfi, specifically in the "Triumph of Chastity," where she is an exemplary widow, as well as in one of the Letters of Old Age (Seniles, IV, 5). She also appears in his epic poem Africa (IV, 4-6).

Boccaccio refers to her at least eight times, most notably in chapter 42 of On Famous Women (1361-1362), the first collection of biographies in Western literature devoted exclusively to women. Dido appears in five of his Italian works (Ninfale d’Ameto, Elegia di Madonna Fiammetta, Filocolo, Amorosa visione, and Teseida (VI, 45) and three times in Latin. In addition to On Famous Women, Dido’s story is narrated in his mythological treatise, On the Genealogy of the Gods, and in On the Fates of Famous Men.

In Renaissance Italy, Dido’s story appears most notably in three tragedies:

- Alessandro Pazzi de' Medici, Dido in Cartagine (1524)
- Giambattista Giraldi Cinthio, Didone (1543)
- Lodovico Dolce, Didone (1547) with the latter play being the most successful.

In France, Christine de Pizan narrates the story of Dido in Le Livre de la cité des dames (1405) (Book II, Chapter LV).

Hélisenne de Crenne (pseudonym of Marguerite Briet) evokes Dido in her sentimental novel Les Angoisses douleurs qui doit faire d'amour (1538).

And Étienne Jodelle wrote a tragedy, apparently never staged, titled Didon se sacrifiant (Dido Sacrificing Herself) (1558). In the 17th century, Alexandre Hardy used the same title for one of his plays.

Dido's legend inspired the Renaissance drama Dido, Queen of Carthage by Christopher Marlowe.

Geoffrey Chaucer tells Dido’s story in his The Legend of Good Women (III: The Legend of Dido), presenting her as an example of virtue.

William Shakespeare refers to Dido twelve times in his plays: four times in The Tempest, albeit all in one dialogue, twice in Titus Andronicus, and also in Henry VI Part 2, Antony and Cleopatra, Hamlet, Romeo and Juliet, A Midsummer Night's Dream and, most famously, in The Merchant of Venice, in Lorenzo's and Jessica's mutual wooing:

In such a night
Stood Dido with a willow in her hand
Upon the wild sea banks and waft her love
To come again to Carthage.

Lea Desandre performs the "Dido's Lament" aria from Purcell's Dido and Aeneas with Les Arts Florissants in 2020

The story of Dido and Aeneas remained popular throughout the post-Renaissance era and was the basis for many operas, with the libretto by Metastasio, Didone abbandonata, proving especially popular with composers throughout the eighteenth century and beyond:

- 1641: La Didone by Francesco Cavalli
- 1656: La Didone by Andrea Mattioli
- 1689: Dido and Aeneas by Henry Purcell
- 1693: Didon by Henry Desmarets
- 1707: Dido, Königin von Carthago by Christoph Graupner
- 1724: Didone abbandonata by Domenico Sarro
- 1726: Didone abbandonata by Leonardo Vinci
- 1740: Didone abbandonata by Baldassare Galuppi
- 1742: Didone abbandonata by Johann Adolph Hasse
- 1747: Didone abbandonata by Niccolò Jommelli
- 1762: Didone abbandonata by Giuseppe Sarti
- 1770: Didone abbandonata by Niccolò Piccinni
- 1783: Didon by Niccolò Piccinni
- 1823: Didone abbandonata by Saverio Mercadante
- 1860: Les Troyens by Hector Berlioz
- 2007: Aeneas and Dido by James Rolfe (composer)

Also from the 17th century is a ballad inspired by the relationship between Dido and Aeneas. The ballad, often printed on a broadside, is called "The Wandering Prince of Troy", and it alters the end of the relationship between the two lovers, rethinking Dido's final sentiment for Aeneas and rewriting Aeneas's visit to the underworld as Dido's choice to haunt him.

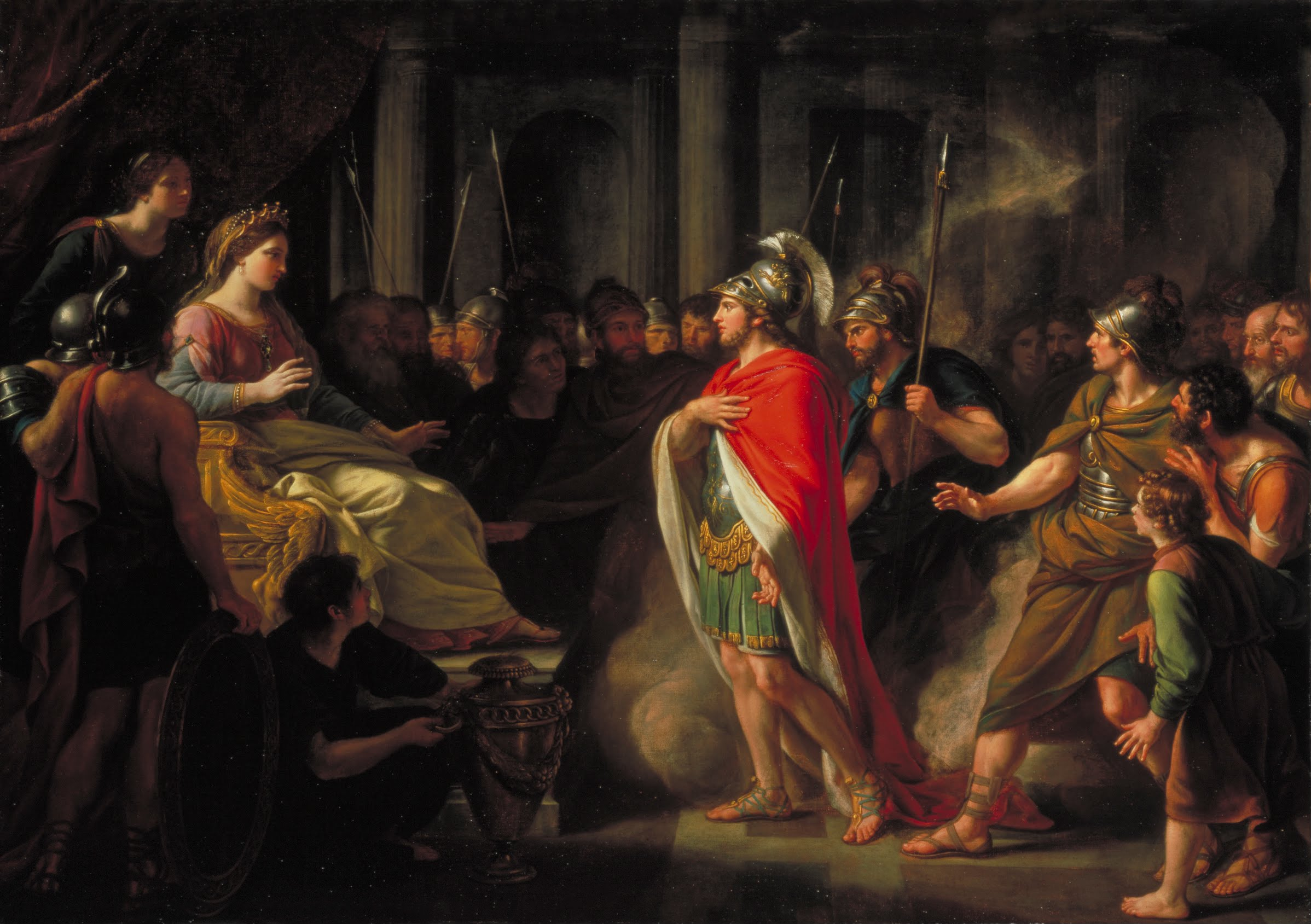
The Meeting of Dido and Aeneas by Nathaniel Dance-Holland, 1766

In 1794 Germany, Charlotte von Stein wrote her own drama named Dido, with an autobiographical element—as von Stein had been forsaken by her own lover, the famous Goethe, in a manner which she found reminiscent of Aeneas.

In Spain, Dido continues to be a source of inspiration for novelists in this century, in particular María García Esperón, Dido Para Eneas (Mexico, Ediciones El Naranjo, 2014) and Irene Vallejo, El silbido del arquero (Zaragoza: Editorial Contraseña, 2015).

Will Adams' 2014 thriller The City of the Lost assumes that Dido fled only as far as Cyprus and founded a city on the site of modern Famagusta, that she died there and that Carthage was founded later, when Dido's followers fled further west after a vengeful expedition arrived from Tyre. In this interpretation, the two flights - from Tyre to Cyprus and from Cyprus to Carthage - were combined in later historical memory and all attributed to Dido. In Adams' account, the startling discovery of Dido's hideout and her well-preserved body happens accidentally during an attempted Coup D'etat by Turkish Army officers based in Cyprus.

In another modern interpretation, Dido appears in Sid Meier's strategy games Civilization II and Civilization V, as the leader of the Carthaginian civilization, although she appears alongside Hannibal in the former. In Civilization V, she speaks Phoenician, with a modern Israeli accent. In 2019, Dido was made the leader of Phoenicia in Civilization VI: Gathering Storm, with Tyre as its capital and Carthage as an available name for subsequent cities.

In honor of Dido, the asteroid 209 Dido, discovered in 1879, was named after her. Another dedication of Queen Dido is the Mount Dido in Antarctica.

Remembrance of the story of the bull's hide and the foundation of Carthage is preserved in mathematics in connection with the Isoperimetric problem of enclosing the maximum area within a fixed boundary, which is sometimes called Dido's Problem in modern calculus of variations. (Similarly, the Isoperimetric theorem is sometimes called Dido's Theorem.) It is sometimes stated in such discussion that Dido caused her thong to be placed as a half circle touching the sea coast at each end (which would add greatly to the area) but the sources mention the thong only and say nothing about the sea.

Carthage was the Roman Republic's greatest rival and enemy, and Virgil's Dido in part symbolises this. Even though no Rome existed in her day, Virgil's Dido curses the future progeny of the Trojans. In Italy during the Fascist administration of the 1920s to 1940s, she was regarded as a rival and sometimes negative figure, perhaps not only as a symbol of Rome's nemesis, but because she represented together at least three other unpleasant qualities: her reputation for promiscuity, her "Semitic race", and for being a symbol of Rome's erstwhile rival Carthage. As an example, when the streets of new quarters in Rome were named after the characters of Virgil's Aeneid, only the name Dido did not appear.

Tunisian currency depicting Dido (Elissa) was issued in 2006.

== Selected bibliography ==
- H. Akbar Khan, "Doctissima Dido": Etymology, Hospitality and the Construction of a Civilized Identity, 2002.
- Elmer Bagby Atwood, Two Alterations of Virgil in Chaucer's Dido, 1938.
- S. Conte, Dido sine veste, 2005.
- R. S. Conway, The Place of Dido in History, 1920.
- F. Della Corte, La Iuno-Astarte virgiliana, 1983.
- G. De Sanctis, Storia dei Romani, 1916.
- Edgeworth, R. J. (1976). "The Death of Dido". The Classical Journal. 72 (2): 129–133. JSTOR 3297083.
- M. Fantar, Carthage, la prestigieuse cité d'Elissa, 1970.
- L. Foucher, Les Phéniciens à Carthage ou la geste d'Elissa, 1978.
- Michael Grant, Roman Myths, 1973.
- M. Gras/P. Rouillard/J. Teixidor, L'univers phénicien, 1995.
- H.D. Gray, Did Shakespeare write a tragedy of Dido?, 1920.
- G. Herm, Die Phönizier, 1974.
- T. Kailuweit, Dido – Didon – Didone. Eine kommentierte Bibliographie zum Dido-Mythos in Literatur und Musik, 2005.
- R.C. Ketterer, The perils of Dido: sorcery and melodrama in Vergil's Aeneid IV and Purcell's Dido and Aeneas, 1992.
- R.H. Klausen, Aeneas und die Penaten, 1839.
- G. Kowalski, De Didone graeca et latina, 1929.
- A. La Penna, Didone, in Enciclopedia Virgiliana, II, 1985, 48–57
- F.N. Lees, Dido Queen of Carthage and The Tempest, 1964.
- J.-Y. Maleuvre, Contre-Enquête sur la mort de Didon, 2003.
- J.-Y. Maleuvre, La mort de Virgile d’après Horace et Ovide, 1993;
- L. Mangiacapre, Didone non è morta, 1990.
- P.E. McLane, The Death of a Queen: Spencer's Dido as Elizabeth, 1954.
- O. Meltzer, Geschichte der Karthager, 1879.
- A. Michel, Virgile et la politique impériale: un courtisan ou un philosophe?, 1971.
- R.C. Monti, The Dido Episode and the Aeneid: Roman Social and Political Values in the Epic, 1981.
- S. Moscati, Chi furono i Fenici. Identità storica e culturale di un popolo protagonista dell'antico mondo mediterraneo, 1992.
- R. Neuse, Book VI as Conclusion to The Faerie Queene, 1968.
- Noël, Marie-Pierre (2014). Élissa, la Didon grecque, dans la mythologie et dans l'histoire [Elissa, the Greek Dido, in mythology and history]. Journée d'étude ”Les figures de Didon : de l'épopée antique au théâtre de la Renaissance”, lab. IRCL, Université Paul-Valéry Montpellier 3, Montpellier, 10 janvier 2014 (in French). IRCL.
- Adam Parry, The Two Voices of Virgil's Aeneid, 1963.
- G.K. Paster, Montaigne, Dido and The Tempest: "How Came That Widow In?, 1984.
- B. Schmitz, Ovide, In Ibin: un oiseau impérial, 2004;
- E. Stampini, Alcune osservazioni sulla leggenda di Enea e Didone nella letteratura romana, 1893;
- A. Ziosi, Didone regina di Cartagine di Christopher Marlowe. Metamorfosi virgiliane nel Cinquecento, 2015;
- A. Ziosi, Didone. La tragedia dell'abbandono. Variazioni sul mito (Virgilio, Ovidio, Boccaccio, Marlowe, Metastasio, Ungaretti, Brodskij), 2017.

== Primary sources ==
- Virgil, Aeneid i.338–368
- Justinus, Epitome Historiarum philippicarum Pompei Trogi xviii.4.1–6, 8
