= Medonte =

Medonte may refer to:

- Medonte Township
- Medonte (Mysliveček)
- Medonte, re di Epiro
