= Lucio Silla =

1772 opera by W. A. Mozart

- Opera by W. A. Mozart
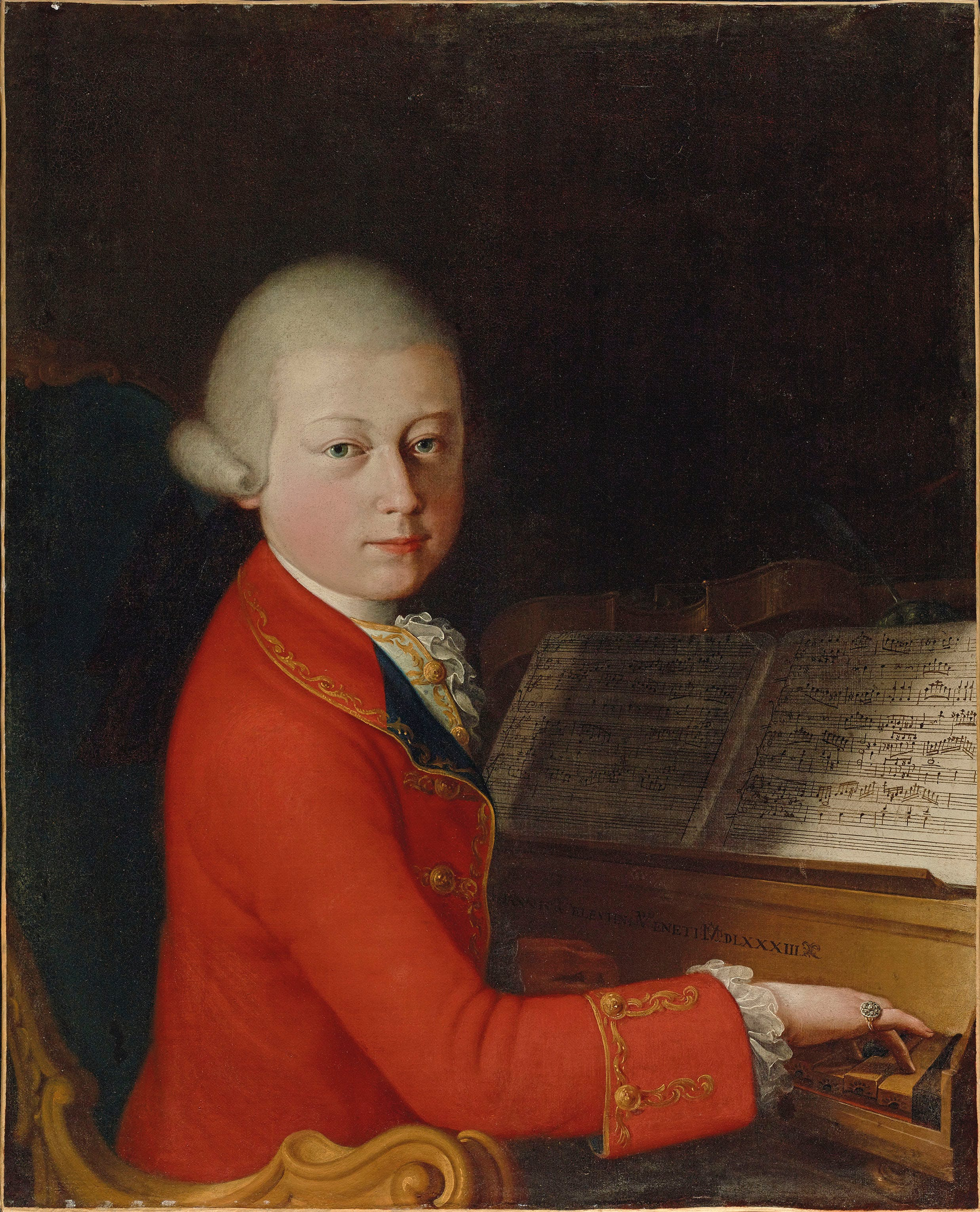
- 1770 Verona portrait of Mozart
- Librettist: Giovanni de Gamerra
- Language: Italian
- Premiere: 26 December 1772; Teatro Regio Ducale, Milan

Lucio Silla (Italian: [ˈluːtʃo ˈsilla]), K. 135, is an Italian opera seria in three acts composed by Wolfgang Amadeus Mozart at the age of 16. The libretto was written by Giovanni de Gamerra, revised by Pietro Metastasio.

It was first performed on 26 December 1772 at the Teatro Regio Ducale in Milan and was regarded as "a moderate success". By 23 January 1773 it had been performed twenty-six times.

Handel's opera Silla (1713) covered the same subject. Other operas with the same title were also composed by Leonardo Vinci (1723), Pasquale Anfossi (1774), and Johann Christian Bach (1776).

== Performance history ==
Lucio Silla premiered on 26 December 1772 in Milan at the Teatro Regio Ducale. Its UK premiere was produced by Camden Town Hall in London in 1967. Its US premiere followed in 1968 with a performance in Baltimore.

Among other performances, Lucio Silla was given by the Santa Fe Opera in 2005 and in Warsaw in 2011 and by The Classical Opera Company in London in 2012. In 2013 the Gran Teatre del Liceu produced the opera in Barcelona and it was performed at both the Mozartwoche Salzburg and Salzburg Festival. Chicago Opera Theater presented the piece in 2015 at the Harris Theater for Music and Dance under the direction of then-General Director Andreas Mitisek. Lucio Silla was staged at Madrid's Teatro Real in 2017 as part of the program for its bicentennial celebration. In November 2017, La Monnaie in Belgium produced and performed the opera in a contemporary setting.

== Roles ==
Roles, voice types, premiere cast
Role	Voice type	Premiere cast, 26 December 1772 Conductor: W. A. Mozart
Lucio Silla (Lucius Cornelius Sulla), dictator of Rome	tenor	Bassano Morgnoni
Celia, sister of Lucio Silla	soprano	Daniella Mienci
Giunia (Junia), betrothed to Cecilio	soprano	Anna de Amicis Buonsolazzi
Cecilio (Cecilius), Roman senator in exile	soprano castrato	Venanzio Rauzzini
Lucio (Lucius) Cinna, friend of Cecilio	soprano (en travesti)	Felicità Suardi
Aufidio (Aufidius), tribune and friend of Lucio Silla	tenor	Giuseppe Onofrio
Guards, nobles, senators, people (chorus)

== Synopsis ==
The story concerns the Roman dictator Lucio Silla (Lucius Sulla) who lusts after Giunia, the daughter of his enemy Gaius Marius. Giunia, on the other hand, loves the exiled senator Cecilio.

=== Act 1 ===
Scene 1: A secluded spot on the banks of the Tiber'

The exiled Senator Cecilio meets his friend Cinna who tells him his betrothed Giunia mourns his death, a lie by the dictator Silla so that he can win her for himself. Cinna advises Cecilio to meet Giunia by the tomb of her father (murdered hero Gaius Marius). Cecilio is filled with joy at the idea and Cinna shares his joy and predicts the freedom of Rome (aria: "Vieni ov' amor t' inita").

Scene 2

Cecilio excited at the prospect of meeting his betrothed sings of his love (aria: "Dunque sperar poss'io ... Il tenero momento").

Scene 3: Giunia's apartments

Silla seeks the advice of his sister Celia on his approach with Giunia and she advises subtlety and kindness (aria: "Se lusinghiera speme").

Scene 4

On Silla's approach, Giunia declares her love for Cecilio and her hate for Silla, her father's enemy (aria: "Dalla sponda tenebrosa").

Scene 5

Alone, Silla, insulted, decides to behave as a tyrant (aria: "Il desìo di vendetta, e di morte").

Scene 6

Cecilio waits by the tomb for Giunia.

Scene 7

Giunia arrives (chorus and ariosa: "Fuor di queste urne dolente").

=== Act 2 ===
An archway decorated with military trophies

Silla is joined by Celia to whom he tells of his plans to wed Giunia and for Celia to wed her beloved Cinna on this day.

Scene 3

Cinna restrains Cecilio who has his sword drawn trying to follow Silla, believing he has been instructed by the spirit of Gaius Marius to seek revenge. Cinna tells him to consider Giunia and his rage is controlled (aria: "Quest' improvviso trèmito").

Scene 4[??]

Giunia consults with Cinna who suggests she accept Silla's proposal and then murder him in their wedding bed. Giunia refuses, stating that vengeance is for Heaven alone to consider. She asks Cinna to make sure that Cecilio stays hidden from danger (aria: "Ah se il crudel periglio").

Scene 5

Cinna resolves to kill Silla himself (aria: "Nel fortunato istante").

Scene 6, Hanging gardens

Silla's love for Giunia starts to bring out his compassion.

Scene 7

Giunia's hateful face angers him again and he threatens her with death but not to die alone (aria: "D' ogni pieta mi spoglio").

Scene 8

With Cecilio, Giunia worries about Silla's words and they part.

Scene 9

Celia asks Giunia to accept Silla's proposal for the sake of happiness saying she is also to be married to Cinna (aria: "Quando sugl' arsi campi").

Scene 10

Giunia ponders her wretchedness.

Scene 11, the Capitol

Silla asks the Senate and the people of Rome to reward him as a hero of Rome with the marriage to Giunia.

Scene 12

When Cecilio appears, there is confrontation (trio: "Quell' orgoglioso sdegno").

=== Act 3 ===
Scene 1: Entrance to the dungeons

Cecilio has been imprisoned. Cinna and Celia has gained access and Cinna asks Celia to convince Cecilio to repent and forget his love. Cinna promises to marry Celia if she is successful, for which she is hopeful (aria: "Strider sento la procella").

Scene 2

Whilst Cecilio accepts his fate Cinna tells him not to worry, Silla's heart over his head will bring about his own downfall (aria: "De' più superbi il core").

Scene 3

Silla has allowed Giunia one last visit to Cecilio and they say their farewells (aria: "Pupille amate").

Scene 4

Giunia alone with her thoughts of Cecilio's impending death thinks of her own (aria: "Frà I pensier più funesti di morte").

Scene 5: The audience chamber

Before the Senators and the people of Rome, to everybody's surprise, Silla declares that he wishes Cecilio to live and marry Giunia. When questioned on his silence, Cinna declares his hatred of Silla and his intention of killing him. Silla issues his "punishment" to Cinna that he should marry his beloved Celia. He further declares that he will step down as dictator and restore liberty to Rome. He explains that he has seen proof that innocence and a virtuous heart is triumphant over power and glory. The people of Rome celebrate liberty and the greatness of Silla.

== Noted arias ==
Act 1

- 1.03 "Vieni ov'amor t'invita" – Lucio Cinna
- 1.04 "Dunque sperar poss'io ... Il tenero momento" – Cecilio
- 1.07 "Se lusinghiera speme" – Celia
- 1.10 "Dalla sponda tenebrosa" – Giunia
- 1.12 "Il desio di vendetta" – Silla

Act 2

- 2.01 "Guerrier che d'un acciaro ... Se or cede a un vil timore" – Aufidio
- 2.04 "Quest' improvviso tremito" – Cecilio
- 2.05 "Se il labbro timido" – Celia
- 2.07 "Ah se il crudel periglio" – Giunia
- 2.09 "Nel fortunato istante" – Lucio Cinna
- 2.12 "D'ogni pietà mi spoglio" – Silla
- 2.15 "Ah se a morir" – Cecilio
- 2.17 "Quando sugl'arsi campi" – Celia
- 2.19 "Parto, m'affretto" – Giunia

Act 3

- 3.02 "Strider sento la procella" – Celia
- 3.04 "De più superbi il core" – Lucio Cinna
- 3.07 "Pupille amate" – Cecilio
- 3.09 "Fra i pensier più funesti" – Giunia

== Analysis ==
The Mozart scholars Téodor de Wyzewa and Georges de Saint-Foix have described the work as a "grande crise romantique" ("a great romantic crisis"), whilst others have attempted to attribute it to a Sturm und Drang period in the composer's output. Rudolph Angermüller, in his book Mozart's Operas, called it a "sentimental tragedy".

and noted the subjective moods of individual characters portrayed throughout the opera, as well as the full-scale numbers given to secondary characters. He also notes that Lucio Silla is the first opera where Mozart replaced the conventional recitativo secco with accompanied recitatives which shed light on the characters' emotional state.

Angermüller also mentions the more ambitious orchestration of Lucio Silla compared to the composer's earlier opera for Milan, Mitridate, re di Ponto. Many numbers resemble symphonic compositions with obbligato vocal parts, and there is evidence of a ballet, Le gelosie del Serraglio, K. 135a, choreographed by the French dancer Jean-Georges Noverre, with whom Mozart would work with again in Paris in 1778. The completed version of the ballet music is lost, although not entirely; a few sketches survive.

Lucio Silla was Mozart's last opera written in Italy, and as he grew older, his wunderkind effect on the public was waning. His next opera, La finta giardiniera, was produced for Munich in 1774, but Mozart later still showed desire to write operas for Italy, as is evident in a letter sent to his father, Leopold, on 4 February 1778: "Please do your utmost to ensure that we [Wolfgang and Aloysia Weber] get to Italy. You know my greatest desire is to write operas." In the same letter, he also expressed his desire to write an opera for Verona.

== Recordings ==
- 1962 – Fiorenza Cossotto (Cecilio), Dora Gatta (Giunia), Rena Gary Falachi (Celia), Ferrando Ferrari (Lucio Silla), Luigi Pontiggia (Aufidio), Anna Maria Rota (Lucio Cinna) – Coro Polifonico di Milano, Orchestra da Camera dell'Angelicum di Milano, Carlo Felice Cillario (RCA)
- 1980 – Júlia Várady (Cecilio), Arleen Augér (Giunia), Helen Donath (Celia), Peter Schreier (Lucio Silla), Werner Krenn (Aufidio), Edith Mathis (Lucio Cinna) – Salzburger Rundfunkchor, Mozarteum Orchestra Salzburg, Leopold Hager (Deutsche Grammophon). Recorded in 1980, it was later reissued in 1991 as part of the Complete Mozart Edition on Philips (Vol. 32), and then again in 2000 as part of the Complete Mozart Compact Edition, where it was included in Box 13 (Early Italian Operas), with no libretto and stripped down booklets. The original 1991 release included an extensive booklet consisting of the complete libretto in Italian, English, German and French, as well as notes by Gottfried Kraus, and paintings and illustrations. It is still regarded as the most complete recording, and is now the reference version of the opera.
- 1985 – Ann Murray (Cecilio), Lella Cuberli (Giunia), Christine Barbaux (Celia), Anthony Rolfe Johnson (Lucio Silla), Ad van Baasbank (Aufidio), Britt-Marie Aruhn (Lucio Cinna) – Orchestre et Chœrs du Théâtre Royal de la Monnaie, Sylvain Cambreling (Brilliant Classics)
- 1989 – Cecilia Bartoli (Cecilio), Edita Gruberová (Giunia), Dawn Upshaw (Celia), Peter Schreier (Lucio Silla), Yvonne Kenny (Lucio Cinna) – Arnold Schoenberg Chor, Concentus Musicus Wien, Nikolaus Harnoncourt (Teldec). Recorded between June and September 1989, it was the first recording of the opera on period instruments, and Harnoncourt chose to add some of his own touches. He removed the minor character of Aufidio altogether, as well as cutting some irrelevant numbers, making it shorter than Hager's 1980 recording. This is also due to the sometimes overly-fast paces that Harnoncourt chooses to apply, which is often disliked or criticized by music critics.
- 2006 – Monica Bacelli (Cecilio), Annick Massis (Giunia), Julia Kleiter (Celia), Roberto Saccà (Lucio Silla), Stefano Ferrari (Aufidio), Veronica Cangemi (Lucio Cinna) – Orchestra and Chorus of Teatro La Fenice di Venezia, Tomáš Netopil (Deutsche Grammophon). Originally recorded at La Fenice in 2006, staged and directed by Jürgen Flimm, it was released in 2006 in DVD form on Deutsche Grammophon, and was late reissued in 2007 in CD form on Dynamic Records (licensed from DG). It was remastered in digital for the CD release.
- 2008 – Kristina Hammarström (Cecilio), Simone Nold (Giunia), Susanne Elmark (Celia), Lothar Odinius (Lucio Silla), Jakob Næslund Madsen (Aufidio), Henriette Bonde-Hansen (Lucio Cinna) – Vocal Group Ars Nova, Danish Radio Sinfonietta, Ádám Fischer (Dacapo)
