= Giovanni de Gamerra =

Italian cleric, playwright, and poet

Giovanni de Gamerra (26 December 1742 – 29 August 1803) was an Italian cleric, playwright, and poet. He is best known as a prolific librettist.

Gamerra was born in Livorno, and worked from 1771 at the Teatro Regio Ducale in Milan – an important centre for opera at the time. Operas based on his librettos include Sarti's Medonte, re di Epiro and Josef Mysliveček's Il Medonte, Paisiello's Pirro, several operas by Antonio Salieri and Mozart's Lucio Silla (though this libretto was modified by Metastasio). His Erifile, regina di Zacinto was set by several composers, as was Adrasto, re d'Egitto. De Gamerra is also said to have been the first translator of Mozart's Die Zauberflöte into Italian. His librettos are in the grand, orderly tradition of Metastasio, but incorporate progressive elements with enhanced use of chorus, ballet, and elaborate scenery. In 1793, aided by his reputation as a protégé of Metastasio, he was appointed as court librettist in Vienna, and he took to combining comic and serious features to please Viennese taste.

De Gamerra was politically active, and by his revolutionary attitudes incurred the wrath of Emperor Leopold II, who tried unsuccessfully to block his career. He died in Vicenza.

== Bibliography ==
- Sadie, Stanley (ed.) Mozart and his Operas, MacMillan, 2000 ISBN 0-333-79019-7
- Robbins Landon, H.C. (ed.) The Mozart Compendium, Thames & Hudson, 2nd edition 1996 ISBN 0-500-27884-9
