= Acerbas =

Ancient Roman mythological figure

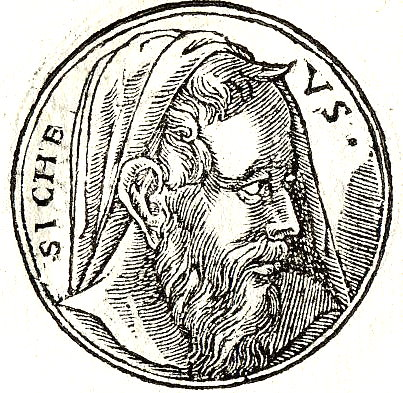
A portrait from the collection of biographies of Promptuarii Iconum Insigniorum (1553)

Acerbas, also named as Sychaeus, was a Tyrian priest of Hercules (that is, Melqart, the Tyrian Hercules), who married Elissa, the daughter of king Mattan I, and sister of Pygmalion. He was possessed of considerable wealth, which, knowing the avarice of Pygmalion, who had succeeded his father, he concealed in the earth. But Pygmalion, who heard of these hidden treasures, had Acerbas murdered, in hopes that through his sister he might obtain possession of them. But the prudence of Elissa saved the treasures, and she emigrated from Phoenicia. They landed and settled in North Africa, founding the city of Carthage. The name Acerbas (Sicharbas, Zacherbas) can be equated with the name Zakar-Baal, king of Byblos mentioned in the Egyptian Story of Wenamun (c. 1000 BCE).

In this account Acerbas is the same person as Sychaeus, and Elissa the same as Dido in Virgil. The names in Justin are undoubtedly more correct than in Virgil; for Servius remarks, that Virgil here, as in other cases, changed a foreign name into one more convenient to him, and that the real name of Sychaeus was Sycharbas, which seems to be identical with Acerbas.
