= The Wandering Prince of Troy =

Song

"The Wandering Prince of Troy" is an early modern ballad that provides an account of the interactions between Aeneas, the mythical founder of Rome, and Dido, queen of Carthage. Although the earliest surviving copy of this ballad dates to c. 1630, the records of the Stationers' Register show that it was first licensed to Thomas Colwell for printing nearly seventy years prior in c. 1564 or 1565. The narrative of the ballad loosely parallels the events in books 1–4 of Virgil's Aeneid and the seventh epistle of Ovid's Heroides. Like many ballads from the period, "The Wandering Prince of Troy" was frequently reprinted in broadside format. Various copies of such broadside facsimiles exist today in multiple libraries: the National Library of Scotland, the British Library, the library at the University of Glasgow, and the library at Magdalene College, Cambridge. Online facsimiles of the ballad broadsides are also available.

== Synopsis ==
The ballad begins by briefly describing the fall of Troy. Asserting that "Corn now grows where Troy-town stood" (line 6), the ballad then moves immediately into Aeneas's arrival at Carthage following his flight from Troy. Welcomed by Dido, Carthage's Queen, with a feast, Aeneas tells the tale of Troy's fall "With Words so sweet and Sighs so deep, / that oft he made them all to Weep" (lines 23–24). Following Aeneas's grand tale, all leave the feast and go to sleep, save for Dido who finds herself unable to sleep, kept awake by her desire for Aeneas. As dawn arrives, Dido is then distraught to learn that Aeneas and the Trojans have left Carthage. Dido's desire thus turns into despair; sobbing, she cries out for death to end the pain in her heart, and stabs herself in the chest. Following Dido's funeral, her sister Anna writes to Aeneas to tell him of his part in Dido's suicide. Upon reading the letter, Dido's ghost appears to Aeneas and she demands that he join her as a spirit; while Aeneas pleads with Dido that she not take him, his pleas are in vain. The ballad ends as a group of "ugly fiends" (line 134) come to take Aeneas's body away.

The form of the ballad, while maintaining some conventions of ballad meter, does not perfectly conform to it and instead appears to be more of a variant of ballad meter than its epitome. "The Wandering Prince of Troy" is a ballad of twenty-three stanzas, all six lines long (see sestet), and all following iambic tetrameter. Each stanza follows a general ABABCC rhyme scheme, although a number of stanzas permit the first and third lines not to rhyme (a convention for which ballad meter allowed). In these cases, the rhyme scheme would be more appropriately scanned as ABCBDD. The ballad is set to a popular early modern tune, that of "Queen Dido", a fact which is marked beneath the title on each copy of the ballad.

== Surviving copies ==
At least nine surviving facsimiles of the ballad exist today in various collections. Three survive in the Crawford collection at the National Library of Scotland; one is in the Roxburghe collection of the British Library; three are in the Euing collection at the University of Glasgow; and two survive in the Pepys Library at Magdalene College, Cambridge.

Of these surviving copies, all nine have woodcut illustrations accompanying the ballad text; however, none of the illustrations depict images that are definitively carved of Aeneas or Dido (woodcuts were known to have been reused by printers quite frequently). Among the images the woodcuts depict are ships, a man on a horse, a fortress with a woman inside and knights on horses without, and two different images of a man and a woman reaching out to one another.

In addition, these nine ballads, while all sharing the title "The Wandering Prince of Troy", possess three different prefaces to the title. The earliest dated facsimile, held in the Pepys collection and estimated to have been printed ca. 1630, provides the complete title as "A proper new Ballad, intituled, The wandering Prince of Troy". One more facsimile shares this title, this one held by the Euing collection. The second complete title, "An excellent Ballad, Intituled, The Wandering Prince of Troy", was first printed sometime between 1663 and 1674; this ballad is also held by the Euing collection, and the remaining ballads printed through the end of the 17th century maintain this full title. Finally, of the nine copies of the ballad, merely one is dated in the 18th century. Possessed by the Roxburghe collection, its complete title is "An Excellent OLD BALLAD, entitled, / The Wandering PRINCE of TROY". What these differing titles suggest is that printers' (and perhaps consumers') senses of a ballad's place in time changed as time passed; labeling something as "new", "excellent" or "old" was perhaps something of a selling technique to market a ballad either people have never heard of, perhaps love, or have not heard in a very long time.

== Differences between the ballad and the Aeneid ==
There are myriad distinct differences between "The Wandering Prince of Troy" and the books concerning Aeneas and Dido's relationship in Virgil's epic. Foremost among these differences is Dido's dying wish for Aeneas: where, in the ballad, Dido's sister writes to Aeneas explaining that Dido prayed on her deathbed for Aeneas to find prosperity, in the Aeneid Dido predicts the existence of eternal strife and hatred between her descendants and Aeneas's descendants, foreshadowing the Punic Wars. In addition, where Aeneas spends a year in Carthage in Virgil's work, the ballad indicates that Aeneas fails to spend even an entire night. Thus, the ballad's final stanzas describing the hero's departure for Rome and his subsequent interactions with Dido's ghost also appear to be in conflict with Virgil's account of Aeneas's departure from Carthage. Rather than end with an encounter between Aeneas and Dido's ghost, eight more books exist in the Aeneid after his departure, telling of his travels to Italy and the underworld, and the wars he fights so that his descendants may ultimately found Rome.
