= Christophe Cochet =

French sculptor

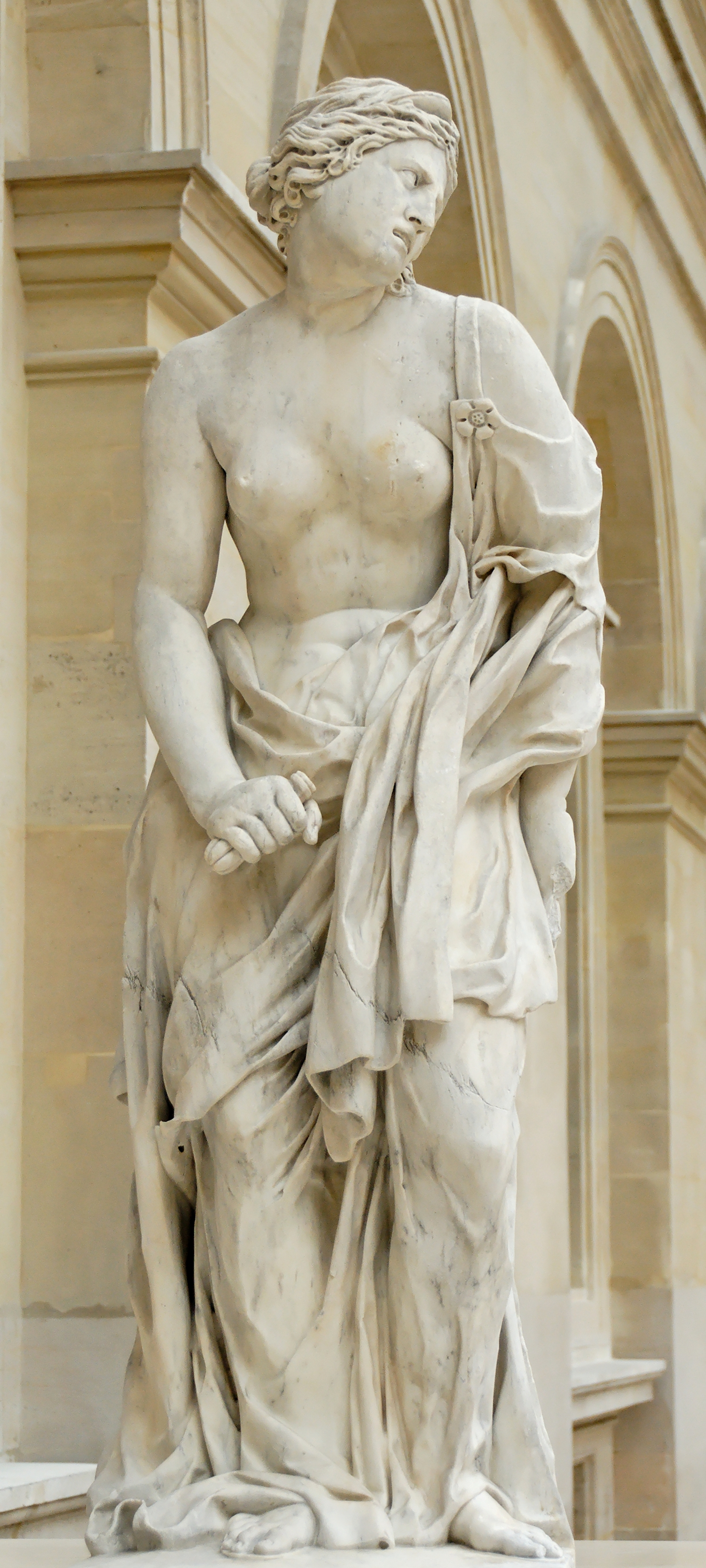
Dido, attributed to Christophe Cochet - formerly at the Château de Marly, now at the Louvre.

Christophe Cochet, known in Rome under the name Cristoforo Coscetti or Coscietti (attested after 1606 - death 1634) was a 17th-century French sculptor.

Son of the Parisian master mason Jean Cochet, he began training as a sculptor with Pierre Biard the Elder, and was already a sculptor when first mentioned in 1606. His sister, Germaine Cochet, married the sculptor Simon Guillain in 1612.

Christophe Cochet went to Rome, where his presence is attested since 1615, and where he stayed alongside the painter Simon Vouet, at a house on Via Serena, in the parish of San Lorenzo in Lucina. During his stay in Rome he was maintained by the Queen Mother Marie de' Medici who granted him an annual allowance, which was known to reach 400 Livres in 1618. In Rome he met with several artists, including sculptor Jacques Sarazin. No work of his Roman period is known to have survived.

Back in Paris at 1629, he became the official “Sculptor to the King and the Queen Mother." Queen Mother Marie de' Medici commissioned him to execute stucco work at the Luxembourg Palace, for which he received various payments until 1630. (In 1631, when the Queen Mother was forced from court following the "Day of the Dupes", work on the Luxembourg was interrupted.)

His first marriage was to Marie Passart, who bore him a son, the painter Dominique Cochet. From his second marriage - in 1630 with Anne Chauchet, daughter of a wine merchant - he had two daughters (including Antoinette, who was born in 1634).

He is best known for creating “Dido About to Take Her Own life” offered by the Duke of Montmorency to Cardinal Richelieu (before 1632). The sculpture was praised by men of letters of the time, including Tristan Lhermite. This might be the Dido originally displayed at the Château de Marly (nowadays at the Louvre in Paris), which was previously identified as a Lucretia or Cleopatra (all of them known for a dramatic suicide).

Cochet was also the creator of several sculpted funerary monuments: he was engaged in 1631 to realize the tomb of Roland Neuburg (died 1629) for the Saint-Pierre-et-Saint-Paul Church at Sarcelles. The monument, in the form of a praying man perched on a high pedestal flanked by torch-bearing geniuses, is lost - but remains known due to an anonymous drawing preserved at the Bibliothèque Nationale in Paris.

In 1631 he got the order, for the large sum of 11,000 Livres, for the Mausoleum of Charles de Bourbon, Count of Soissons (died in 1612), and his wife Anne de Montafié, Countess of Clermont-en-Beauvaisis – erected in the Choir of the Church of the Chartreuse in Gaillon. The monument is in the form of two effigies placed on a high pedestal of black marble, shown in the clothing of a Prince of the Blood and his spouse. At the corners are white marble allegories of the four cardinal virtues, as well as various funerary spirits. In the niches at the base are depicted in white marble the recumbent figures of Elisabeth (died in 1611) and Anne-Charlotte (died 1623), daughters of the Duke and Duchess.

== Bibliography ==
- Geneviève Bresc-Bautier, « Un grand ami de Vouet et de Simon Guillain, le sculpteur Cristofle Cochet », in Geneviève Bresc-Bautier (ed.), La sculpture en Occident. Études offertes à Jean-René Gaborit, Dijon, Faton, 2007, pp. 163–171.
