= Medonte (Sarti) =

Opera by Giuseppe Sarti

- Opera seria by Giuseppe Sarti
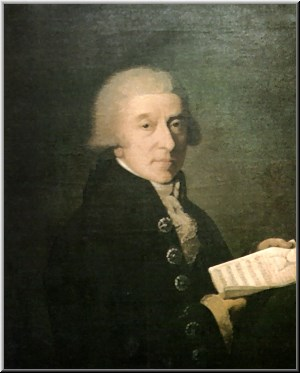
- Giuseppe Sarti
- Librettist: Giovanni de Gamerra
- Language: Italian
- Premiere: 8 September 1777; Teatro della Pergola, Florence

Medonte, re di Epiro ("Medonte, King of Epirus") is an opera seria in three acts by Giuseppe Sarti. The libretto was by Giovanni de Gamerra for Felice Alessandri's opera Medonte, re d'Epiro (1774) and was later set by several other composers.

== Performance history ==
It was first performed at the Teatro della Pergola in Florence on 8 September 1777. The opera was very successful in its time.

== Roles ==
Roles, voice types, premiere cast
Role	Voice type	Premiere cast, 8 September 1777 Conductor: Unknown
Medonte, King of Epirus	tenor	Giacomo Panati
Selene, Princess of Argos in love with Arbace	soprano	Rosa Agostini Devizzi
Arbace, Prince of Dodone and a General of Epirus	soprano castrato	Giuseppe Aprile "Sciroletto"
Zelinda	soprano	Antonia Pacini
Evandro	Soprano castrato	Silvestro Fiamenghi
Talete	Contralto castrato	Francesco Casini Papi
