= Didone abbandonata (Sarti) =

1762 opera

- Dramma per musica by Giuseppe Sarti
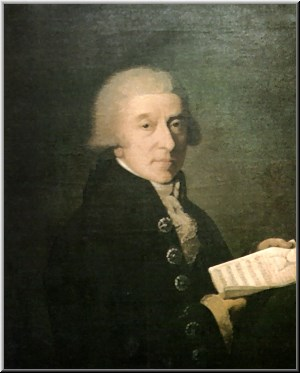
- Giuseppe Sarti
- Librettist: Metastasio
- Language: Italian
- Based on: Dido and Aeneas
- Premiere: 1762; Copenhagen

Didone abbandonata is an opera, or dramma per musica, by Giuseppe Sarti, set to a libretto by the renowned poet Metastasio. The opera was first performed in the winter of 1762 in Copenhagen, and was composed especially for the Danish court of the time. The opera consists of three acts, and the libretto is based upon the well-known story of Dido and Aeneas.

Metastasio's libretto had already been extensively used throughout the century. The most notable of previous adaptations was by Leonardo Vinci.

== Roles ==
Cast	Voice type	Premiere, 1762 (Conductor:Unknown)
Dido	soprano	
Selene	soprano	
Aeneas	soprano	
Iarbas	tenor	
Osmidas	tenor	
Araspes	bass	

== Sources ==
- John A. Rice, "Didone abbandonata", Grove Music Online, ed L. Macy (accessed 2 June 2007), grovemusic.com, subscription access.
