= Fra i due litiganti il terzo gode =

Opera by Giuseppe Sarti

- Dramma giocoso by Giuseppe Sarti
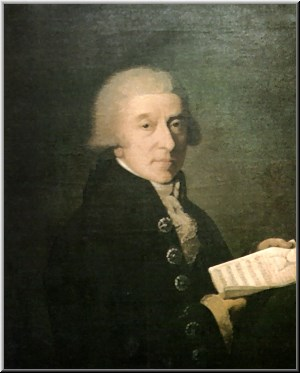
- Giuseppe Sarti
- Language: Italian
- Based on: Carlo Goldoni's Le nozze
- Premiere: 14 September 1782; La Scala, Milan

Fra i due litiganti il terzo gode (While Two Dispute, the Third Enjoys) is a dramma giocoso in two acts by Giuseppe Sarti. The libretto was after Carlo Goldoni's Le nozze (The Marriage).

One aria from this opera, "Come un agnello", is famously quoted by Mozart at the end of Don Giovanni.

== Performance history ==
It was first performed at the Teatro alla Scala in Milan on 14 September 1782. It became very successful, being produced under different names, in different languages, and in numerous European cities. For instance, it was performed as Le nozze di Dorina, with inserted arias by Giovanni Battista Viotti, for the opening of the Théâtre de Monsieur in Paris on 6 January 1791. The work also used music composed by Pasquale Anfossi, Antonio Salieri, and Stephen Storace in addition to the composer himself.

== Roles ==
Roles, voice types, premiere cast
Role	Voice type	Premiere cast, 14 September 1782
Count Belfiore	bass	Giovanni Marliani
Countess Belfiore	soprano	Angela Marzorati
Masotto, steward to the Count and Countess, in love with Dorina	tenor	Antonio Palmini
Dorina. a serving maid	soprano	Nancy Storace
Titta, servant to the Count, also pursuing Dorina	baritone	Francesco Benucci
Mingone, the gardener, likewise interested in Dorina	tenor	Giuseppe Lolli
Livietta, the Countess's maid	soprano	Vittoria Moreschi Balzani

== Synopsis ==
The opera has a story similar to Mozart's Le nozze di Figaro (1786) involving complex intrigues between a pair of jealous, quarrelling aristocrats and their servants.
