= Giuseppe Sarti =

Italian opera composer (1729–1802)

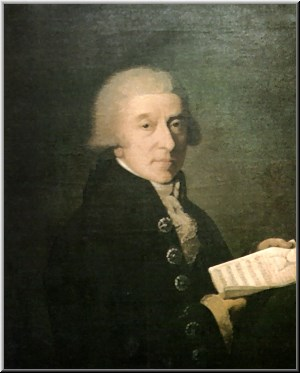
Giuseppe Sarti

Giuseppe Sarti (also Sardi; baptised 1 December 1729 – 28 July 1802) was an Italian opera composer.

== Biography ==
He was born at Faenza. His date of birth is not known, but he was baptised on 1 December 1729 and he died on 28 July 1802. Some earlier sources say he was born on 28 December, but his baptism certificate proves the later date impossible. Already organist at Faenza at age 13, he was invited to receive an education by Padre Martini in Bologna. Resigning his appointment in Faenza in 1750, Sarti devoted himself to the study of dramatic music, becoming director of the Faenza theatre in 1752.

== Opera ==
In 1752 he produced his first documented opera, Il re pastore (because the date of Pompeo in Armenia is not certain). In 1753 Sarti went to Copenhagen with Pietro Mingotti and in 1755 King Frederick V of Denmark appointed him Hofkapellmeister and director of the opera. Here he produced his Ciro riconosciuto.

In 1765 he travelled to Italy to engage some new singers; meanwhile the death of King Frederick put an end to his engagement for the time being. In 1766 he was appointed choir master at the Ospedale della Pietà in Venice, a position he held until 1767. In 1769 he went to London, where he could only survive by giving music lessons. In 1779 he was elected maestro di cappella at the cathedral of Milan, where he remained until 1784. Here he exercised his true vocation of composer, in addition to at least twenty of his most successful operas, a vast amount of sacred music for the cathedral, and educating a number of clever pupils, the most distinguished of whom was Cherubini. In 1784 Sarti was invited by the empress Catherine II to St. Petersburg. On his way there he stopped in Vienna, where Emperor Joseph II received him with special favour, in large part due to his opera Fra i due litiganti il terzo gode, and where he made the acquaintance of Mozart and Salieri. He reached St. Petersburg in 1785 and at once took the direction of the opera, for which he composed many new pieces, besides some very striking sacred music, including a Te Deum for the victory of Ochakov, in which he introduced the firing of real cannons. Sarti founded the Russian Conservatory for Music in 1793. He remained in Russia until 1801, when his health was so broken that he solicited permission to return. The emperor Alexander dismissed him in 1802 with a liberal pension; letters of nobility had been granted to him by empress Catherine. His most successful operas in Russia were Armida e Rinaldo and The Early Reign of Oleg (Nachal'noye upravleniye Olega), for the latter of which the empress herself wrote the libretto. Sarti died in Berlin on his return trip.

Sarti's opera Fra i due litiganti il terzo gode has been immortalized by Mozart, who introduced an air from it (“Come un’agnello”) into the supper scene in Don Giovanni. Earlier, Mozart had also written a short set of piano variations, KV 460, on the same theme.

== Works ==
See List of operas by Giuseppe Sarti

Sonatas for harpsichord and others instruments (in the Satta's thematic catalog)

- S. I: 1 Sonata in D Major for harpsichord and violin or flute (facsimile, SPES 1989)
- S. I: 2 Sonata in D Major for harpsichord and violin (violin is missing)
- S. I: 3 Sonata in e minor for harpsichord and violin or flute (facsimile, SPES 1989)
- S. I: 4 Sonata in G Major for harpsichord and violin or flute (facsimile, SPES 1989)

Sonatas for harpsichord or organ (in the Satta's thematic catalog)

- S. II: 1 Sonata in C Major for harpsichord (critical edition, Ricordi 1979)
- S. II: 2 Sonata in D Major for harpsichord (critical edition with facsimile, Esarmonia 2008)
- S. II: 2a Sonata in D Major for Organ (critical edition with facsimile, Esarmonia 2009)
- S. II: 3 Sonata in D Major for harpsichord (critical edition with facsimile, Esarmonia 2008)
- S. II: 4 Sonata in D Major for harpsichord (critical edition with facsimile, Esarmonia 2008)
- S. II: 5 Sonata in D Major for harpsichord (critical edition with facsimile, Esarmonia 2009)
- S. II: 6 Sonata in D Major for harpsichord (incomplete manuscript)
- S. II: 7 Sonata in E flat Major for harpsichord (critical edition with facsimile, Esarmonia 2009)
- S. II: 8 Sonata in F Major for harpsichord (critical edition, Eurarte 2002)
- S. II: 9 Sonata in G Major for harpsichord (critical edition, Ricordi 1979)
- S. II: 10 Sonata in G Major for harpsichord (critical edition, Ricordi 1979)
- S. II: 11 Sonata in G Major for harpsichord (critical edition, Eurarte 2002)
- S. II: 12 Sonata in G Major for harpsichord (critical edition with facsimile, Esarmonia 2008)
- S. II: 13 Sonata in G Major for harpsichord (critical edition with facsimile, Esarmonia 2008)

== Editions ==
- GIUSEPPE SARTI, Giulio Sabino, ristampa anastatica del facsimile dell’edizione di Vienna, Bologna, Forni [1969], (Bibliotheca musica Bononiensis, sezione IV, n. 128).
- GIUSEPPE SARTI, VI sonate a flauto traversiero solo e basso continuo. Paris, s.d. / III sonate per il cembalo con violino o flauto traverso concertante. Amsterdam s.d., Firenze, SPES 1989 (Archivum Musicum: Flauto Traversiere, 17).
- GIUSEPPE SARTI, Ciro riconosciuto, facsimile a cura di Piero Mioli, Firenze, SPES 2002.
- GIUSEPPE SARTI, Due sonate inedite per clavicembalo (o pianoforte), a cura di R. Satta, Varenna (LC), Eurarte 2002 (Rarità musicali).
- GIUSEPPE SARTI, Sonata Caratteristica "Giulio Sabino ed Epponina", op. 1, a cura di R. Satta, Varenna, Eurarte 2002 (Rarità musicali).
- GIUSEPPE SARTI, Quattro sonate inedite per clavicembalo (organo o pianoforte), a cura di R. Satta (con facsimile), Capua (CE), Esarmonia 2008.
- GIUSEPPE SARTI, Sonata per clavicembalo (organo o pianoforte) in sol maggiore, a cura di Roberto Satta (con facsimile), Capua (CE), Esarmonia 2008.
- GIUSEPPE SARTI, Sonata in mi bemolle maggiore per clavicembalo (organo o pianoforte), a cura di Roberto Satta (con facsimile), Capua (CE), Esarmonia 2009.
- GIUSEPPE SARTI, Due sonate per clavicembalo (organo o pianoforte), a cura di Roberto Satta (con facsimile), Capua (CE), Esarmonia 2009.
- GIUSEPPE SARTI, Aria Questo core io ti donai dall’opera buffa Gli amanti consolati per soprano e pianoforte, a cura di Roberto Satta, Capua (CE), Esarmonia [in preparazione].
- ROBERTO SATTA, Le sonate per clavicembalo o forte piano di Giuseppe Sarti, «Studi e documentazioni – rivista umbra di musicologia», XXI/2, 2002, pp. 23–63.
- ROBERTO SATTA, Intorno a Giuseppe Sarti. Giornata internazionale di studi, «Studi e documentazioni – rivista umbra di musicologia», XXI/2, 2002, pp. 88–90.
- ROBERTO SATTA, L’epoca dello stile galante, «Studi e documentazioni – rivista umbra di musicologia», XXII/2, 2003, pp. 3–42.
- ROBERTO SATTA, Le sonate per tastiera di Giuseppe Sarti: catalogo tematico, «Fonti musicali italiane», XIII, 2008, pp. 93–116.
- ROBERTO SATTA, Giuseppe Sarti. La vita e l'opera, «Studi e documentazioni – rivista umbra di musicologia», XXVIII/1, 2009, pp. 25 – 42.
- ALBINO VAROTTI, L'ambiente in cui operò Giuseppe Sarti musicista europeo. Note su note, «Studi e documentazioni – rivista umbra di musicologia», XXVIII/1, 2009, pp. 43 – 54.
