= Numanus Remulus =

Numanus Remulus is a Rutulian appearing in Book 9 of Virgil's Aeneid. He is the brother-in-law of the Rutulian prince Turnus and is killed by the Trojan prince Ascanius, son of Aeneas and future king of Alba Longa. Numanus is a minor character in the Aeneid and is otherwise unknown in Latin literature; he appears only within the episode in which he is killed in Aeneid 9 (Aen. 9.590-637).

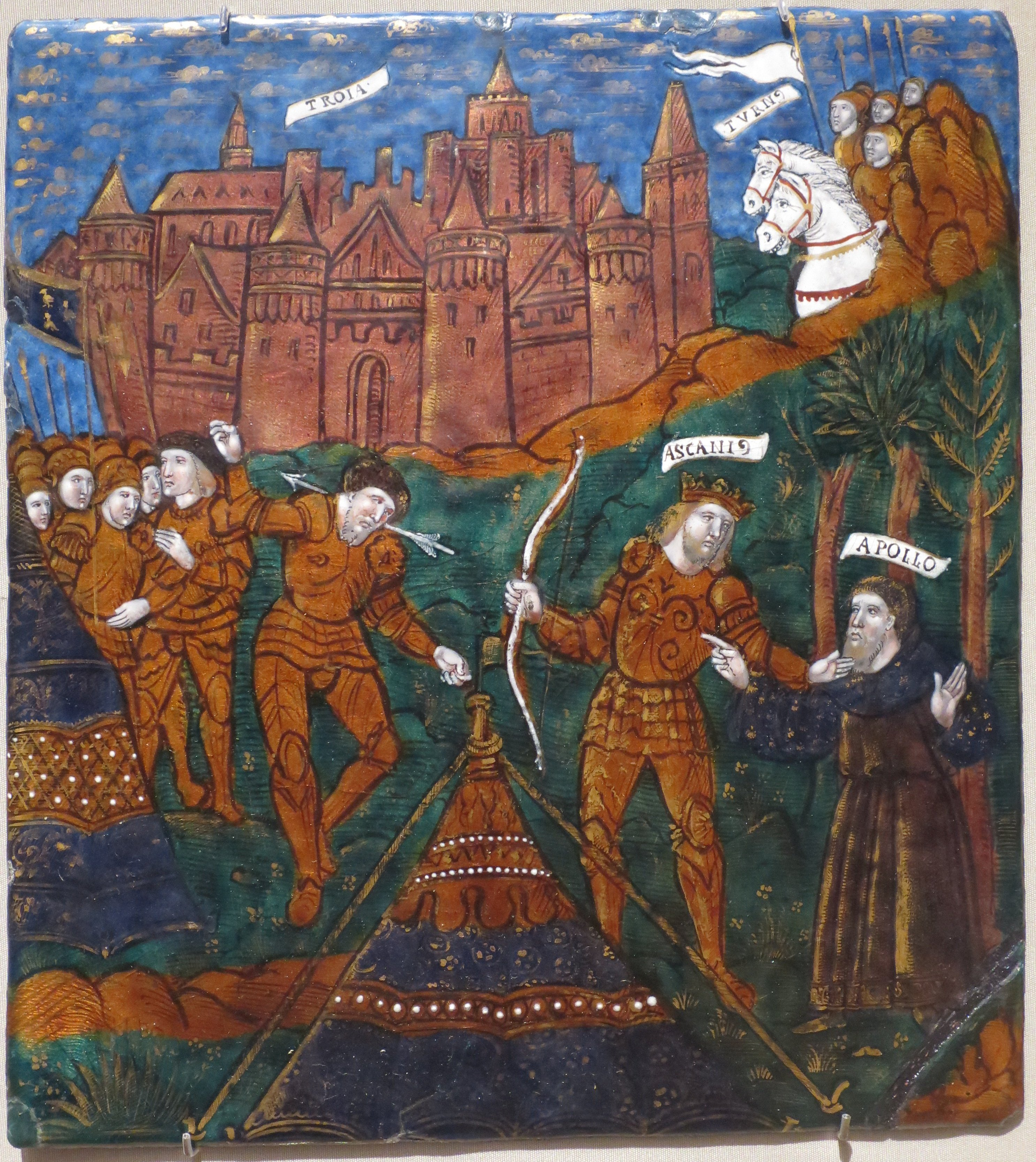
Ascanius Kills Numanus

Virgil uses Numanus to highlight and contrast ancient ethnic stereotypes. Numanus gives a boasting speech (Aen. 9.598–620) which contrasts Italian 'toughness' to the 'softness' of the Trojans (though both Italian and Trojan ethnic groups must come together to form the Roman identity in the Aeneid). Such ethnic contrasts have a long history in ancient epic, going back to Homer. Virgil may also use the episode as a coming-of-age narrative for Ascanius: Numanus is reported to be Ascanius' first kill on the battlefield (Aen. 9.590–592).
