= Lavinia (novel) =

2008 novel by Ursula K. Le Guin

- First edition cover
- Author: Ursula K. Le Guin
- Language: English
- Genre: Parallel novel
- Publisher: Harcourt United States
- Publication date: April 21, 2008
- Publication place: United States
- Media type: Print (Hardcover)
- Pages: 288
- Award: Locus Award for Best Fantasy Novel (2009)
- ISBN: 0-15-101424-8
- OCLC: 145733040
- Dewey Decimal: 813/.54 22
- LC Class: PS3562.E42 L38 2008

Lavinia is a Locus Award-winning novel by American author Ursula K. Le Guin. Published in 2008, it was Le Guin's last novel. It is written in a first-person, self-conscious style that recounts the life of Lavinia, a minor character in Virgil's epic poem the Aeneid.

== Synopsis ==
Lavinia, daughter of the king of the Latins of Laurentum, is sought after for marriage by neighbouring kings, but knows she is destined to marry a stranger. She marries Aeneas from the Trojan War, who arrives with a large body of Trojans.

An agreement is made but then breaks down and there is war, which is won by the outnumbered Trojans. They found a new city called Lavinium, but Aeneas is killed after three years. Aeneas's elder son Ascanius founds Alba Longa and marries but fails to produce an heir. Lavinia removes her son Silvius from his control and he eventually becomes king of the Latins.

Rome already exists, but as a small settlement that plays no part in events.

Lavinia herself retreats from the world and at the end seems to have turned into an owl. All along she has regarded the world she lives in as unreal, a product of Virgil's imagination.

== Background ==
The book is based on the last six books, or the Iliadic half, of the Aeneid. It is written in first-person, with the character Lavinia aware that she may only exist in the context of a story which an outside narrator is recounting.

Throughout the first part of the novel Lavinia holds conversations with "the poet", the shade of a dying Virgil. In their conversations Virgil explains his role as the author of Lavinia's life, and what he reveals to Lavinia about her life she acknowledges and anticipates as she recounts her story. Lavinia therefore only exists in the context of the poem, and through her conversations she is self-aware of her own textuality.

This novel is not meant to be historical. Le Guin says that, "The Trojan War was probably fought in the thirteenth century BC; Rome was founded, possibly, in the eighth, though there is no proper history of it for centuries after that. That Priam's nephew Aeneas of Troy had anything at all to do with the founding of Rome is pure legend, a good deal of it invented by Virgil himself". She also explains that her work is a translation of the last six books of the Aeneid into prose.
