= Shield of Aeneas =

Roman legendary shield

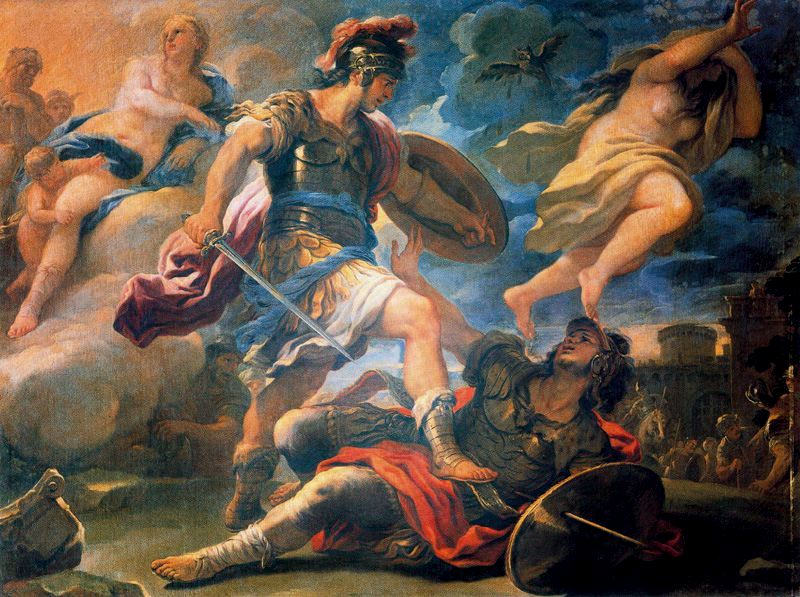
Aeneas defeats Turnus, by Luca Giordano, 1634–1705. Though Virgil's sweeping descriptions cannot be seen, Aeneas is holding his shield in his left hand.

The Shield of Aeneas is the shield that Aeneas receives from the god Vulcan in Book VIII of Virgil's Aeneid to aid in his war against the Rutuli. Imprinted on the front of the shield is a grand depiction of the destiny of Aeneas' descendants and the future of Rome.

This lengthy and intricate description within the epic's narrative represents one of the most famous instances of ekphrasis in extant Roman literature.

== Overview ==
In Book VIII of the Aeneid, Virgil describes how the goddess Venus, hoping to aid her son, urges her spouse, Vulcan, to forge for Aeneas a new shield to protect him in the imminent war against the native inhabitants of Italy. Virgil describes Vulcan as "not unversed in prophecy", that is, able to see the destiny of Aeneas' progeny, Rome:

There the lord with the power of fire, not unversed
in prophecy, and knowledge of the centuries to come,
had fashioned the history of Italy, and Rome's triumphs

— Virgil, Aeneid, Book VIII, lines 626–628

Several key moments in Roman history are depicted on the shield:

1. Romulus and Remus suckling the she-wolf (lines 630–634)
2. The capture of the Sabine women (lines 635–641)
3. The death of Mettius Fufetius (lines 642–645)
4. The Siege of Rome by Porsena (lines 646–654)
5. The Gauls' attack on Rome (lines 655–662)
6. The Battle of Actium (lines 671–713)
7. The Peaceful City, with Augustus Caesar standing triumphant in the center (lines 714–723)

== Interpretations ==
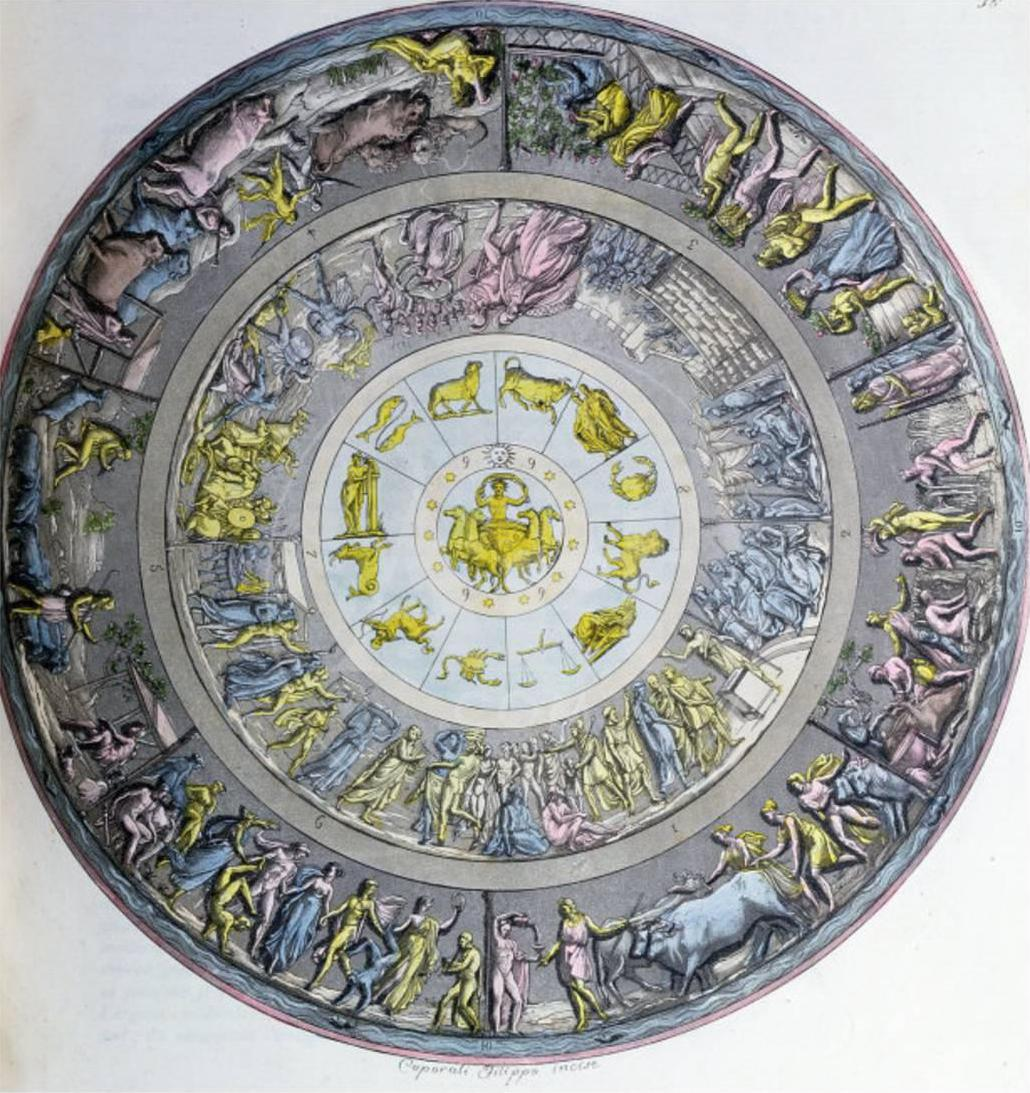
The Shield of Achilles, embellished with similar scenery to the Shield of Aeneas. Interpreted by Angelo Monticelli, from Le Costume Ancien ou Moderne, ca. 1820.

Given that the shield is embellished by lavish pictures and intricate scenes, one of the most immediate interpretations is that the shield was primarily aesthetic in form and thus in function. Some scholars such as Warde Fowler, however, argue that the images depicted on the shield are so salient for Roman history that the shield should not be seen as merely a canvas for a painting. Likewise, Warde argues that the shield is not simply a practical piece of equipment to complement Vulcan's sword. Tempering both suggestions, both Warde and R. D. Williams argue that the shield serves as a symbol and foreshadow of Rome's future glory. Virgil's use of ekphrasis is consistent with Homer, but Williams has noted that the saturation of significant scenes indicates that the shield serves more as a literary tool than a diegetical description. Likewise, both Williams and D. L. West have noted the composition of the shield and Virgil's description of its color, texture, and perspective to emphasize its symbolic quality.

Similar to his own consistent indebtedness to Homer, Virgil is most likely drawing similarities and contrasts to Achilles' shield as described in book 18 of the Iliad. Achilles' shield similarly depicts a set of sweeping images in concentric circles radiating outwards from a central scene of two cities: one at war, the other at peace. John Penwill has noted that, unlike Homer, Virgil reversed the order of images on Achilles' shield, emphasizing the centrality of Rome and the insignificance of barbarian life. Where Homer begins with the elements radiating outwards to the events of man, Virgil begins with Rome. This flattering portrait of Rome is highly consistent throughout the Aeneid and emphasizes the historical context of Rome beset by civil unrest. Virgil composed the Aeneid sometime between 29 and 19 BC in the middle of Rome's transition from Republic into Empire. By linking the founding of Rome to the already accepted body of Homeric literature, Virgil attempted to elevate Rome's stature both politically and symbolically. According to Kimberly Bell, the Aeneid served to "[perpetuate] Augustus's political agenda". With Aeneas wielding the shield in victory, the centrality of Rome coupled with flanking images of Roman triumphs culminating in the ascension of the Caesars links together its symbolic significance with Augustus' political fortunes.
