= Pergamus (Crete) =

Coordinates: 35°31′52″N 23°46′23″E

Pergamus or Pergamos (Ancient Greek: Πέργαμος), or Pergamia or Pergamea, was a town of ancient Crete, to which a mythical origin was ascribed. According to Virgil, it was founded by Aeneas (see Pergamea), according to Velleius Paterculus by Agamemnon, and according to Servius by the Trojan prisoners belonging to the fleet of Agamemnon. Lycurgus, the Spartan legislator, was said to have died at this place, and his tomb was shown there in the time of Aristoxenus. It is said by Servius to have been near Cydonia, and is mentioned by Pliny the Elder in connection with Cydonia. The Periplus of Pseudo-Scylax says that the Dictynnaeum stood in the territory of Pergamus.

The site of Pergamus is tentatively located near modern Ag. Eirini, Grimbiliana.
