= Lavinium =

Ancient Roman port city

Coordinates: 41.661625°N 12.478427°E

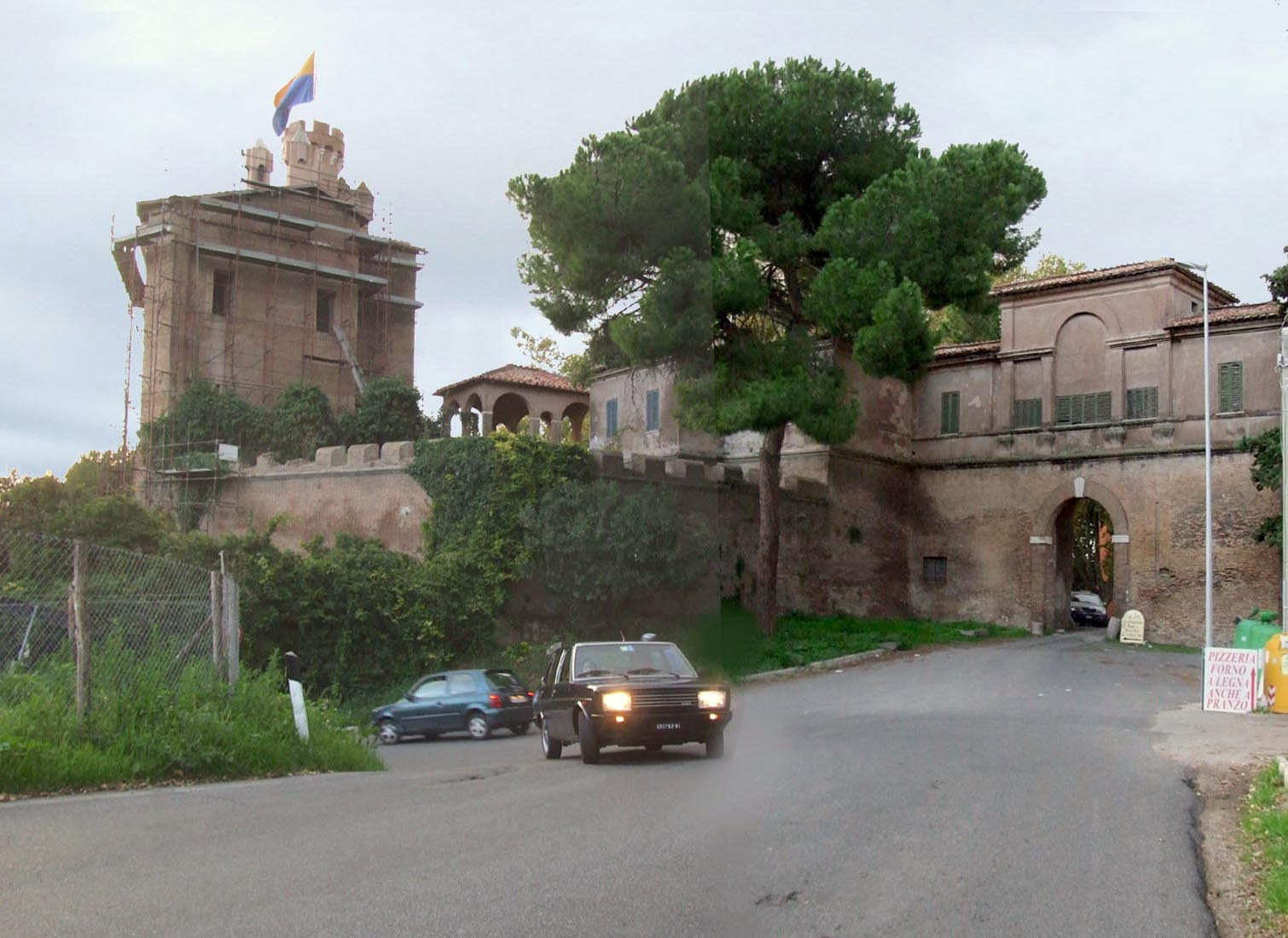
Gate into the interior of the settlement of the frazione of Pratica di Mare, a medieval walled village at the site of the center of ancient Lavinium. The structures in the photograph vary in date. On the left is the Castello Borghese, possibly the site of the Roman arx or citadel. The archaeological excavations are in a field off to the left of the photograph. The comune of Pomezia and the museum are directly behind the photographer.

Lavinium was a port city of Latium, 6 km (3.7 mi) to the south of Rome, midway between the Tiber river at Ostia and Antium. The coastline then, as now, was a long strip of beach. Lavinium was on a hill at the southernmost edge of the Silva Laurentina, a dense laurel forest, and the northernmost edge of the Pontine Marshes, a vast malarial tract of wetlands. The basis for the port, the only one between Ostia and Antium, was evidently the mouth of the Numicus river.

The location of Lavinium has never been lost to historians nor does there appear to have been any significant break in its habitation. Today's settlement remains a walled village of medieval design, Pratica di Mare, in the comune of Pomezia. The latter is a city constructed in 1939 and settled according to a plan of Benito Mussolini, whose engineers completed the millennia-long task of draining and filling the marsh, now the Pontine fields. A brief strip of field separates the large and flourishing city from the village. One Roman gate allows entry into the narrow streets of the village past the Castello Borghese, originally a fortification, purchased along with the village in 1617 by Marcantonio Borghese. The castle and the village were periodically renovated. All that remains of the river that once partly surrounded the village is a small stream, the Fosso di Pratica.

Pratica di Mare is about 6 km (3.7 mi) from the Tyrrhenian Sea near the top of a slope descending to an alluvial shelf on which the Pratica di Mare Air Force Base has been placed. It has the historical distinction of being the airfield from which Otto Skorzeny flew Mussolini to safety in Germany after his rescue from imprisonment in a mountain villa. Today the base is both a secure airport for the protection of distinguished visitors to the Rome region and a home for air shows of advanced aircraft. The Fosso di Pratica was re-routed around the end of a runway; however, today's small brook is in no way compatible with the concept of a port. The sea may well have formerly extended up to the base of the hill, as sites further north, such as Ostia, appear to have retreated one or two miles inland. Ancient Roman seaside villas are no longer on the beach.

== Archaeology ==
Pratica di Mare is observably smaller than ancient Lavinium, whose remains crop out in the surrounding fields. Recent archaeological excavations performed to the south date Lavinium to well before the legendary foundation of Rome. It was already fortified in the 7th century BC and flourishing in the 6th. Lavinium was assimilated by Republican Rome. It was connected to Rome in the north and Ardea to the south by the Via Laurentina. Under the empire it was combined with the mysterious Laurentum, where many wealthy Romans maintained a winter villa, to become Laurolavinium. The nature of the union remains ambiguous.

A number of kilns have been identified within the perimeter of the city walls. Outside the city was a sanctuary dedicated to Sol Indiges and a vast sanctuary with numerous altars, where the bronze inscribed plaque records that the Dioscuri were being venerated at one of numerous altars.

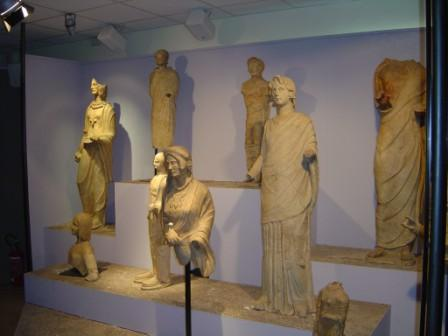
Ex voto statues in the museum at Lavinium

== Legend and history ==
According to Roman mythology, which links Lavinium more securely to Rome, the city was named by Aeneas in honor of Lavinia. Lavinia was the daughter of Latinus, king of the Latins, and his wife Amata. Aeneas reached Italy and there fought a war against Turnus, the leader of the local Rutuli people. Aeneas founded not Rome but rather Lavinium, the main centre of the Latin league, from which the people of Rome sprang. Aeneas thus links the royal house of Troy with the early Roman royal house.

The foundation of Lavinium and the Rutulian war are both mentioned prominently in Virgil's Aeneid.

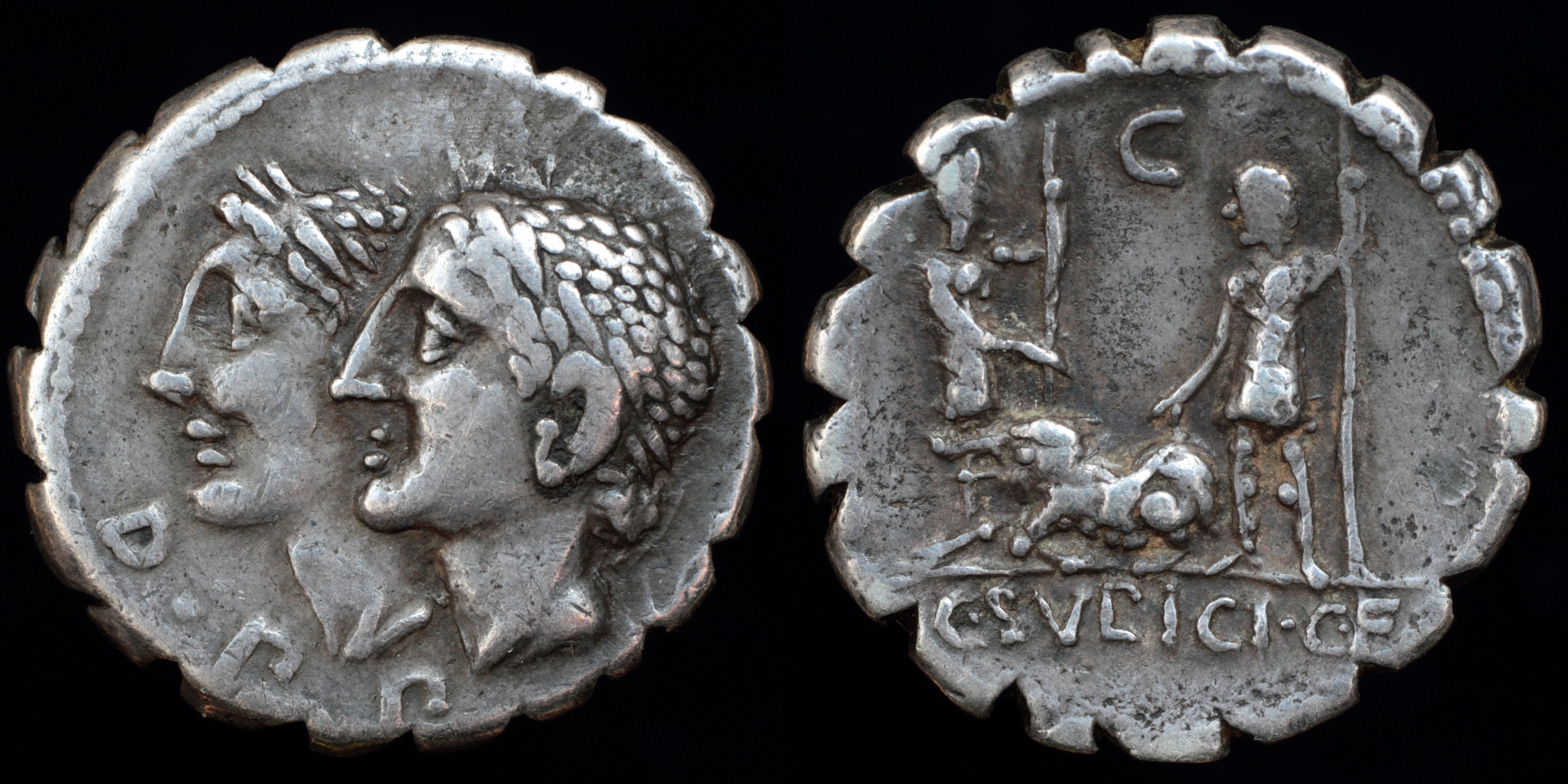
Silver denarius struck by C. Sulpicius C. f. Galba in Rome 106 BC. The Di Penates depicted on the obverse were brought to Lavinium from Troy by Aeneas. The reverse depicts a prophecy from the Aeneid: "in the place where a white sow casts thirty piglets under an oak tree, a new city shall be built." A bronze statue of a sow was placed in the forum of Lavinium.

In ancient times Lavinium had a close association with the nearby Laurentum. According to Livy, in the eighth century BC, when Romulus and Titus Tatius jointly ruled Rome, the ambassadors of the Laurentes came to Rome, but were beaten by Tatius' relatives. The Laurentes complained, but Tatius accorded more weight to the influence of his relatives than to the injury done the Laurentes. When Tatius afterwards visited Lavinium to celebrate an anniversary sacrifice, he was slain in a tumult. Romulus declined to go to war and instead renewed the treaty between Rome and Lavinium.

In 509 BC, after the overthrow of the Roman monarchy, one of Rome's first two consuls Lucius Tarquinius Collatinus was coerced into leaving Rome because of his relation to the kings. He voluntarily went into exile in Lavinium.

In around 488 BC, Lavinium was captured by an invading army of the Volsci, led by Gaius Marcius Coriolanus and Attius Tullus Aufidius.
