= Lavinia =

Wife of Aeneas in Roman mythology

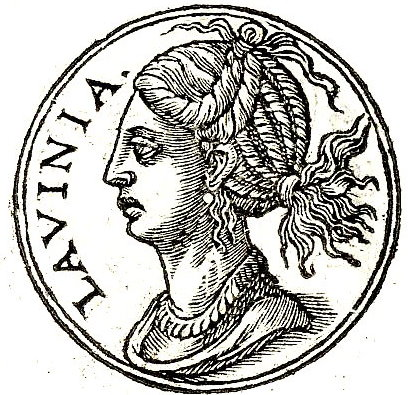
Lavinia from Promptuarii Iconum Insigniorum

Lavinia (/ləˈvɪniə/ lə-VIN-ee-ə; Latin: [ɫaːˈu̯iːnia]) is the last wife of Aeneas in Roman mythology. In the standard version of the story, she is the daughter of King Latinus and Amata. Aeneas names the Latin town of Lavinium after her.

== Story ==
In Virgil's account, Lavinia, the only child of the king and "ripe for marriage", had been courted by many men who hoped to become the king of Latium. Turnus, ruler of the Rutuli, was the most likely of the suitors, having the favor of Queen Amata. King Latinus is warned by his father Faunus in a dream oracle that his daughter is not to marry a Latin:

"Propose no Latin alliance for your daughter
Son of mine; distrust the bridal chamber
Now prepared. Men from abroad will come
And be your sons by marriage. Blood so mingled
Lifts our name starward. Children of that stock
Will see all earth turned Latin at their feet,
Governed by them, as far as on his rounds
The Sun looks down on Ocean, East or West."

Lavinia has what is perhaps her most, or only, memorable moment of the Aeneid in Book 7, lines 94–104: during a sacrifice at the altars of the gods, her hair catches fire, an omen promising glorious days to come for Lavinia and war for all Latins:

"While the old king lit fires at the altars
With a pure torch, the girl Lavinia with him,
It seemed her long hair caught, her head-dress caught
In crackling flame, her queenly tresses blazed,
Her jeweled crown blazed. Mantled then in smoke
And russet light, she scattered divine fire
Throughout all the house. No one could hold that sight
Anything but hair-raising, marvelous,
And it was read by seers to mean the girl
Would have renown and glorious days to come,
But that she brought a great war on her people."

Not long after the dream oracle and the prophetic moment, Aeneas sends emissaries bearing several gifts for King Latinus. King Latinus recognizes Aeneas as the destined one:

"I have a daughter, whom the oracles
Of Father's shrine and warning signs from heaven
Keep me from pledging to a native here.
Sons from abroad will come, the prophets say—
For this is Latium's destiny—new blood
To immortalize our name. Your king's the man
Called for by fate, so I conclude, and so
I wish, if there is truth in what I presage."

Aeneas is said to have named the ancient city of Lavinium for her.

By some accounts, Aeneas and Lavinia had a son, Silvius, a legendary king of Alba Longa. According to Livy, Ascanius was the son of Aeneas and Lavinia; she led the Latins as a power behind the throne since Ascanius was too young to rule. In Livy's account, Silvius is the son of Ascanius.

Other accounts make Lavinia the daughter of King Anios from the Greek island of Delos, who gives her in marriage to Aeneas.

It has been proposed that the character was in part intended to represent Servilia Isaurica, Emperor Augustus's first fiancée.

== Reception ==
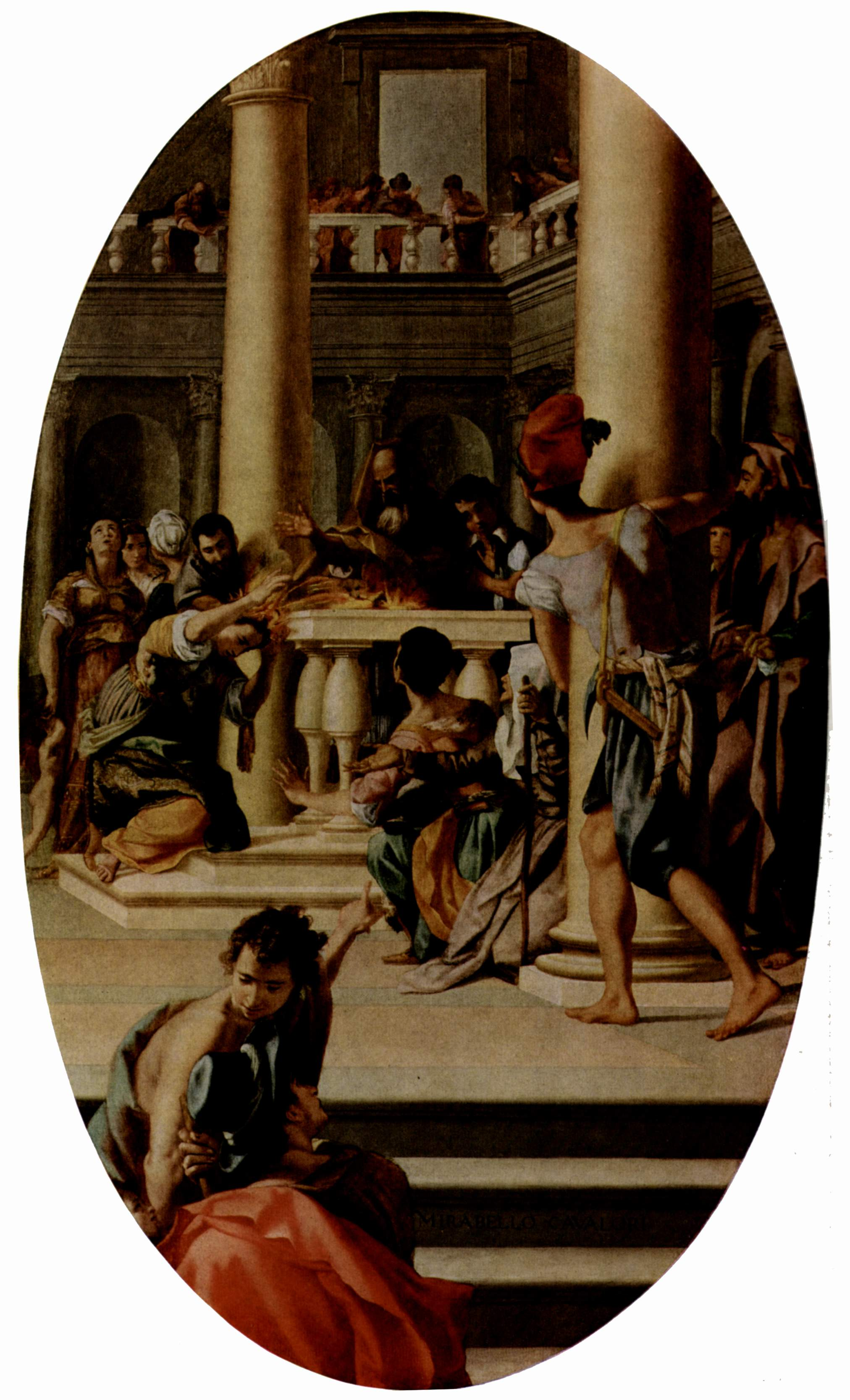
Lavinia at the Altar (c. 1565) by Mirabello Cavalori, depicting the moment at which Lavinia's hair blazes as an omen of war but ultimate reconciliation

Lavinia appears with her father, King Latinus, in Dante's Divine Comedy, Inferno, Canto IV, lines 125–126. She is documented in De Mulieribus Claris, a collection of biographies of historical and mythological women by the Florentine author Giovanni Boccaccio, composed in 1361–62.

In Ursula K. Le Guin's 2008 novel Lavinia, Lavinia's character and her relationship with Aeneas is expanded, giving insight into the life of a king's daughter in ancient Italy. Le Guin employs a self-conscious narrative device in having Lavinia as the first-person narrator knowing that she would not have a life without Virgil, who, being the writer of the Aeneid several centuries after her time, is thus her creator.
