= Ascanius =

Figure in Roman legendary lore

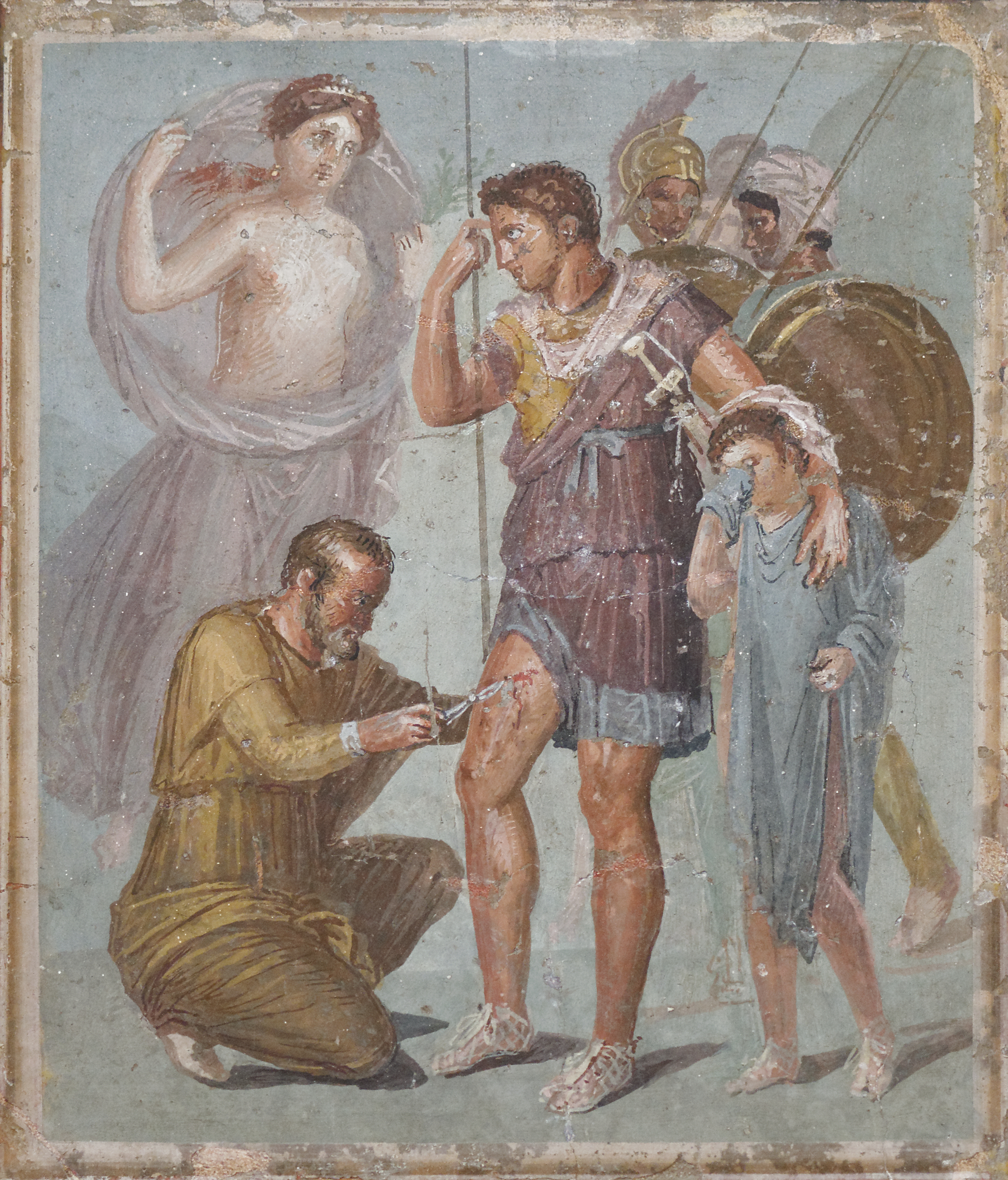
The boy Ascanius weeps and Venus hovers nearby as the physician Iapyx treats the wound of Aeneas (wall painting from Pompeii, 1st century AD).

Ascanius (/əˈskeɪniəs/; Ancient Greek: Ἀσκάνιος) was a legendary king of Alba Longa (traditional reign: 1176 BC to 1138 BC) and the son of the Trojan hero Aeneas and of Creusa, daughter of Priam. He is a significant figure in Roman mythology because of his family connections: as the son of the Roman ancestor-figure Aeneas (himself the son of the goddess Venus and the Trojan prince Anchises), and as a forebear of the Roman people. Under his additional name Iulus, he was claimed as the particular ancestor of the gens Iulia, the family of Julius Caesar, and therefore a progenitor of the first line of Roman emperors, the Julio-Claudian dynasty. Some Roman genealogies also make him an ancestor of Romulus and Remus, the founders of the city of Rome itself.

Like his father, Ascanius appears as a major character in Virgil's Aeneid.

== Mythology ==
In Greek and Roman mythology, Ascanius was the son of the Trojan prince Aeneas and Creusa, daughter of Priam. After the Trojan War, as the city burned, Aeneas escaped to Latium in Italy, taking his father Anchises and his child Ascanius with him, though Creusa died during the escape.

According to Dionysius of Halicarnassus, Ascanius's original name was Euryleon and this name was changed to Ascanius after his flight from Troy. According to Virgil, Ascanius was also called Iulus or Julus. The gens Julia, the clan to which Julius Caesar belonged, claimed descent from Ascanius/Iulus, his father Aeneas, and, ultimately, the goddess Venus, the mother of Aeneas in myth, his father being the mortal Anchises.

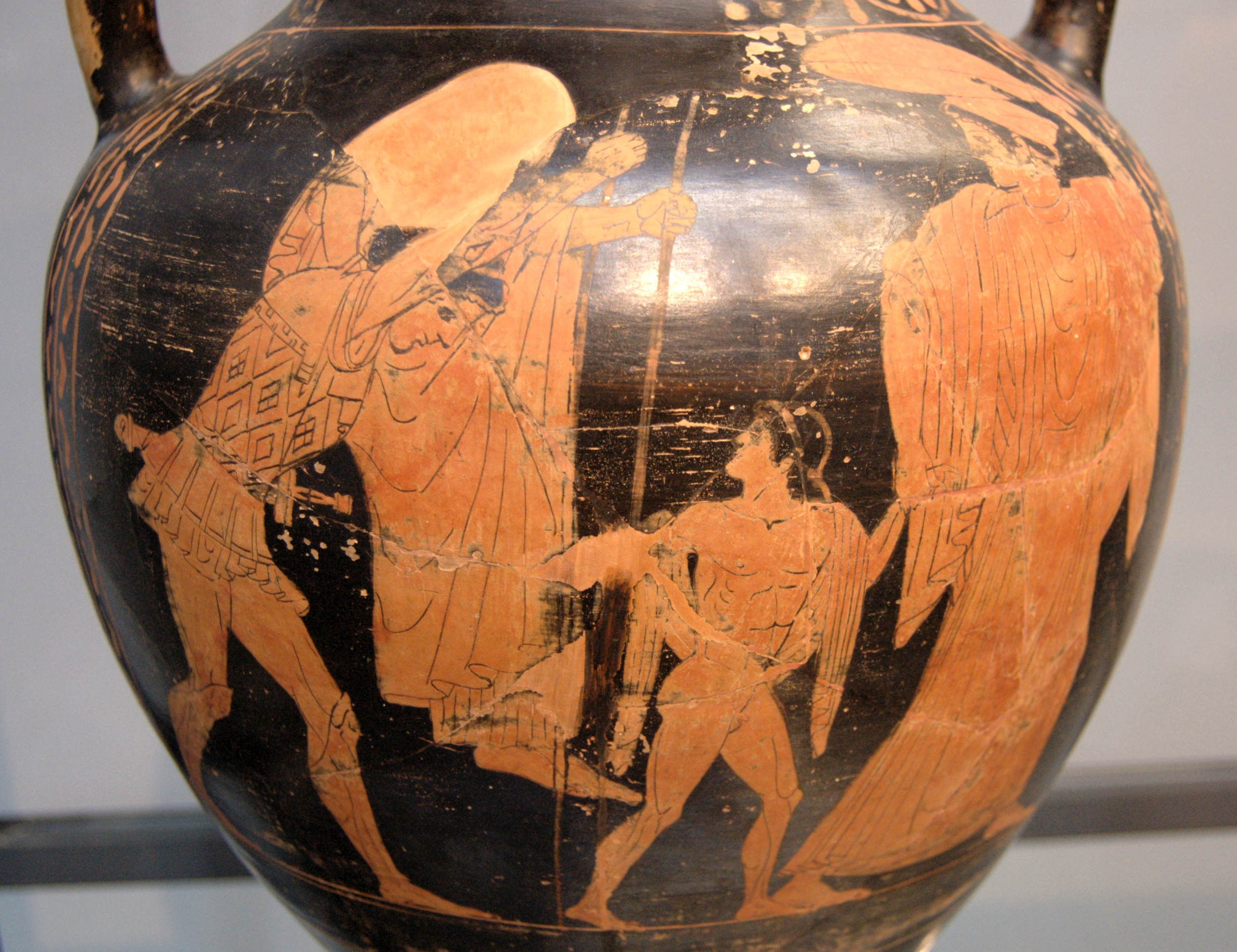
Aeneas carrying Anchises, with his wife leading the way and Ascanius between them (red-figure amphora from a Greek workshop in Etruria, ca. 470 BC)

Dionysius however, identified Julus as a son of Ascanius who disputed the succession of the kingdom of Alba Longa with Silvius, upon the death of Ascanius.

According to another legend mentioned by Livy, Ascanius may have been the son of Aeneas and Lavinia and thus born in Latium, not Troy. Ascanius later fought in the Italian Wars along with his father Aeneas.

After the death of Aeneas, Ascanius became king of Lavinium and an Etruscan king named Mezentius took advantage of the occasion to besiege the city. Mezentius succeeded in making the city surrender and agree to pay a yearly tribute. Upon his retirement, Ascanius fell upon him and his army unaware and entirely defeated Mezentius and killed his son Lausus. Mezentius was forced to agree to pay a yearly tribute. Subsequent to this, exactly thirty years after the founding of Lavinium, Ascanius founded the city of Alba Longa and became its first king. He left Lavinia in charge of the city of Lavinium. Ascanius was succeeded by Silvius, who was either his younger brother or his son. Ascanius died in the 28th year of his reign.

== Aeneid ==
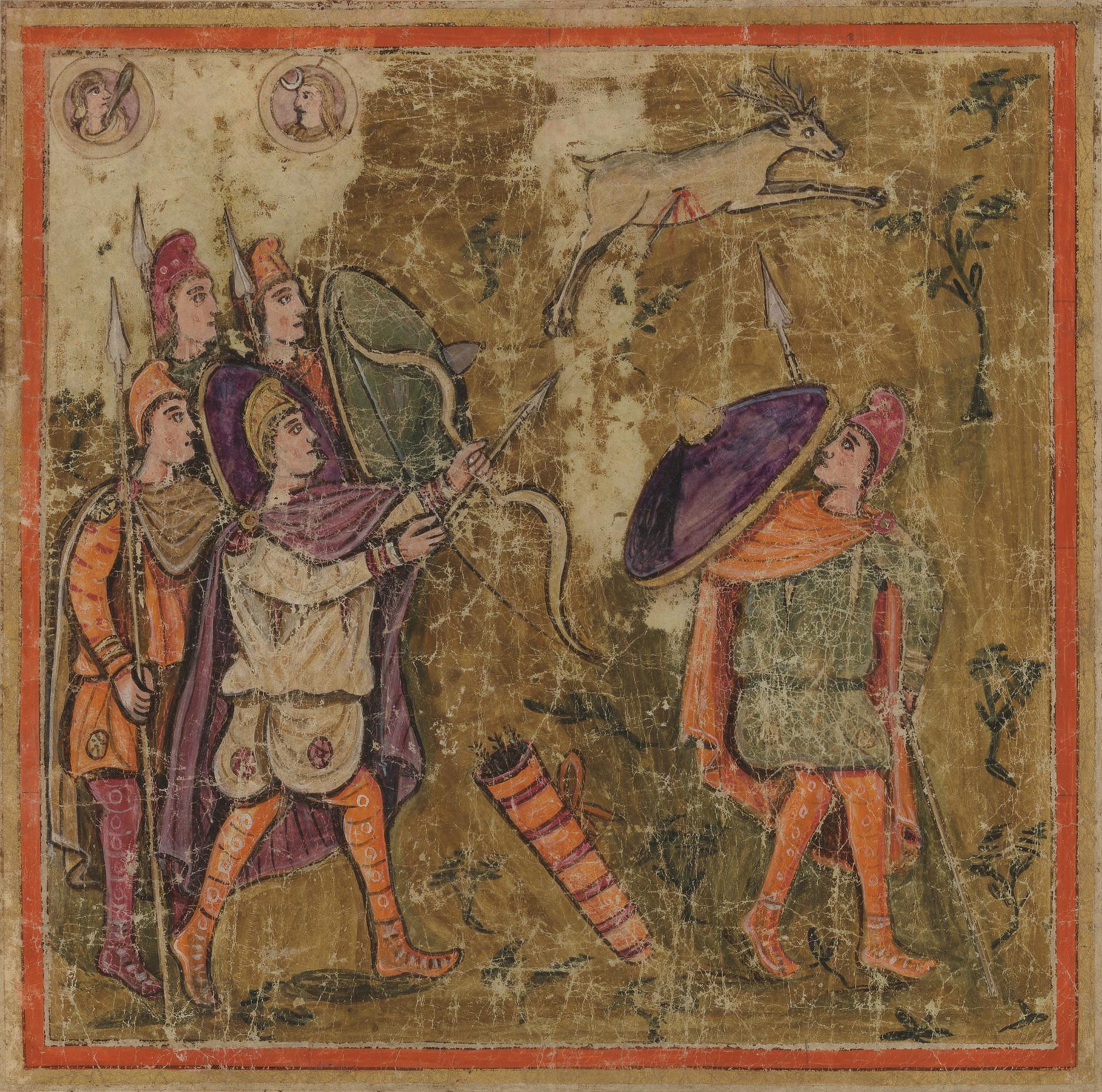
Ascanius shooting Sylvia's stag, in the 5th-century Roman Vergil manuscript

However, in the Aeneid, Virgil claims that Mezentius fought in the Italian Wars at the time Aeneas was alive. In the Aeneid, it is Aeneas who kills Lausus after harming Mezentius, who escaped while his son faced the Trojan king. When the news about Lausus' death reaches Mezentius, he comes back to face Aeneas, and is killed too. In this account, Ascanius does not participate in these deaths.

Nevertheless, Virgil shows Ascanius's first experience at war. In the Aeneid, Ascanius is a teenager without real war experiences, but while besieged by the Italians, Ascanius launches an arrow against Numanus, the husband of the youngest sister of Turnus. After killing Numanus, Apollo comes and says to Ascanius:

Macte nova virtute, puer: sic itur ad astra, dis genite et geniture deos.

This phrase can be translated into English as: "Go forth with new value, boy: thus is the path to the stars; son of gods that will have gods as sons." or "Blessings on your fresh courage, boy, scion of gods and ancestor of gods yet to be, so it is man rises to the stars." In this verse, Virgil makes a clear reference to the offspring of Iulus, from whom Augustus Caesar claimed descent. Therefore, in this verse Virgil refers to the Gens Julia, the family of Augustus and Julius Caesar, who was deified after his death.

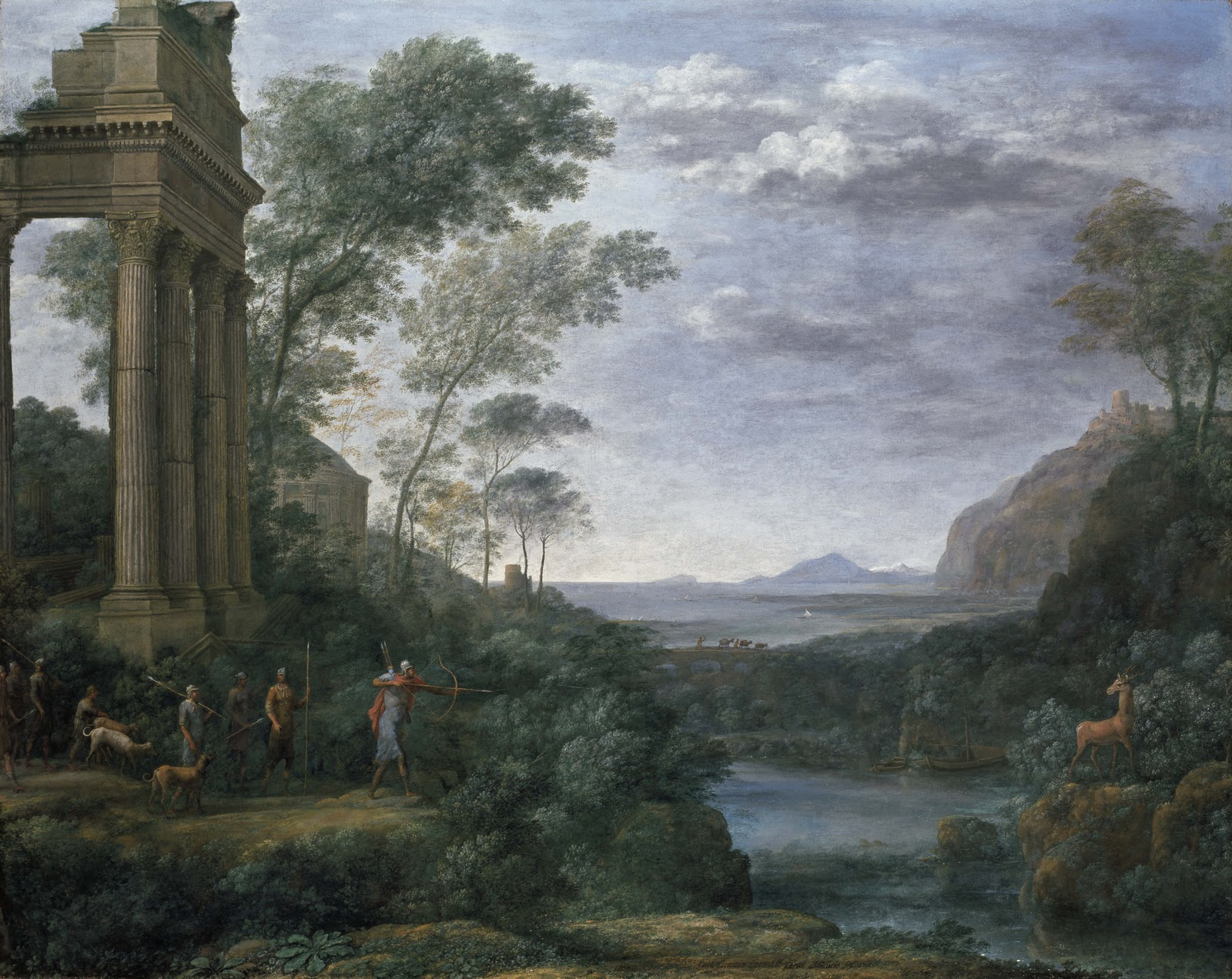
Landscape with Ascanius Shooting the Stag of Sylvia (1682), Claude Lorrain's last painting

Sic itur ad astra become proverbial, and several mottos use an ad astra phrase. After this episode, Apollo orders to the Trojans to keep Ascanius away from the war.

In this same episode Ascanius, before launching the fatal arrow in Numanus, prays to Jupiter, saying: Jupiter omnipotens, audacibus annue cœptis ("Omnipotent Jupiter, please favour my bold attempt"). The last part of the hexameter became the United States motto annuit coeptis.

The name Iulus was popularised by Virgil in the Aeneid: replacing the Greek name Ascanius with Iulus linked the Julian family of Rome to earlier mythology. The emperor Augustus, who commissioned the work, was a great patron of the arts. As a member of the Julian family, he could claim to have four major Olympian gods in his family tree: (Jupiter, Juno, Venus and Mars), so he encouraged his many poets to emphasize his supposed descent from Aeneas.

== See also ==
- Augustan literature
- Gens Julia
- Kingdom of Rome
- The Golden Bough (mythology)

== Notes ==
Legendary titles
Preceded by Aeneas	King of Alba Longa	Succeeded by Silvius
