= Pergamea =

Until at last we glide to the ancient shores of Crete. Eagerly setting to work on the walls of my chosen city, I name it Pergamea.

— Virgil, Aeneid

Pergamea is a fictional settlement in the Aeneid, the epic poem written by Virgil between 29 and 19 BC.

Pergamea is the name of the city that Aeneas and his crew began to found on the island of Crete. In Delos, Apollo had delivered them an oracle telling them that they would found a new city in their homeland.

Aeneas and his men had misinterpreted this to mean Crete, but the oracle had meant Italy. When they began to build the city, they were struck down with disease. Apollo appeared to Aeneas in a dream and told him that they were at the wrong place and that they should push on to Italy.
