= Aeneid =

Latin epic poem by Virgil

- by Virgil
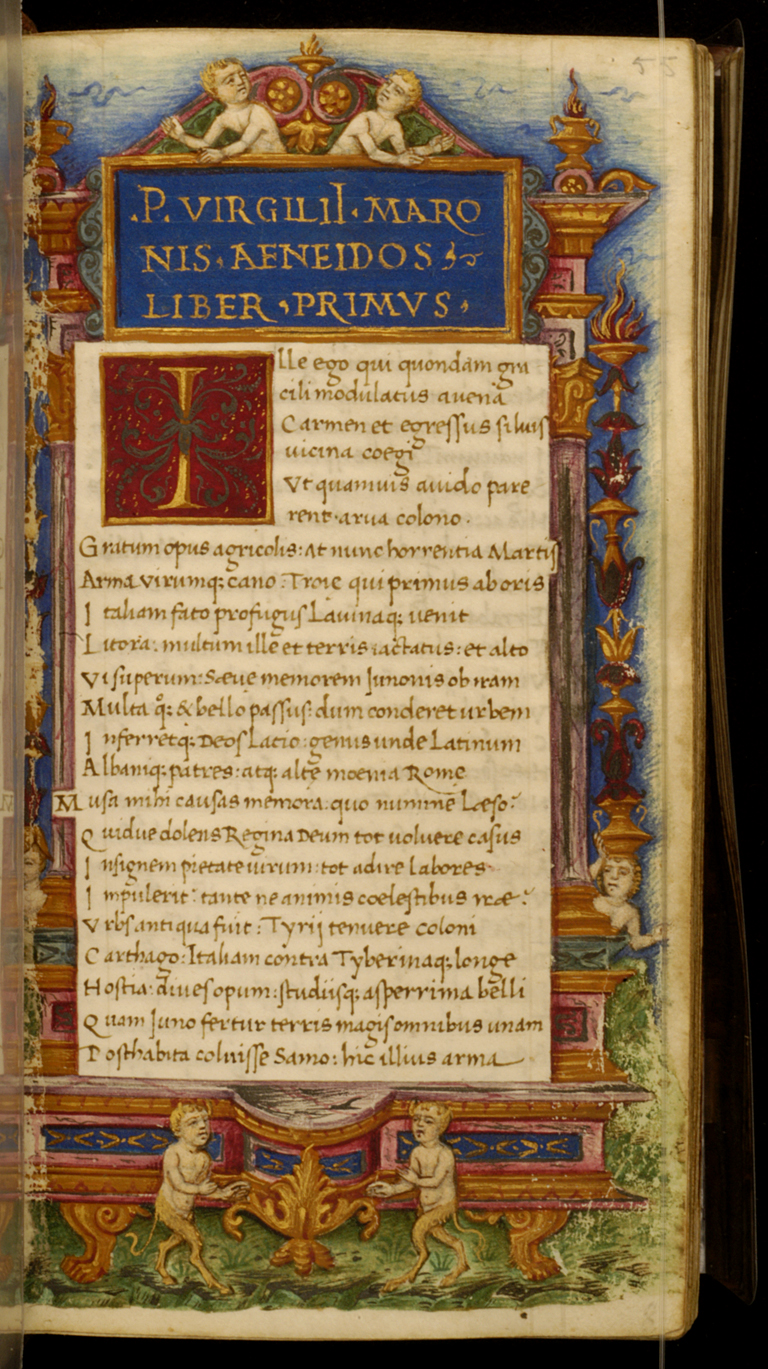
- Manuscript circa 1470, Cristoforo Majorana
- Original title: AENEIS
- Translator: John Dryden; Henry Howard, Earl of Surrey; Seamus Heaney; Allen Mandelbaum; Robert Fitzgerald; Robert Fagles; Frederick Ahl; Sarah Ruden
- Written: 29–19 BC
- First published in: 19 BC
- Country: Roman Republic, Roman Empire
- Language: Classical Latin
- Subject(s): Epic Cycle, Trojan War, Founding of Rome
- Genre: Epic poem
- Meter: Dactylic hexameter
- Publication date: 1469
- Published in English: 1697; 329 years ago
- Media type: Manuscript
- Lines: 9,896
- Preceded by: Georgics

Full text
- Aeneid at Wikisource

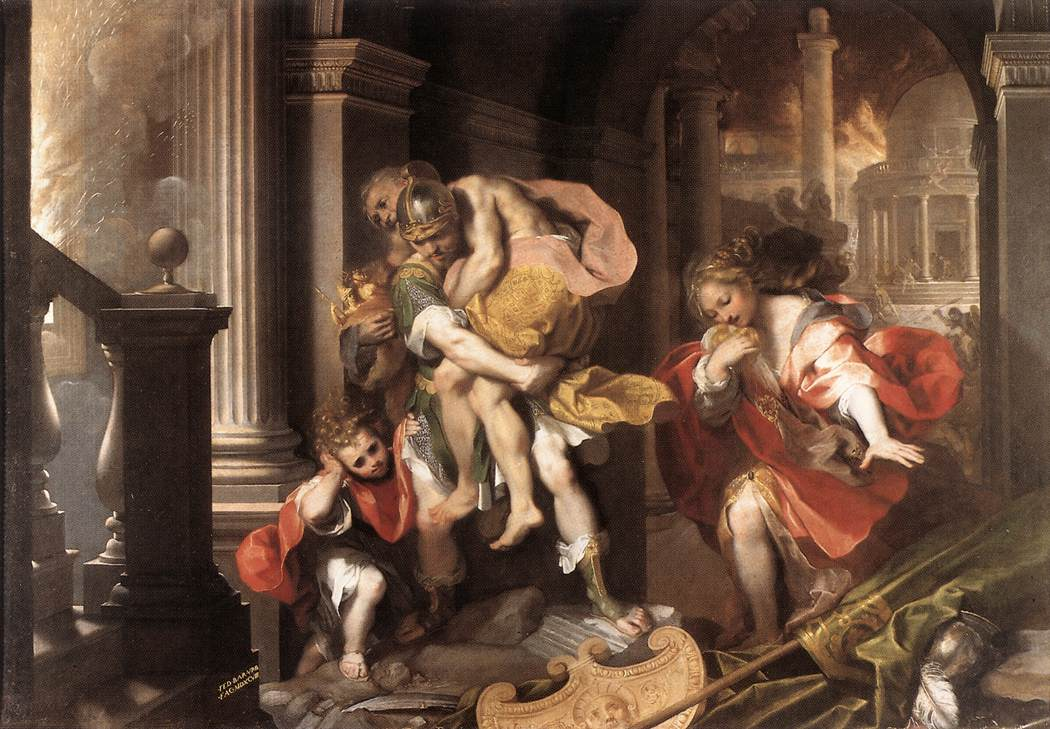
Aeneas Flees Burning Troy, by Federico Barocci (1598). Galleria Borghese, Rome, Italy

Map of Aeneas' legendary journey

The Aeneid (/ɪ.ˈniː.ɪd/, ih-NEE-id; Latin: Aeneis [ae̯ˈneːɪs]) is a Latin epic poem that tells the legendary story of Aeneas, a Trojan who fled the fall of Troy and travelled to Italy, where he became the ancestor of the Romans. Written by the Roman poet Virgil between 29 and 19 BC, the Aeneid comprises 9,896 lines in dactylic hexameter. The first six of its twelve books tell the story of Aeneas' wanderings from Troy to Italy, and the latter six tell of the Trojans' ultimately victorious war upon the Latins, under whose name Aeneas and his Trojan followers are destined to be subsumed.

The hero Aeneas was already known to Graeco-Roman legend and myth, having been a character in the Iliad. Virgil took the disconnected tales of Aeneas' wanderings, his vague association with the foundation of Rome, and his description as a personage of no fixed characteristics other than a scrupulous pietas, and fashioned the Aeneid into a compelling founding myth or national epic that tied Rome to the legends of Troy, explained the Punic Wars, glorified traditional Roman virtues, and legitimised the Julio-Claudian dynasty as descendants of the founders, heroes, and gods of Rome and Troy.

The Aeneid is widely regarded as Virgil's masterpiece and one of the greatest works of Latin literature.

== Mythology and origins ==
Although the definitive story of Aeneas escaping the fallen Troy and finding a new home in Italy, thus eventually becoming the ancestor of the Romans, was codified by Virgil, the myth of Aeneas' post-Troy adventures predates him by centuries. As Greek settlements began to expand starting in the sixth century BC, Greek colonists would often try to connect their new homes, and the native people they found there, to their pre-existing mythology; the Odyssey containing Odysseus's travels in many far away lands already provided such a link. Aeneas' story reflects not just Roman, but rather a combination of various Greek, Etruscan, Latin and Roman elements. Troy provided for a very suitable narrative for the Greek colonists in Magna Graecia and Sicily who wished to link their new homelands with themselves, and the Etruscans, who would have adopted the story of Aeneas in Italy first, and quickly became associated with him.

Greek vases as early as the sixth century BC provide evidence for these early Greek mythological accounts of Aeneas founding a new home in Etruria predating Virgil by a wide margin, and he was known to have been worshipped in Lavinium, the city he founded. The discovery of thirteen large altars in Lavinium indicates early Greek influence, dating to the sixth through fourth century BC. In the following centuries, the Romans would come in contact with Greek colonies, conquer them and subsume the legend of Aeneas into their own mythological narratives. It is most likely that they fully became interested in Greek myths—and their incorporation into their own foundation legends concerning Rome and the Roman people—following the war against King Pyrrhus of Epirus in 280 BC, as Troy offered a way to insert Rome into Greek historical tradition as good as the one it had in the past for Greeks to link themselves to their new lands.

Literary evidence of a pre-Virgil attestation of Aeneas' journey can also be found. A fragment usually attributed to the fifth-century BC logographer Hellanicus of Lesbos' lost History of the Priestesses of Argos states that Rome was founded by Aeneas with the help of Odysseus and named after Rhome, a Trojan woman Aeneas was acquainted with. The attribution of this passage to Hellanicus has been met with some doubt and rejection, but other scholars are less dismissive. Around the fourth century BC, an otherwise unknown Alcimus apparently made Aeneas the father of Romulus by Tyrrhenia. Romulus' then grandson Rhomus (Remus) went on to found Rome.

== Story ==
The Aeneid can be divided into halves based on the disparate subject matter of Books 1–6 (Aeneas' journey to Latium in Italy), commonly associated with Homer's Odyssey, and Books 7–12 (the war in Latium), mirroring the Iliad. These two halves are commonly regarded as reflecting Virgil's ambition to rival Homer by treating both the Odyssey's wandering theme and the Iliad's warfare themes. This is, however, a rough correspondence.

=== Journey to Italy (books 1–6) ===
==== Theme ====
Virgil begins his poem with a statement of his theme (Arma virumque cano ..., "Of arms and the man I sing ...") and an invocation to the Muse, falling some seven lines after the poem's inception (Musa, mihi causas memora ..., "O Muse, recount to me the causes ..."). He then explains the reason for the principal conflict in the story: the resentment held by the goddess Juno against the Trojan people. This is consistent with her role throughout the Homeric epics.

==== Book 1: Storm and refuge ====
In the manner of Homeric epic, the story begins in medias res (into the middle of things), with the Trojan fleet in the eastern Mediterranean, heading in the direction of Italy. The fleet, led by Aeneas, is on a voyage to find a second home. It has been foretold that in Italy he will give rise to a race both noble and courageous, a race which will become known to all nations. Juno is wrathful, because she had not been chosen in the judgement of Paris, and because her favourite city, Carthage, will be destroyed by Aeneas' descendants. Also, Ganymede, a Trojan prince, was chosen to be the cupbearer to her husband, Jupiter—replacing Juno's daughter, Hebe. Juno proceeds to Aeolus, King of the Winds, and asks that he release the winds to stir up a storm in exchange for a bribe (Deiopea, the loveliest of all her sea nymphs, as a wife). Aeolus agrees to carry out Juno's orders (line 77, "My task is / To fulfill your commands"); the storm then devastates the fleet.

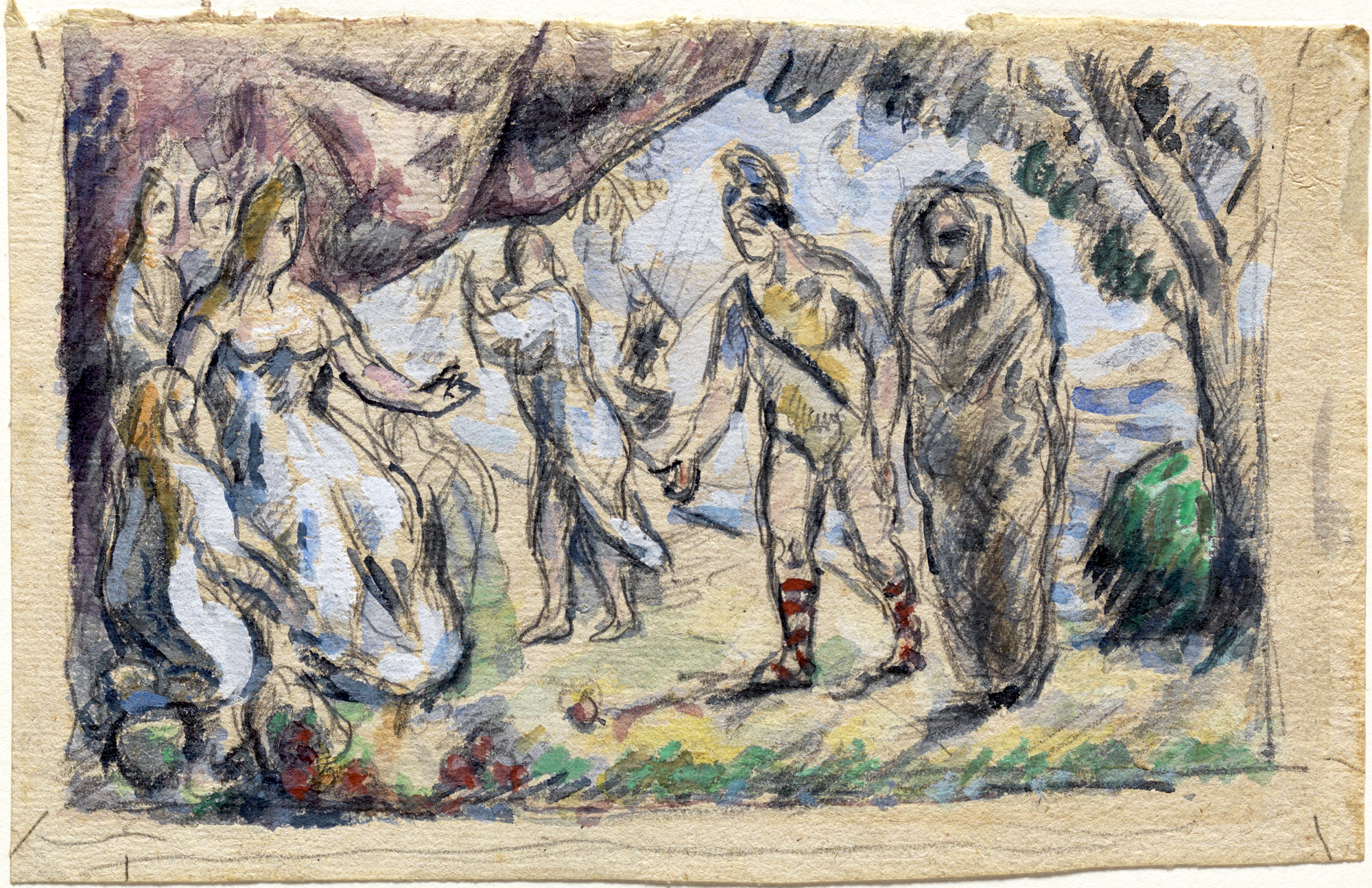
Paul Cézanne, Aeneas Meeting Dido at Carthage, c. 1875, Princeton University Art Museum

Neptune takes notice: although he himself is no friend of the Trojans, he is infuriated by Juno's intrusion into his domain, and stills the winds and calms the waters, after making sure that the winds would not bother the Trojans again, lest they be punished more harshly than they were this time. The fleet takes shelter on the coast of Africa, where Aeneas rouses the spirits of his men, reassuring them that they have been through worse situations before. There, Aeneas' mother, Venus, in the form of a huntress very similar to the goddess Diana, encourages him and recounts to him the history of Carthage. Eventually, Aeneas ventures into the city, and in the temple of Juno he seeks and gains the favour of Dido, queen of the city. The city has only recently been founded by refugees from Tyre and will later become a great imperial rival and enemy to Rome.

Meanwhile, Venus has her own plans. She goes to her son, Aeneas' half-brother Cupid, and tells him to imitate Ascanius (the son of Aeneas and his first wife Creusa). Thus disguised, Cupid goes to Dido and offers the gifts expected from a guest. As Dido cradles the boy during a banquet given in honour of the Trojans, Cupid secretly weakens her sworn fidelity to the soul of her late husband Sychaeus, who was murdered by her brother Pygmalion back in Tyre, by inciting fresh love for Aeneas.

==== Book 2: Trojan Horse and sack of Troy ====
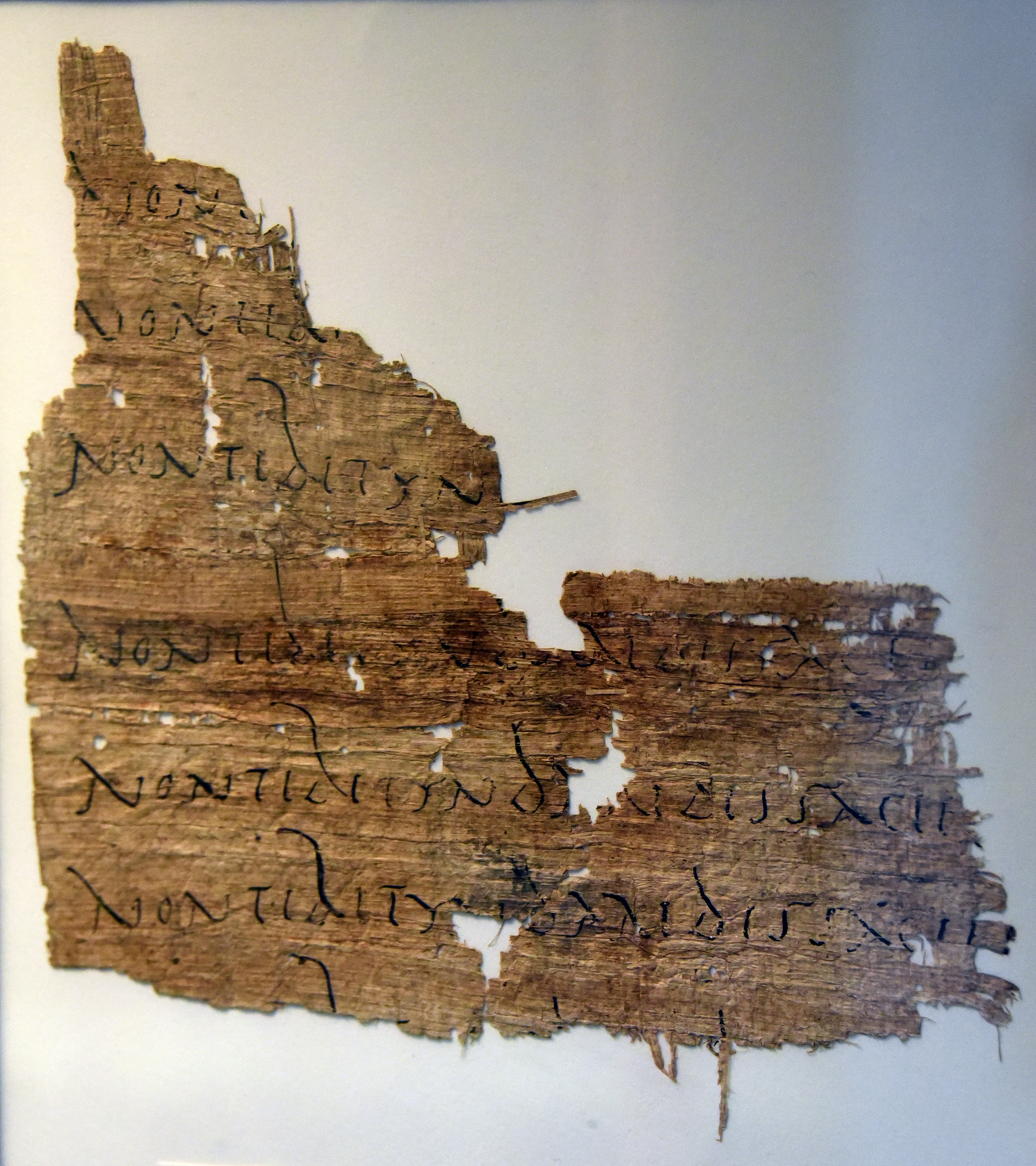
Hawara Papyrus 24, with a line of the Aeneid (repeated 7 times, probably a writing exercise) that translates: "It is not the hated face of Spartan Helen..."). 1st century AD, from Hawara, Egypt; displayed at the British Museum, London

In books 2 and 3, Aeneas recounts to Dido the events that occasioned the Trojans' arrival. Cunning Ulysses devised a way for Greek warriors to gain entry into the walled city of Troy by hiding in a large wooden horse. The Greeks pretended to sail away, leaving a warrior, Sinon, to mislead the Trojans into believing that the horse was an offering and that if it were taken into the city, the Trojans would be able to conquer Greece. The Trojan priest Laocoön saw through the Greek plot and urged the horse's destruction, but his protests fell on deaf ears, so he hurled his spear at the horse. Then, in what would be seen by the Trojans as punishment from the gods, two serpents emerged from the sea and devoured Laocoön, along with his two sons. The Trojans then took the horse inside the fortified walls, and after nightfall the armed Greeks emerged from it, opening the city's gates to allow the returned Greek army to slaughter the Trojans.

In a dream, Hector, the fallen Trojan prince, advised Aeneas to flee with his family. Aeneas awoke and saw with horror what was happening to his beloved city. At first he tried to fight the enemy, but soon he lost his comrades and was left alone to fend off the Greeks. He witnessed the murder of Priam by Achilles' son Pyrrhus. His mother, Venus, interrupted him when he was about to murder Helen, and led him back to his house. Aeneas tells of his escape with his son, Ascanius, his wife Creusa, and his father, Anchises, after the occurrence of various omens (Ascanius' head catching fire without his being harmed, a clap of thunder and a shooting star). At the city gates, they notice that they have lost Creusa, and Aeneas has to re-enter the city in order to look for her. To his sorrow, he encounters only her ghost, who tells him that his destiny is to reach Hesperia, where kingship and a royal spouse await him.

==== Book 3: Wanderings ====
Aeneas continues his account to Dido by telling how, rallying the other survivors, he built a fleet of ships and made landfall at various locations in the Mediterranean: Thrace, where they find the last remains of a fellow Trojan, Polydorus; Delos, where Apollo tells them to leave and to find the land of their forefathers; Crete, which they believe to be that land, and where they build their city (Pergamea) and promptly desert it after a plague proves this is not the place for them; the Strophades, where they encounter the Harpy Celaeno, who tells them to leave her island and to look for Italy, though, she prophesies, they will not find it until hunger forces them to eat their tables; and Buthrotum. This last city had been built in an attempt to replicate Troy. In Buthrotum, Aeneas meets Andromache, the widow of Hector. She is still lamenting the loss of her valiant husband and beloved child. There, too, Aeneas sees and meets Helenus, one of Priam's sons, who has the gift of prophecy. Through him, Aeneas learns the destiny laid out for him: he is divinely advised to seek out the land of Italy (also known as Ausonia or Hesperia), where his descendants will not only prosper, but in time rule the entire known world. In addition, Helenus also bids him to go to the Sibyl in Cumae.

Heading into the open sea, Aeneas leaves Buthrotum, rounds the south eastern tip of Italy and makes his way towards Sicily (Trinacria). There, they are caught in the whirlpool of Charybdis and driven out to sea. Soon they come ashore at the land of the Cyclopes. There they meet a Greek, Achaemenides, one of Ulysses' men, who has been left behind when his comrades escaped the cave of Polyphemus. They take Achaemenides on board and narrowly escape Polyphemus. Shortly after, at Drepanum, Aeneas' father Anchises dies of old age. Aeneas heads on (towards Italy) and gets deflected to Carthage (by the storm described in book 1). Here, Aeneas ends his account of his wanderings to Dido.

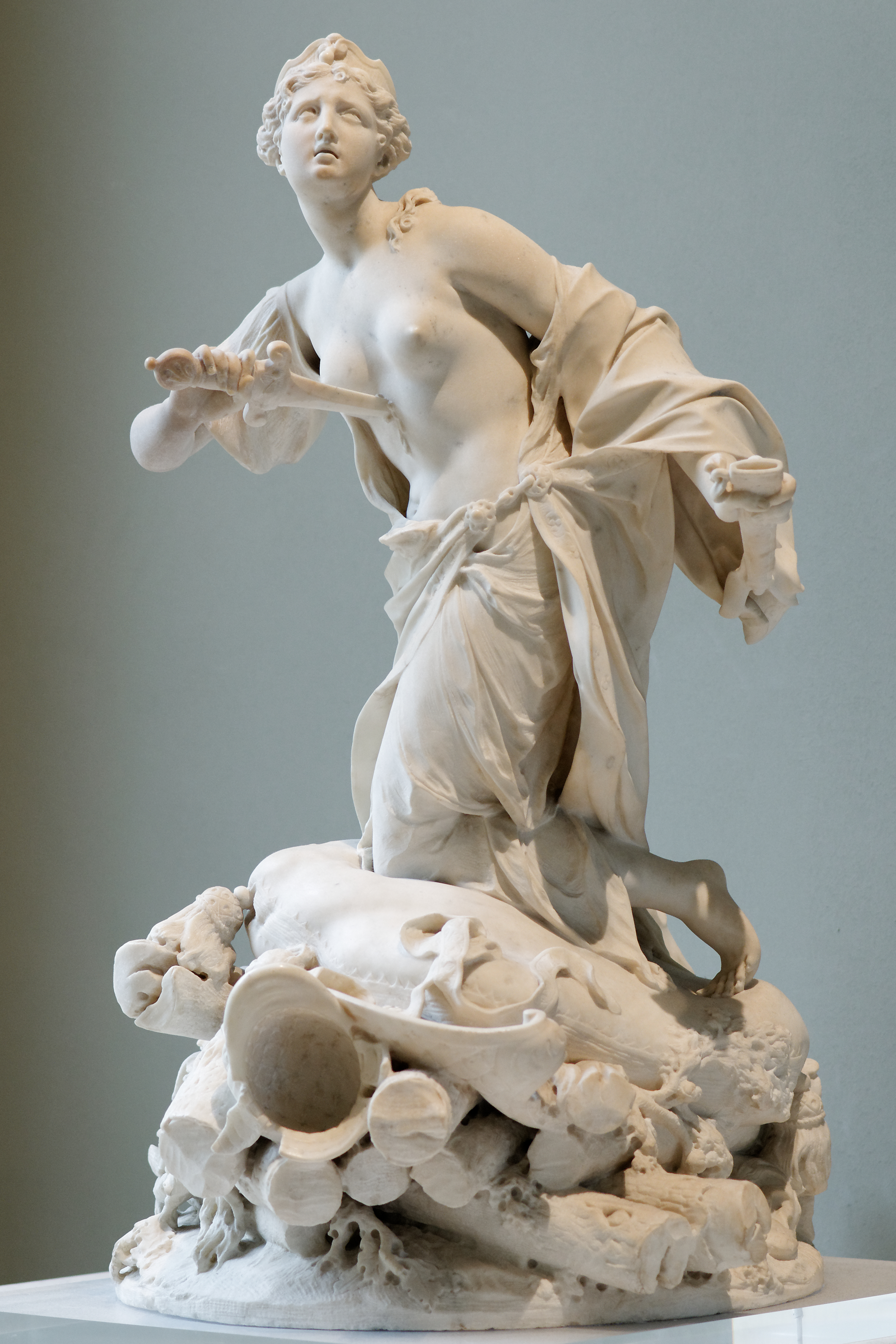
The suicide of Queen Dido (book 4), sculpture by Claude-Augustin Cayot (1667–1722)

==== Book 4: Fate of Queen Dido ====
Dido realises that she has fallen in love with Aeneas. Juno seizes upon this opportunity to make a deal with Venus, Aeneas' mother, with the intention of distracting Aeneas from his destiny of founding a city in Italy. Aeneas is inclined to return Dido's love, and during a hunting expedition, a storm created by Juno drives them into a cave, where Juno presides over a ceremony in which natural phenomena imitate the symbols of a marriage ceremony. Dido interprets this as a marriage.

Fama (the personification of rumour) spreads the news of Aeneas and Dido's marriage, which eventually reaches King Iarbas. Iarbas, who also sought relations with Dido but was rejected, angrily prays to his father Jupiter to express his feeling that his worship of Jupiter has not earned him the rewards he deserves. As a result, Jupiter sends Mercury to remind Aeneas of his duty, leaving him no choice but to depart.

When Aeneas clandestinely begins making preparations to leave at the behest of Mercury, Dido discovers Aeneas' intentions. Enraged and heartbroken, she accuses Aeneas of infidelity while also imploring him to stay. Aeneas responds by attempting to explain that his duty is important and that he does not leave of his own volition, but Dido is not satisfied. Ultimately, her heart broken, Dido commits suicide by stabbing herself upon a pyre with Aeneas' sword. Before dying, she predicts eternal strife between Aeneas' people and hers; "rise up from my bones, avenging spirit" (4.625, trans. Fitzgerald) is a possible invocation to Hannibal.

==== Book 5: Sicily ====
Looking back from the deck of his ship, Aeneas sees the smoke of Dido's funeral pyre, and although he does not understand the exact reason behind it, he understands it as a bad omen, considering the angry madness of her love.

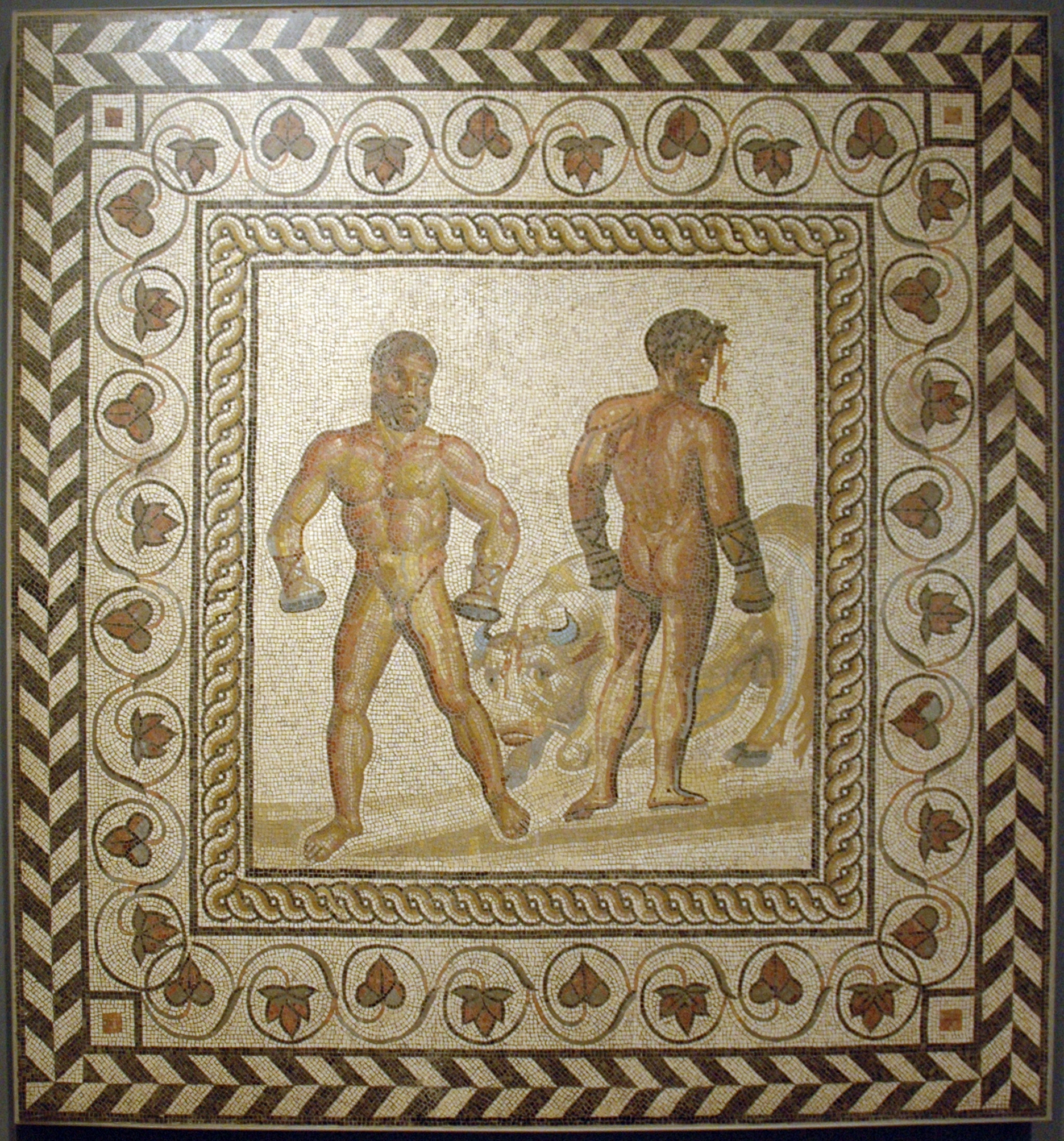
Boxing scene from the Aeneid (book 5), mosaic floor from a Gallo-Roman villa in Villelaure (France), c. 175 AD, Getty Villa (71.AH.106)

Hindered by bad weather from reaching Italy, the Trojans return to where they started at the beginning of book 1. Book 5 then takes place on Sicily and centres on the funeral games that Aeneas organises for the anniversary of his father's death. Aeneas organises celebratory games for the men—a boat race, a foot race, a boxing match, and an archery contest. In all those contests, Aeneas is careful to reward winners and losers, showing his leadership qualities by not allowing antagonism even after foul play. Each of these contests comments on past events or prefigures future events: the boxing match, for instance, is "a preview of the final encounter of Aeneas and Turnus", and the dove, the target during the archery contest, is connected to the deaths of Polites and King Priam in Book 2 and that of Camilla in Book 11. Afterwards, Ascanius leads the boys in a military parade and mock battle, the Lusus Troiae—a tradition he will teach the Latins while building the walls of Alba Longa.

During these events, Juno, via her messenger Iris, who disguises herself as an old woman, incites the Trojan women to burn the fleet and prevent the Trojans from ever reaching Italy, but her plan is thwarted when Ascanius and Aeneas intervene. Aeneas prays to Jupiter to quench the fires, which the god does with a torrential rainstorm. An anxious Aeneas is comforted by a vision of his father, who tells him to go to the underworld to receive a vision of his and Rome's future. In return for safe passage to Italy, the gods, by order of Jupiter, will receive one of Aeneas' men as a sacrifice: Palinurus, who steers Aeneas' ship by night, is put to sleep by Somnus and falls overboard.

==== Book 6: Underworld ====
Aeneas, with the guidance of the Cumaean Sibyl, descends into the underworld. They pass by crowds of the dead by the banks of the river Acheron and are ferried across by Charon before passing by Cerberus, the three-headed guardian of the underworld. Then Aeneas is shown the fates of the wicked in Tartarus and is warned by the Sibyl to bow to the justice of the gods. He also meets the shade of Dido, who remains irreconcilable. He is then brought to green fields of Elysium. There he speaks with the spirit of his father and is offered a prophetic vision of the destiny of Rome.

=== War in Italy (books 7–12) ===
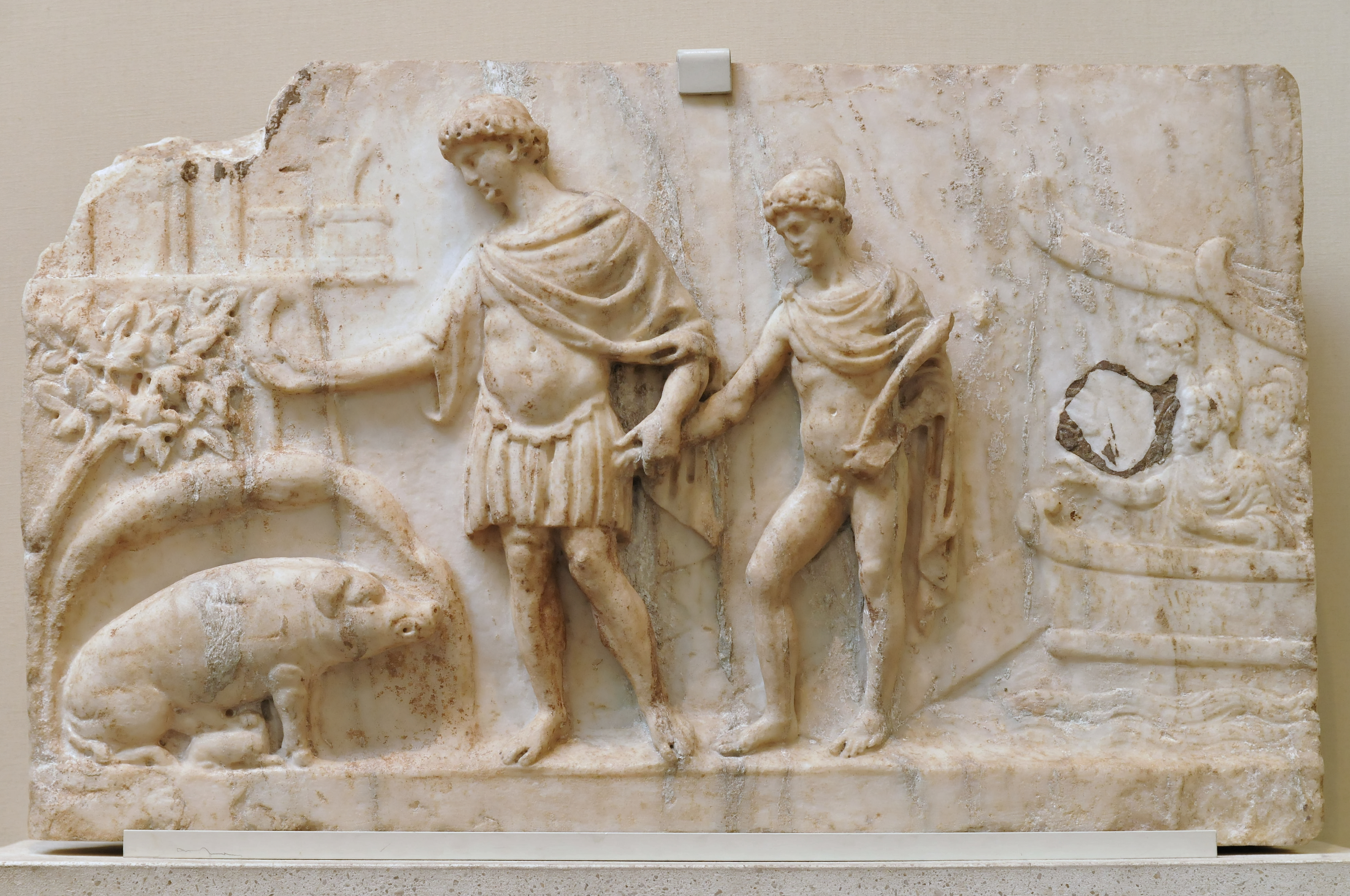
Roman bas-relief, 2nd century: Aeneas lands in Latium, leading Ascanius; the sow identifies the place to found his city (book 8).

==== Book 7: Arrival in Latium and outbreak of war ====
Upon returning to the land of the living, Aeneas leads the Trojans to settle in Latium, where King Latinus received oracles pointing towards the arrival of strangers and bidding him to marry his daughter Lavinia to the foreigners, and not to Turnus, the ruler of another native people, the Rutuli. Juno, unhappy with the Trojans' favourable situation, summons the fury Alecto from the underworld to stir up a war between the Trojans and the locals. Alecto incites Amata, the Queen of Latium and the wife of Latinus, to demand that Lavinia be married to noble Turnus, brings forth anger in Turnus which spurs him to war with the Trojans, and causes Ascanius to wound a revered deer during a hunt. Hence, although Aeneas wishes to avoid a war, hostilities break out. The book closes with a catalogue of Italic warriors.

==== Book 8: Visit to Pallanteum, site of future Rome ====
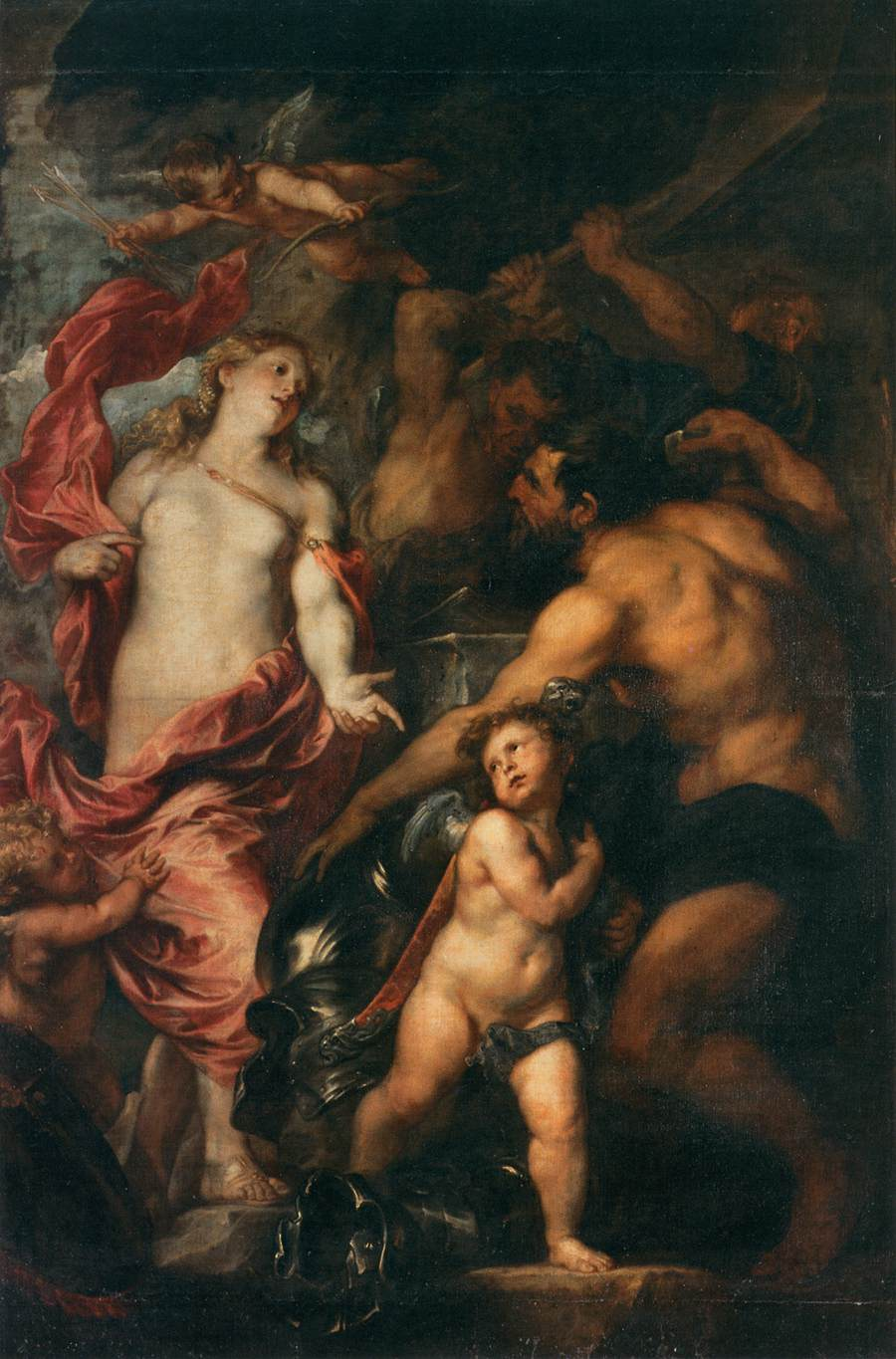
Venus Asks Vulcan to Forge Arms for her Son Aeneas by Anthony van Dyck, 1630–1632

Given the impending war, Aeneas seeks help from the Tuscans, enemies of the Rutuli, after having been encouraged to do so in a dream by Tiberinus. At the place where Rome will be, he meets a friendly Greek, King Evander of Arcadia. Evander sends his son Pallas to join Aeneas and lead troops against the Rutuli. Venus urges her spouse Vulcan to create weapons for Aeneas, which she then presents to Aeneas as a gift. On the shield, the future history of Rome is depicted.

==== Book 9: Turnus' siege of Trojan camp ====
Meanwhile, the Trojan camp is attacked by Turnus—spurred on by Juno, who informs him that Aeneas is away from his camp—and a midnight raid by the Trojans Nisus and Euryalus on Turnus' camp leads to their death. The next day, Turnus manages to breach the gates but is forced to retreat by jumping into the Tiber.

==== Book 10: First battle ====
A council of the gods is held, in which Venus and Juno speak before Jupiter, and Aeneas returns to the besieged Trojan camp accompanied by his new Arcadian and Tuscan allies. In the ensuing battle many are slain—notably Pallas, whom Evander has entrusted to Aeneas but who is killed by Turnus. Mezentius, Turnus' close associate, allows his son Lausus to be killed by Aeneas while he himself flees. He reproaches himself and faces Aeneas in single combat—an honourable but essentially futile endeavour leading to his death.

==== Book 11: Armistice and battle with Camilla ====
After a short break in which the funeral ceremony for Pallas takes place, the war continues. Another notable native, Camilla, an Amazon character and virgin devoted to Diana, fights bravely but is killed by Aruns, who in turn is struck dead by Diana's sentinel Opis.

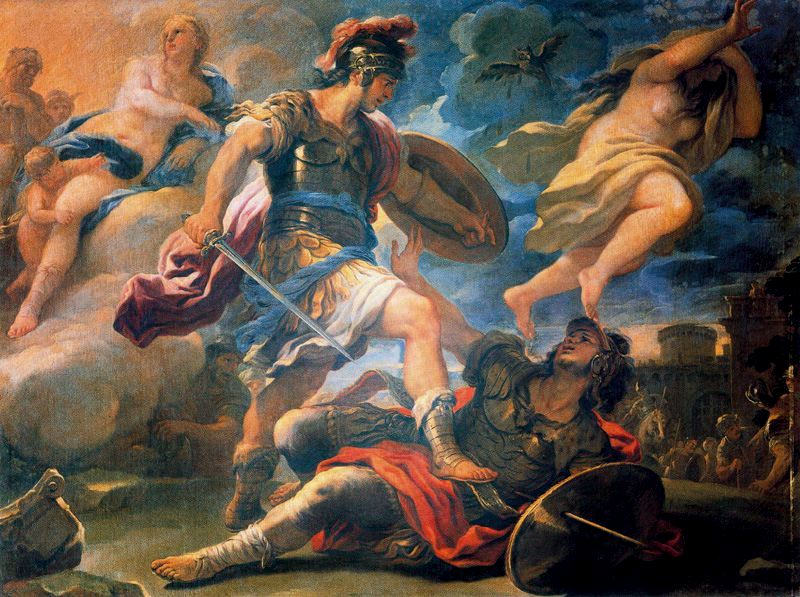
Aeneas' defeat of Turnus (book 12), painting by Luca Giordano

==== Book 12: Final battle and duel of Aeneas and Turnus ====
Single combat is proposed between Aeneas and Turnus, but Aeneas is so obviously superior to Turnus that the Rutuli, urged on by Turnus' divine sister, Juturna—who in turn is instigated by Juno—break the truce. Aeneas is injured by an arrow but is soon healed with the help of his mother Venus and returns to the battle. Turnus and Aeneas dominate the battle on opposite wings, but when Aeneas makes a daring attack at the city of Latium (causing the queen of Latium to hang herself in despair), he forces Turnus into single combat once more. In the duel, Turnus' strength deserts him as he tries to hurl a rock, and Aeneas' spear goes through his thigh. As Turnus is on his knees, begging for his life, the epic ends with Aeneas initially tempted to obey Turnus' pleas to spare his life, but then killing him in rage when he sees that Turnus is wearing Aeneas' friend Pallas' belt over his shoulder as a trophy.

== Reception ==
Critics of the Aeneid focus on a variety of issues. The tone of the poem as a whole is a particular matter of debate; some see the poem as ultimately pessimistic and politically subversive to the Augustan regime, while others view it as a celebration of the new imperial dynasty. Virgil makes use of the symbolism of the Augustan regime, and some scholars see strong associations between Augustus and Aeneas, the one as founder and the other as re-founder of Rome. A strong teleology, or drive towards a climax, has been detected in the poem. The Aeneid is full of prophecies about the future of Rome, the deeds of Augustus, his ancestors, and famous Romans, and the Carthaginian Wars; the shield of Aeneas even depicts Augustus' victory at Actium in 31 BC. A further focus of study is the character of Aeneas. As the protagonist of the poem, Aeneas seems to constantly waver between his emotions and commitment to his prophetic duty to found Rome; critics note the breakdown of Aeneas' emotional control in the last sections of the poem where the "pious" and "righteous" Aeneas mercilessly slaughters the Latin warrior Turnus.

The Aeneid appears to have been a great success. Virgil is said to have recited Books 2, 4 and 6 to Augustus; the mention of her son, Marcellus, in book 6 apparently caused Augustus' sister Octavia to faint. The poem was unfinished when Virgil died in 19 BC.

== Virgil's death, and editing ==
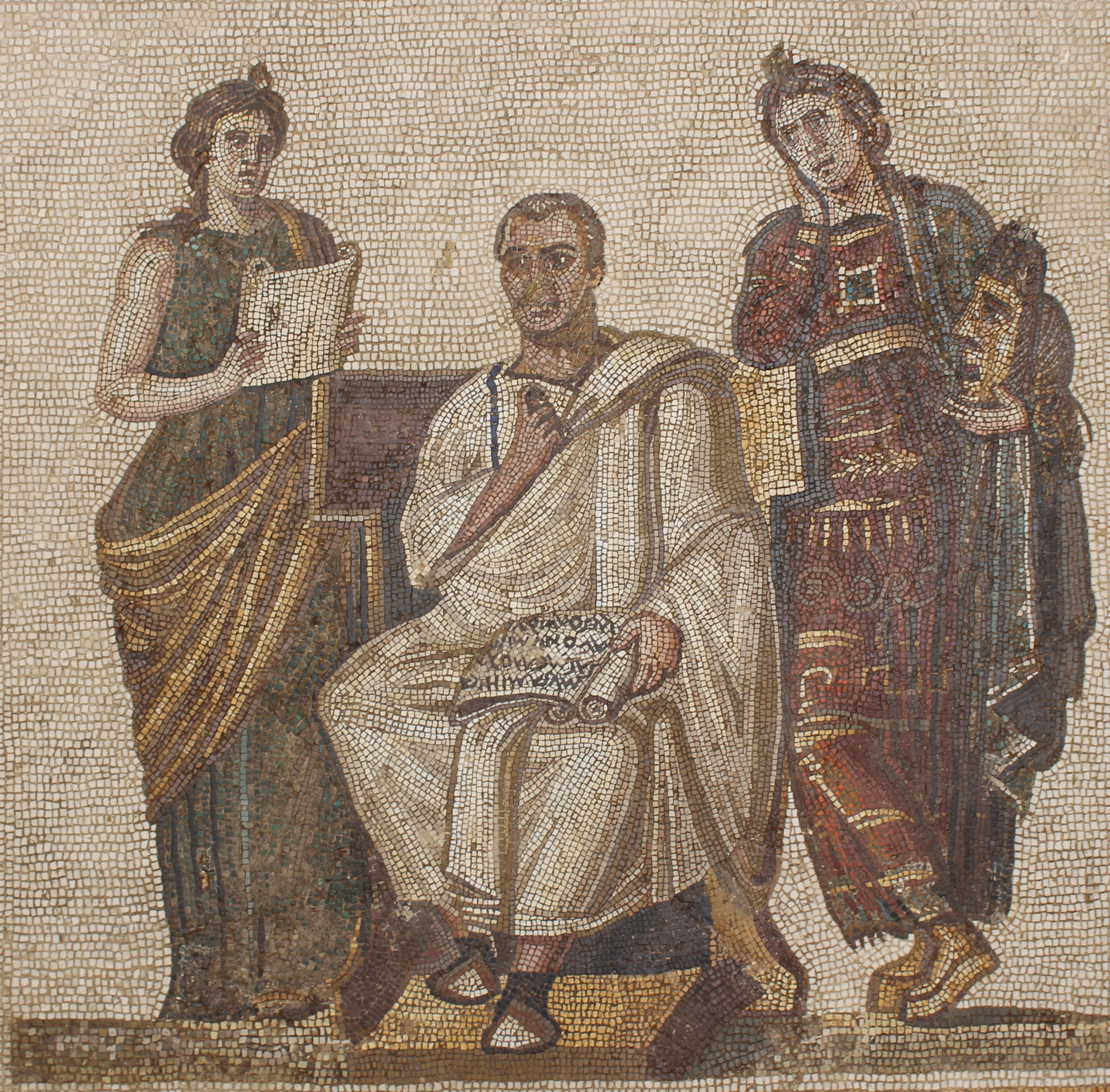
Virgil, holding a manuscript of the Aeneid, flanked by the muses Clio (history) and Melpomene (tragedy). Roman mosaic, third century AD, from Hadrumetum, now in the Bardo Museum, Tunis.

According to tradition, Virgil travelled to Greece around 19 BC to revise the Aeneid. After meeting Augustus in Athens and deciding to return home, Virgil caught a fever while visiting a town near Megara. Virgil crossed to Italy by ship, weakened with disease, and died in Brundisium harbour on 21 September 19 BC, leaving a wish that the manuscript of the Aeneid was to be burned. Augustus ordered Virgil's literary executors, Lucius Varius Rufus and Plotius Tucca, to disregard that wish, instead ordering the Aeneid to be published with as few editorial changes as possible.

== History ==
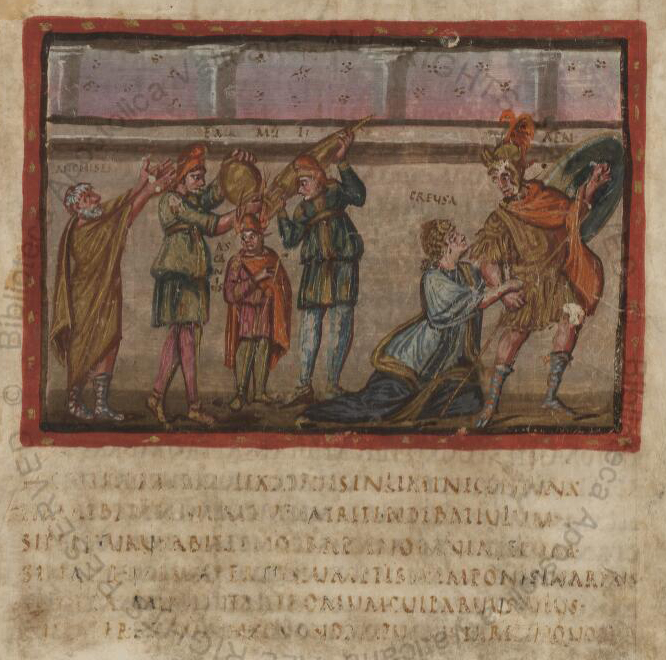
Folio 22 from the Vergilius Vaticanus—flight from Troy

The Aeneid was written in a time of major political and social change in Rome, with the fall of the Roman Republic and the War of Actium having torn through society and many Romans' faith in the "Greatness of Rome" severely faltering. However, the new emperor, Augustus Caesar, began to institute a new era of prosperity and peace, specifically through the re-introduction of traditional Roman moral values. The Aeneid was seen as reflecting this aim, by depicting the heroic Aeneas as a man devoted and loyal to his country and its prominence, rather than his own personal gains. In addition, the Aeneid gives mythic legitimisation to the rule of Julius Caesar and, by extension, to his adopted son Augustus, by immortalising the tradition that renamed Aeneas' son, Ascanius (called Ilus from Ilium, meaning Troy), Iulus, thus making him an ancestor of the gens Julia, the family of Julius Caesar, and many other great imperial descendants as part of the prophecy given to him in the Underworld. (The meter shows that the name "Iulus" is pronounced as three syllables, not as "Julus".)

The perceived deficiency of any account of Aeneas' marriage to Lavinia or his founding of the Roman race led some writers, such as the 15th-century Italian poet Maffeo Vegio (through his Thirteenth Book of the Aeneid widely printed in the Renaissance), Pier Candido Decembrio (whose attempt was never completed), Claudio Salvucci (in his 1994 epic poem The Laviniad), and Ursula K. Le Guin (in her 2008 novel Lavinia) to compose their own supplements.

Despite the polished and complex nature of the Aeneid (legend stating that Virgil wrote only three lines of the poem each day), the number of half-complete lines and the abrupt ending are generally seen as evidence that Virgil died before he could finish the work. Some legends state that Virgil, fearing that he would die before he had properly revised the poem, gave instructions to friends (including the current emperor, Augustus) that the Aeneid should be burned upon his death, owing to its unfinished state and because he had come to dislike one of the sequences in Book VIII, in which Venus and Vulcan had sex, for its nonconformity to Roman moral virtues. The friends did not comply with Virgil's wishes and Augustus himself ordered that they be disregarded. After minor modifications, the Aeneid was published. Because it was composed and preserved in writing rather than orally, the text exhibits less variation than other classical epics.

== Style ==
As with other classical Latin poetry, the meter is based on the length of syllables rather than the stress, though the interplay of meter and stress is also important. Virgil also incorporated such poetic devices as alliteration, onomatopoeia, synecdoche, assonance, and hyperbole. Furthermore, he uses personification, metaphor, and simile in his work, usually to add drama and tension to the scene. An example of a simile can be found in book II when Aeneas is compared to a shepherd who stood on the high top of a rock unaware of what is going on around him. It can be seen that just as the shepherd is a protector of his sheep, so too is Aeneas to his people.

As was the rule in classical antiquity, an author's style was seen as an expression of his personality and character. Virgil's Latin has been praised for its evenness, subtlety and dignity.

=== Structure ===
The Aeneid, like other classical epics, is written in dactylic hexameters: each line consists of six metrical feet made up of dactyls (one long syllable followed by two short syllables) and spondees (two long syllables). This epic consists of twelve books, and the narrative is broken up into three sections of four books each, respectively addressing Dido; the Trojans' arrival in Italy; and the war with the Latins. Each book has roughly 700–900 lines. The Aeneid comes to an abrupt ending, and scholars have speculated that Virgil died before he could finish the poem.

== Themes ==
=== Pietas ===
The Roman ideal of pietas ("piety, dutiful respect"), which can be loosely translated from the Latin as a selfless sense of duty toward one's filial, religious, and societal obligations, was a crux of ancient Roman morality. Throughout the Aeneid, Aeneas serves as the embodiment of pietas, with the phrase "pious Aeneas" occurring 20 times throughout the poem, thereby fulfilling his capacity as the father of the Roman people. For instance, in Book 2 Aeneas describes how he carried his father Anchises from the burning city of Troy: "No help / Or hope of help existed. / So I resigned myself, picked up my father, / And turned my face toward the mountain range." Furthermore, Aeneas ventures into the underworld, thereby fulfilling Anchises' wishes. His father's gratitude is presented in the text by the following lines: "Have you at last come, has that loyalty / Your father counted on conquered the journey?"

However, Aeneas' pietas extends beyond his devotion to his father: we also see several examples of his religious fervour. Aeneas is consistently subservient to the gods, even in actions opposed to his own desires, as he responds to one such divine command, "I sail to Italy not of my own free will."

In addition to his religious and familial pietas, Aeneas also displays fervent patriotism and devotion to his people, particularly in a military capacity. For instance, as he and his followers leave Troy, Aeneas swears that he will "take up / The combat once again. We shall not all / Die this day unavenged."

However, it would be inaccurate to characterise Aeneas as the ideal Roman hero. Virgil seeks to present the character as representative of a conflict between the Homeric ideal of a passionate, glory-seeking fighter, and a Roman hero who favours pietas. Though he does display pietas throughout the poem, at numerous points we also see Aeneas' pietas questioned. In Book 10, when he finds out about the death of his friend Pallas, Aeneas is distraught and proceeds to slaughter a vast number of Latin soldiers, displaying furor or violentia, which would not be an aspirational quality for Roman soldiers.

Furor, to the Romans, was the idea of being enraged to the point of being controlled by one's emotions, which was a very Homeric theme (as seen in the Iliad when Achilles slaughters many Trojans after Patroclus' death). This theme is a recurring one in the poem, and is presented as the counterpoint to pietas. Aeneas is not an ideal Roman citizen, as he has not yet overcome his passion and desire for glory. As R. A. Brooks puts it, "Aeneas never fully possessed either the light or the kingdom that is ordained for him." Indeed, the poem finishes on such a note that Aeneas cannot be considered a model protagonist. At the end of Book 12, Aeneas has defeated Turnus, Turnus is pleading for his life, and Aeneas is about to spare him. However, he sees Pallas' baldric (belt) and is overcome with anger, so "burning with rage, he buried his sword deep in Turnus's breast". This is the triumph of furor and proves that Aeneas as a Roman is not complete. Instead, Aeneas should be considered a prototype for the ideal citizen, one which Augustus completes.

=== Divine intervention ===
One of the most recurring themes in the Aeneid is that of divine intervention. Throughout the poem, the gods are constantly influencing the main characters and trying to change and impact the outcome, regardless of the fate that they all know will occur. For example, Juno comes down and acts as a phantom Aeneas to drive Turnus away from the real Aeneas and all of his rage from the death of Pallas. Even though Juno knows in the end that Aeneas will triumph over Turnus, she does all she can to delay and avoid this outcome.

Divine intervention occurs multiple times, in Book 4 especially. Aeneas falls in love with Dido, delaying his ultimate fate of travelling to Italy. However, it is actually the gods who inspired the love, as Juno plots:

Dido and the Trojan captain [will come]
To one same cavern. I shall be on hand,
And if I can be certain you are willing,
There I shall marry them and call her his.
A wedding, this will be.

Juno is speaking to Venus, making an agreement and influencing the lives and emotions of both Dido and Aeneas. Later in the same book, Jupiter steps in and restores what is the true fate and path for Aeneas, sending Mercury down to Aeneas' dreams, telling him that he must travel to Italy and leave his new-found lover. As Aeneas later pleads with Dido:

The gods' interpreter, sent by Jove himself –
I swear it by your head and mine – has brought
Commands down through the racing winds!...
I sail for Italy not of my own free will.

Several of the gods try to intervene against the powers of fate, even though they know what the eventual outcome will be. The interventions are really just distractions to continue the conflict and postpone the inevitable. If the gods represent humans, just as the human characters engage in conflicts and power struggles, so too do the gods.

=== Fate ===
Fate, described as a preordained destiny that men and gods have to follow, is a major theme in the Aeneid. One example is when Aeneas is reminded of his fate through Jupiter and Mercury while he is falling in love with Dido. Mercury urges, "Think of your expectations of your heir, / Iulus, to whom the whole Italian realm, the land / Of Rome, are due." Mercury is referring to Aeneas' preordained fate to found Rome, as well as Rome's preordained fate to rule the world:

He was to be ruler of Italy,
Potential empire, armorer of war;
To father men from Teucer's noble blood
And bring the whole world under law's dominion.

There is a marked difference between fate and divine intervention, as even though the gods might remind mortals of their eventual fate, the gods themselves are not in control of it. For example, the opening lines of the poem specify that Aeneas "came to Italy by destiny", but is also harassed by the separate force of "baleful Juno in her sleepless rage". Even though Juno might intervene, Aeneas' fate is set in stone and cannot be changed.

Later in Book 6, when Aeneas visits the underworld, his father Anchises introduces him to the larger fate of the Roman people, as contrasted against his own personal fate to found Rome:

So raptly, everywhere, father and son
Wandered the airy plain and viewed it all.
After Anchises had conducted him
To every region and had fired his love
Of glory in the years to come, he spoke
Of wars that he might fight, of Laurentines,
And of Latinus' city, then of how
He might avoid or bear each toil to come.

=== Violence and conflict ===
From the very beginning of the Aeneid, violence and conflict are used as a means of survival and conquest. Aeneas' voyage is caused by the Trojan War and the destruction of Troy. Aeneas describes to Dido in Book 2 the massive amount of destruction that occurs after the Greeks sneak into Troy. He recalls that he asks his men to "defend / A city lost in flames. Come, let us die, / We'll make a rush into the thick of it." This is one of the first demonstrations of the way in which violence begets violence: even though the Trojans know they have lost the battle, they continue to fight for their country.

This violence continues as Aeneas makes his journey. Dido kills herself in order to end and escape her worldly problem: being heartbroken over the departure of Aeneas and now left alone, surrounded by violent rulers who desire her and her throne. Queen Dido's suicide is a double edged sword. While releasing herself from the burden of her pain through violence, her last words implore her people to view Aeneas' people with hate for all eternity:

This is my last cry, as my last blood flows.
Then, O my Tyrians, besiege with hate
His progeny and all his race to come:
Make this your offering to my dust. No love,
No pact must be between our peoples.

Furthermore, her people, hearing of their queen's death, have only one avenue on which to direct the blame: the already-departed Trojans. Thus, Dido's request of her people and her people's only recourse for closure align in their mutual hate for Aeneas and his Trojans. In effect, Dido's violent suicide leads to the violent nature of the later relationship between Carthage and Rome.

Finally, when Aeneas arrives in Latium, conflict inevitably arises. Juno sends Alecto, one of the Furies, to cause Turnus to go against Aeneas. In the ensuing battles, Turnus kills Pallas, who is supposed to be under Aeneas' protection. This act of violence causes Aeneas to be consumed with fury. Although Turnus asks for mercy in their final encounter, when Aeneas sees that Turnus has taken Pallas' sword belt, Aeneas proclaims:

You in your plunder, torn from one of mine,
Shall I be robbed of you? This wound will come
From Pallas: Pallas makes this offering
And from your criminal blood exacts his due.

This final act of violence shows how Turnus' violence—the act of killing Pallas—inevitably leads to more violence and his own death.

It is possible that the recurring theme of violence in the Aeneid is a subtle commentary on the bloody violence contemporary readers would have just experienced during the Late Republican civil wars. The Aeneid potentially explores whether the violence of the civil wars was necessary to establish a lasting peace under Augustus, or whether it would just lead to more violence in the future.

=== Propaganda ===
Written during the reign of Augustus, the Aeneid presents the hero Aeneas as a strong and powerful leader. The favourable representation of Aeneas parallels Augustus in that it portrays his reign in a progressive and admirable light, and allows Augustus to be positively associated with the portrayal of Aeneas. Although Virgil's patron Maecenas was obviously not Augustus himself, he was still a high figure within Augustus' administration and could have personally benefitted from representing Aeneas in a positive light.

In the Aeneid, Aeneas is portrayed as the singular hope for the rebirth of the Trojan people. Charged with the preservation of his people by divine authority, Aeneas is symbolic of Augustus' own accomplishments in establishing order after the prolonged chaos of the Roman civil wars towards the end of the Roman Republic. Augustus as the light of saviour and the last hope of the Roman people is a parallel to Aeneas as the saviour of the Trojans. This parallel functions as propaganda in support of Augustus, as it depicts the Trojan people, future Romans themselves, as uniting behind a single leader who will lead them out of ruin:

New refugees in a great crowd: men and women
Gathered for exile, young-pitiful people
Coming from every quarter, minds made up,
With their belongings, for whatever lands
I'd lead them to by sea.

Later in Book 6, Aeneas travels to the underworld where he sees his father Anchises, who tells him of his own destiny as well as that of the Roman people. Anchises describes how Aeneas' descendant Romulus will found the great city of Rome, which will eventually be ruled by Caesar Augustus:

Turn your two eyes
This way and see this people, your own Romans.
Here is Caesar, and all the line of Iulus,
All who shall one day pass under the dome
Of the great sky: this is the man, this one,
Of whom so often you have heard the promise,
Caesar Augustus, son of the deified,
Who shall bring once again an Age of Gold
To Latium, to the land where Saturn reigned
In early times.

Virgil writes about the fated future of Lavinium, the city that Aeneas will found, which will in turn lead directly to the golden reign of Augustus. Virgil is using a form of literary propaganda to demonstrate the Augustan regime's destiny to bring glory and peace to Rome. Rather than use Aeneas indirectly as a positive parallel to Augustus as in other parts of the poem, Virgil outright praises the emperor in Book 6, referring to Augustus as a harbinger for the glory of Rome and new levels of prosperity.

== Allegory ==
The poem abounds with smaller and greater allegories. Two of the debated allegorical sections pertain to the exit from the underworld and to Pallas' belt.

There are two gates of Sleep, one said to be of horn, whereby the true shades pass with ease, the other all white ivory agleam without a flaw, and yet false dreams are sent through this one by the ghost to the upper world. Anchises now, his last instructions given, took son and Sibyl and let them go by the Ivory Gate.

— Book VI, lines 1211–1218, Fitzgerald trans. (emphasis added)

Aeneas' leaving the underworld through the gate of false dreams has been variously interpreted: one suggestion is that the passage simply refers to the time of day at which Aeneas returned to the world of the living; another is that it implies that all of Aeneas' actions in the remainder of the poem are somehow "false". In an extension of the latter interpretation, it has been suggested that Virgil is conveying that the history of the world since the foundation of Rome is but a lie. Other scholars claim that Virgil is establishing that the theological implications of the preceding scene (an apparent system of reincarnation) are not to be taken as literal.

The second section in question is

Then to his glance appeared the accurst swordbelt surmounting Turnus' shoulder, shining with its familiar studs—the strap Young Pallas wore when Turnus wounded him and left him dead upon the field; now Turnus bore that enemy token on his shoulder—enemy still. For when the sight came home to him, Aeneas raged at the relic of his anguish worn by this man as trophy. Blazing up and terrible in his anger, he called out: "You in your plunder, torn from one of mine, shall I be robbed of you? This wound will come from Pallas: Pallas makes this offering, and from your criminal blood exacts his due." He sank his blade in fury in Turnus' chest ...

— Book XII, lines 1281–1295, Fitzgerald trans. (emphasis added)

This section has been interpreted to mean that for the entire passage of the poem, Aeneas, who symbolises pietas (piety or morality), in a moment becomes furor (fury), thus destroying what is essentially the primary theme of the poem itself. Many have argued over these two sections. Some claim that Virgil meant to change them before he died, while others find that the location of the two passages, at the very end of the so-called Volume I (Books 1–6, the Odyssey), and Volume II (Books 7–12, the Iliad), and their short length, which contrasts with the lengthy nature of the poem, are evidence that Virgil placed them purposefully there.

== Influence ==
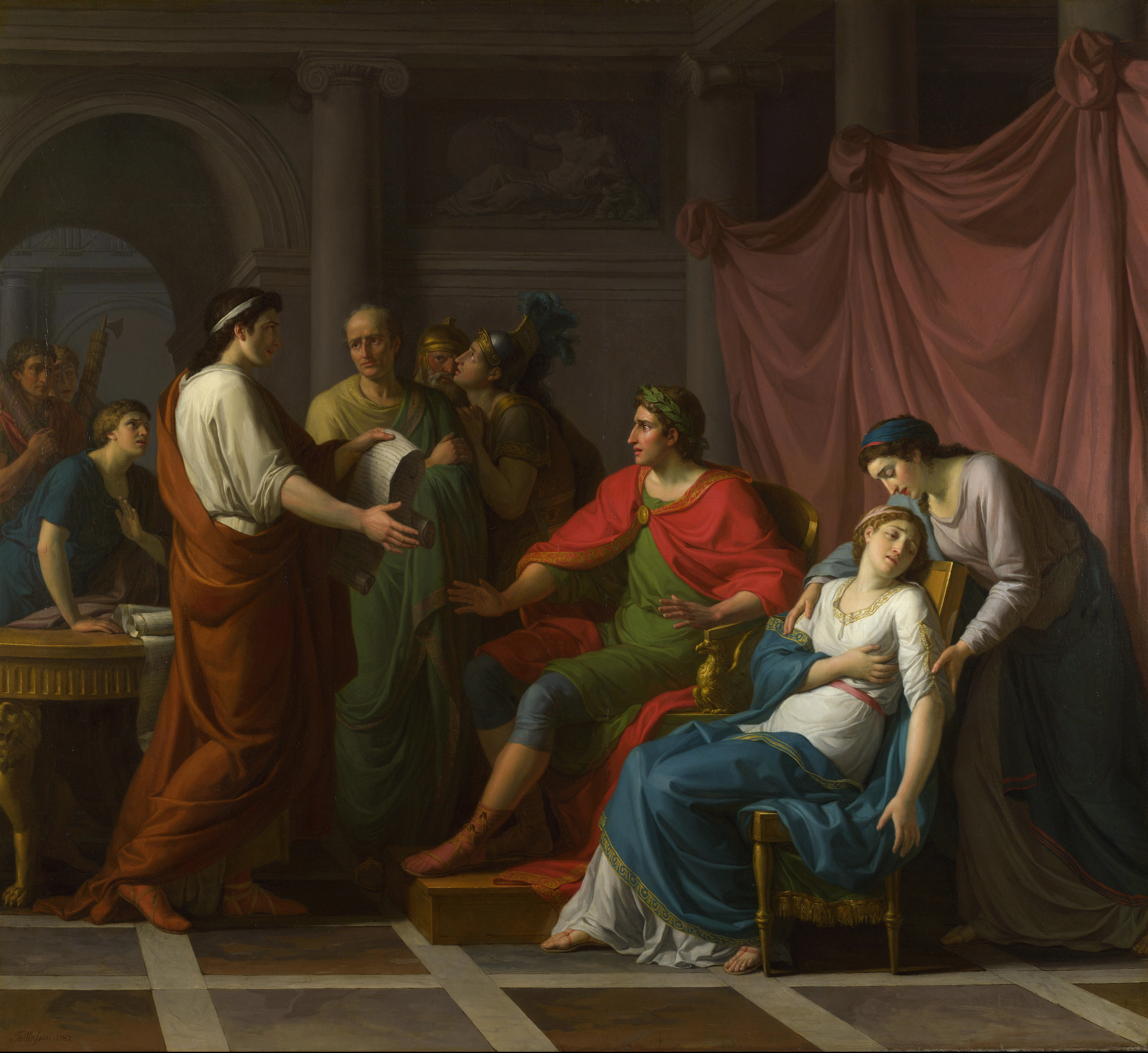
Virgil Reading the Aeneid to Augustus and Octavia, by Jean-Joseph Taillasson, 1787, an early neoclassical painting (National Gallery, London)

Dish with scene from the Aeneid (1536), Giulio da Urbino. The dish depicts Aeneas and his son Ascanius facing Dido.

The Aeneid is a cornerstone of the Western canon, and early (at least by the 2nd century AD) became one of the essential elements of a Latin education, usually required to be memorised. Even after the decline of the Roman Empire, it "remained central to a Latin education". In Latin-Christian culture, the Aeneid was one of the canonical texts, subjected to commentary as a philological and educational study, with the most complete commentary having been written by the 4th-century grammarian Maurus Servius Honoratus. It was widely held to be the pinnacle of Latin literature, much in the same way that the Iliad was seen to be supreme in Greek literature.

The strong influence of the Aeneid has been identified in the development of European vernacular literatures—some English works that show its influence being Beowulf, Layamon's Brut (through the source text Historia Regum Britanniae), The Faerie Queene, and John Milton's Paradise Lost. The Italian poet Dante Alighieri was himself profoundly influenced by the Aeneid, so much so that his magnum opus The Divine Comedy, itself widely considered central to the western canon, includes a number of quotations from and allusions to the Aeneid and features the author Virgil as a major character—the guide of Dante through the realms of the Inferno and Purgatorio. Another continental work displaying the influence of the Aeneid is the 16th-century Portuguese epic Os Lusíadas, written by Luís de Camões and dealing with Vasco da Gama's voyage to India.

The importance of Latin education itself was paramount in Western culture: "from 1600 to 1900, the Latin school was at the centre of European education, wherever it was found"; within that Latin school, Virgil was taught at the advanced level and, in 19th-century England, special editions of Virgil were awarded to students who distinguished themselves. In the United States, Virgil and specifically the Aeneid were taught in the fourth year of a Latin sequence, at least until the 1960s; the current (2011) Advanced Placement curriculum in Latin continues to assign a central position to the poem: "The AP Latin: Virgil Exam is designed to test the student's ability to read, translate, understand, analyze, and interpret the lines of the Aeneid that appear on the course syllabus in Latin."

Many phrases from this poem entered the Latin language, much as passages from William Shakespeare and Alexander Pope have entered the English language. One example is from Aeneas' reaction to a painting of the sack of Troy: Sunt lacrimae rerum et mentem mortalia tangunt—"These are the tears of things, and our mortality cuts to the heart" (Aeneid I, 462). The influence is also visible in very modern work: Brian Friel's Translations (a play written in the 1980s, set in 19th-century Ireland), makes references to the classics throughout and ends with a passage from the Aeneid:

Urbs antiqua fuit—there was an ancient city which, 'tis said, Juno loved above all the lands. And it was the goddess' aim and cherished hope that here should be the capital of all nations—should the fates perchance allow that. Yet in truth she discovered that a race was springing from Trojan blood to overthrow some day these Tyrian towers—a people late regem belloque superbum—kings of broad realms and proud in war who would come forth for Libya's downfall.

== English translations ==
The first full and faithful rendering of the poem in an Anglic language is the Scots translation by Gavin Douglas—his Eneados, completed in 1513, which also included Maffeo Vegio's supplement. Even in the 20th century, Ezra Pound considered this still to be the best Aeneid translation, praising the "richness and fervour" of its language and its hallmark fidelity to the original. The English translation by the 17th-century poet John Dryden is another important version. Most classic translations, including both Douglas and Dryden, employ a rhyme scheme; most more modern attempts do not.

Recent English verse translations include those by Patric Dickinson (1961); British Poet Laureate Cecil Day-Lewis (1963), who strove to render Virgil's original hexameter line; Allen Mandelbaum (honoured by a 1973 National Book Award); Library of Congress Poet Laureate Robert Fitzgerald (1981); David West (1990); Stanley Lombardo (2005); Robert Fagles (2006); Frederick Ahl (2007); Sarah Ruden (2008); Barry B. Powell (2015); David Ferry (2017); Len Krisak (2020); Shadi Bartsch (2021); as well as Scott McGill and Susannah Wright (2025).

There have also been partial translations, such as those by Henry Howard, Earl of Surrey (Book 2 and Book 4), and Seamus Heaney (Book 6).

== Adaptations ==
Lea Desandre performs the "Dido's Lament" aria from Purcell's Dido and Aeneas with Les Arts Florissants in 2020.

One of the first operas based on the story of the Aeneid was the English composer Henry Purcell's Dido and Aeneas (1688). The opera is famous for its aria "Dido's Lament" ('When I am laid in earth'), of which the first line of the melody is inscribed on the wall by the door of the Purcell Room, a concert hall in London.

The story of the Aeneid was made into the grand opera Les Troyens (1856–1858) by the French composer Hector Berlioz.

The Aeneid was the basis for the 1962 Italian film The Avenger and the 1971–1972 television serial Eneide.

In the musical Spring Awakening, based on the play of the same title by Frank Wedekind, schoolboys study the Latin text, and the first verse of Book 1 is incorporated into the number "All That's Known".

Ursula Le Guin's 2008 novel Lavinia is a free prose retelling of the last six books of the Aeneid narrated by and centred on Aeneas' Latin wife Lavinia, a minor character in the epic poem. It carries the action forward to the crowning of Aeneas' younger son Silvius as king of Latium.

A 17th-century popular broadside ballad also appears to recount events from books 1–4 of the Aeneid, focusing mostly on the relationship between Aeneas and Dido. The ballad, "The Wandering Prince of Troy", presents many similar elements as Virgil's epic, but alters Dido's final sentiments toward Aeneas, as well as presenting an interesting end for Aeneas himself.

=== Parodies and travesties ===
A number of parodies and travesties of the Aeneid have been made.

- One of the earliest was written in Italian by Giovanni Battista Lalli in 1635, titled L'Eneide travestita del Signor Gio.
- A French parody by Paul Scarron became famous in France in the mid-17th century, and spread rapidly through Europe, accompanying the growing French influence. Its influence was especially strong in Russia.
- Charles Cotton's 17th-century work Scarronides included a travestied Aeneid.
- In 1791 the Russian poet N. P. Osipov published Aeneid Turned Inside Out (Russian: Виргилиева Энеида, вывороченная наизнанку, lit. 'Vergil's Aeneid, turned inside out').
- In 1798 Eneida, a Ukrainian mock-heroic burlesque poem, was written by Ivan Kotliarevsky. It is considered to be the first literary work published wholly in the modern Ukrainian language. Kotliarevsky's epic poem was adapted into an animated feature film of the same name, in 1991, by Ukranimafilm.
- Some time between 1812 and the 1830s, the Belarusian poet Vikientsi Ravinski wrote the burlesque poem Eneida inside-out (Belarusian: Энеіда навыварат). His work was inspired by the Russian and Ukrainian parodies.

== See also ==
- Brutus of Troy
- Franciade
- Greek mythology
- Gulliver's Travels
- Hero's journey
- Les Troyens
- List of literary cycles
- Odyssey
- Papyrus Oxyrhynchus 31
- Prosody (Latin)
- Roman mythology
- Sinbad the Sailor
- The Voyage of Bran

== Bibliography ==
- Gagarin, Michael (2010). The Oxford Encyclopedia of Ancient Greece and Rome. Vol. 1. Oxford, New York: Oxford University Press. ISBN 978-0-19-517072-6.
- Farrell, Joseph; Putnam, Michael C. J. (28 January 2014). A Companion to Vergil's Aeneid and its Tradition. John Wiley & Sons. ISBN 978-1-4051-7577-7.
- Schultz, Celia E.; Ward, Allen M.; Heichelheim, F. M.; Yeo, C. A. (2019). A History of the Roman People (7th ed.). New York: Routledge. ISBN 978-1-138-70889-1.
- Solmsen, Friedrich (1986). ""Aeneas Founded Rome with Odysseus"". Harvard Studies in Classical Philology. 90. US: Harvard University Press: 93–110. doi:10.2307/311463. ISBN 0-674-37937-3. JSTOR 311463.
- Kinsey, Brian (2012). Heroes and Heroines of Greece and Rome. New York: Cavendish Square Publishing, LLC. ISBN 978-0-7614-7952-9.
- Momigliano, Arnaldo (1977). Essays in Ancient and Modern Historiography. Chicago: University of Chicago Press. ISBN 978-0-226-53385-8.
- Neel, Jaclyn (2017). Early Rome: Myth and Society. Hoboken: Wiley-Blackwell. ISBN 978-1119083795.
