= Rutuli =

Ancient people in Italy

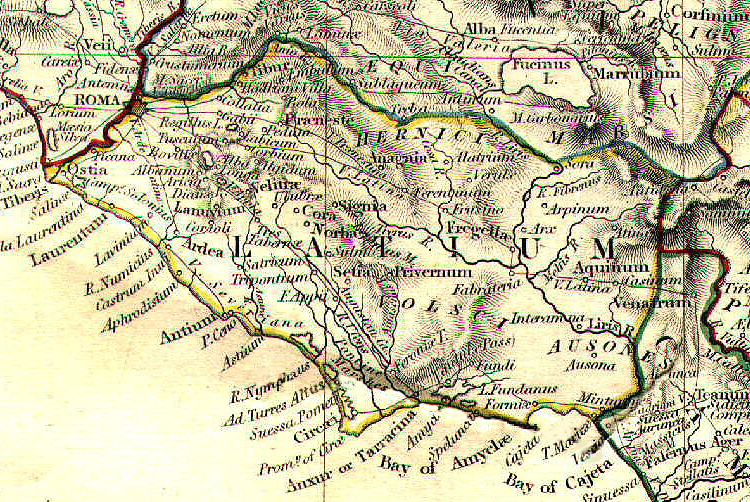
Map of Roman Latium

The Rutuli or Rutulians were an ancient people in Italy. The Rutuli were located in a territory whose capital was the ancient town of Ardea, located about 32 km (20 miles) southeast of Rome.

Thought to have been descended from the Umbri and the Pelasgians, according to modern scholars they were most likely connected with the Etruscan or Ligurian peoples.

== Mythological history ==
In Virgil's Aeneid, and also according to Livy, the Rutuli are led by Turnus, a young prince to whom Latinus, king of the Latins, had promised the hand of his daughter Lavinia in marriage. When the Trojans arrived in Italy, Latinus decided to give his daughter to Aeneas instead because of instructions he had received from the gods to marry his daughter to a foreigner. Turnus was outraged and led his people as well as several other Italian tribes against the Trojans in war. Virgil's text ends when Aeneas defeats Turnus in single combat and therefore confirms his right to marry Lavinia. In some other accounts of the story of Aeneas, Latinus is later killed in a subsequent battle with the Rutuli.

== War with Rome under Tarquinius Superbus ==
During the 6th century BC, in Rome's early semi-legendary history, Rome's seventh and final king Lucius Tarquinius Superbus went to war with the Rutuli. According to Livy, the Rutuli were, at that time, a very wealthy and powerful people. Tarquinius was desirous of obtaining the booty that would come with victory over the Rutuli.

Tarquin unsuccessfully sought to take Ardea by storm, and subsequently began an extensive siege of the city. The war was interrupted by the revolution that overthrew the Roman monarchy. The Roman army, camped outside Ardea, welcomed Lucius Junius Brutus as their new leader, and expelled the king's sons. It is unclear as to the eventual outcomes of the siege and the war.

== See also ==
- List of ancient peoples of Italy
- Prehistoric Italy
