= Turnus =

Mythical character King of the Rutuli

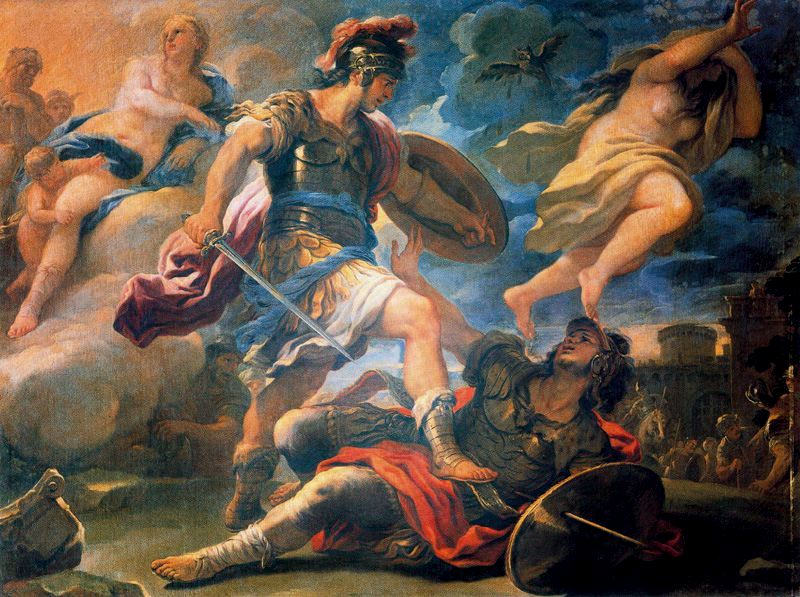
Aeneas defeats Turnus, Luca Giordano, 1634–1705. The female figure on the left is Venus, Aeneas' mother, who supported him during the battle. The female character on the right is Turnus' sister Juturna, who was forced by a Fury sent by Jupiter (depicted as a black bird) to abandon Turnus.

Turnus (Ancient Greek: Τυρρηνός, romanized: Tyrrhênós) was the legendary King of the Rutuli in Roman mythology, and the chief antagonist of the hero Aeneas in Virgil's Aeneid.

According to the Aeneid, Turnus is the son of Daunus and the nymph Venilia and is brother of the nymph Juturna.

== Historical tradition ==
While there is limited information in historical sources about Turnus, some key details about Turnus and the Rutuli differ significantly from the account in the Aeneid. The only source predating the Aeneid is Marcus Porcius Cato's Origines. Turnus is also mentioned by Livy in his Ab Urbe Condita and by Dionysius of Halicarnassus in his Ρωμαϊκή Αρχαιολογία (Rômaïkê Archaiologia, "Roman Antiquities"), both of which come later than the Aeneid.

In all of these historical sources, Turnus' heritage is unclear. Dionysius calls him Tyrrhenus, which means "Etruscan", while other sources suggest a Greek ancestry. In all of these sources, Turnus and his Rutulians are settled in Italy prior to the arrival of the Trojans and are involved in the clash between the Latins and the Trojans, but there is a great deal of discrepancy in details. It appears that Virgil drew on a variety of historical sources for the background of Turnus in the Aeneid.

== Virgil's Aeneid ==
Prior to Aeneas' arrival in Italy, Turnus is the primary potential suitor of Lavinia, the only daughter of Latinus, King of the Latin people. Upon Aeneas' arrival, however, Latinus promises Lavinia to the Trojan prince instead. Juno, determined to prolong the suffering of the Trojans, commands the fury Alecto to inflame Turnus with anger about this, prompting Turnus to demand a war with the new arrivals. King Latinus is greatly displeased with Turnus, but steps aside and allows the war to commence.

During the war between the Latins and the Trojans (along with several other Trojan allies, including King Evander's Arcadians), Turnus proves himself to be brave but hot-headed. In Book IX, he nearly takes the fortress of the Trojans after defeating many opponents, but soon is outnumbered. Juno saves him from death.

In Book X, Turnus slays Evander's son Pallas. As he gloats over the killing, he takes as a spoil of war Pallas' sword belt and puts it on. Virgil foreshadows that this spoil of war will mean the inevitable downfall of Turnus, saying 'the time will come for Turnus when he’d prefer to have bought an untouched Pallas at great price, and will hate those spoils and the day'. Enraged, Aeneas seeks out Turnus with full intent of killing him. To prevent his death at Aeneas's hands, Juno conjures a ghostly apparition of Aeneas, luring Turnus onto a ship and to a safety he did not choose himself. Turnus, in despair, questions his worth and even contemplates suicide.

In Book XII, Aeneas and Turnus duel to the death. Turnus strikes Aeneas with his sword, but it breaks: in his haste to get to battle, Turnus had grabbed his charioteer's sword, which proved too brittle for Aeneas's Vulcan-forged armor. Aeneas throws his spear, but misses, and it sticks in a sacred olive tree. Aeneas, in an Iliad-esque chase sequence (Aeneas pursues Turnus as Achilles chased Hector), runs after Turnus until with divine help Turnus gets his sword back (by way of his sister Juturna, who, aided by Juno, had disguised herself as his charioteer) and Aeneas his spear (helped by Venus). Turnus tries to lift a rock to throw at Aeneas but finds his strength failing. Aeneas then throws his spear, wounding Turnus in the thigh. Turnus begs Aeneas either to spare him or to give his body back to his people. Aeneas considers; but upon seeing Pallas's belt on Turnus, he is consumed by rage and kills Turnus. The last line of the poem describes Turnus' unhappy passage to the underworld.

Turnus' supporters include: his sister and minor river/fountain deity, Juturna; Latinus's wife, Amata; the deposed king of the Etruscans, Mezentius; and Queen Camilla of the Volsci, allies in Turnus' fight against Aeneas, the Trojans, and their allies.

== In later literature ==
The Historia Brittonum connected Turnus with the Turoni, and the city of Tours: "[Brutus of Troy] was exiled on account of the death of Turnus, slain by Aeneas. He then went among the Gauls and built a city of the Turones, called Turnis [Tours]". In the Middle English poem Sir Gawain and the Green Knight, the unknown poet cites as a parallel to Brutus of Troy's founding of Britain, that of an unidentified "Ticius" to Tuscany. Although some scholars have argued that "Titius" is derived from Titus Tatius, Otis Chapman has proposed that "Ticius" is a scribal error for what the poet intended to read as Turnus. On top of manuscript stylometric evidence, Chapman notes that in a passage in Ranulf Higdon's Polychronicon, Turnus is also named as King of Tuscany. This suggests that legends in the age after Virgil came to identify Turnus "as a legendary figure like Aeneas, Romulus, 'Langeberde', and Brutus". In Book IX of John Milton's Paradise Lost, the story of Turnus and Lavinia is mentioned in relation to God's anger at Adam and Eve.

Turnus is mentioned in the Pseudo-Jasher, a modern literary forgery, along with Angeas of Africa.

== Interpretation ==
Turnus can be seen as a "new Achilles", due to his Greek ancestry and his fierceness. According to Barry Powell, he may also represent Mark Antony or local peoples who must submit to Rome's empire. Powell adds that in the dispute between Turnus and Aeneas, Turnus may have the moral upper hand, having been arranged to marry Lavinia first. However, Turnus must be stopped since he is running counter to the force of destiny.
