= Latium Vetus =

Region of the Apennine Peninsula

Latium Vetus or Latium Antiquum (English: Old Latium) is a region of the Italian Peninsula bounded to the north by the Tiber River, to the east by the central Apennine Mountains, to the west by the Mediterranean Sea and to the south by Monte Circeo. It was the territory of the Latins, an Italic tribe which included the early inhabitants of the city of Rome. Later it was also settled by various Italic tribes such as the Rutulians, Volscians, Aequi, and Hernici. The region was referred to as "old" to distinguish it from the expanded region, Latium, that included the region to the south of Old Latium, between Monte Circeo and the river Garigliano – the so-called Latium adiectum ("attached Latium"). It corresponded to the central part of the modern administrative region of Lazio, Italy, and it covered an area measuring of roughly 50 Roman miles. It was calculated by Mommsen that the region's area was about 1860 square kilometres.

== Settlement ==
=== Literary tradition ===
Dionysius of Halicarnassus has preserved extensive information on the settlement of Latium in his book, Roman Antiquities, where he listed and discussed many legends and traditional stories related by historians and scholars, both Greek and Roman, on how Latium was settled. Pliny the Elder also wrote about Old Latium. In his book Natural History, he lists two settlements in Old Latium that at the time of writing had disappeared. Other important literary sources include Livy, Strabo, Festus, and Servius Danielis.

According to these sources Latium was first settled long ago by Sicels and Ligures, but many sources contradict or do not state which of the two groups first settled Latium. According to the literary tradition, the Sicels and Ligures were forced out of Latium by the constant pressure exerted by the Aborigines, who dwelt in Reate, causing the Ligures to migrate to Liguria and the Sicels to Sicily. The migration of the tribes appears to have been from the hills and mountains of the region down towards the plains, although there are testimonies of Greek colonizers migrating by sea into the region, as in the legend of Evander, and to southern Italy, as the Sicels were considered to be both Oenotrians of Greek origin, and Rutulian of Daunian origin.

The arrival of the Aeneads and the founding of Lavinium are claimed to mark the beginning of civilization in Latium, and 30 years after these events Alba was founded, the city that led the Latin League, a coalition of 30 cities and tribes that lasted for 500 years. While there are many different myths on the founding of these cities, it is known that the region and the Latin League were religiously influenced by the cult of Iuppiter Latiaris, an epithet of Jupiter, and venerated this god as the high protector of the league.

=== Pliny's list ===
The accounting provided by Pliny the Elder does not include all the centres of Latium Vetus that later developed into towns, but rather lists those which, according to the scholar, had disappeared by his time without leaving any trace. Therefore, he does not mention Anxur, Tibur, Cora, Ficulea, Nomentum, Praeneste, Gabii, Ardea, Aricia, Tusculum, Lavinium, Laurentum, Lanuvium, Labicum, and Velitrae, which were still standing, with the exception of old Labicum. But some settlements he mentions were in fact visited by Strabo only seventy years earlier (such as Tellenae), and some still certainly stood in his own time, such as Pedum. Another oddity of the passage is that while he claims there were fifty-three centres that had disappeared, his list numbers only fifty. Even though elsewhere he mentions two other sites, Apiolae and Amyclae, this still does not equal fifty-three. The list is in book III of his Natural History ch. 68 and 69:

In the first region moreover in Latium were the famous walled towns (clara oppida) Satricum, Scaptia, Politorium, Tellena, Tifata, Caenina, Ficana, Crustumeria, Ameriola, Medullum, Corniculum, Saturnia now which is Rome, Antipolis (which is now the Janiculum, a place in Rome), Antemnae, Camerium, Collatia, Amitinum, Norba, and Sulmo. Together with them the Alban Peoples who used to receive the (sacrificial) meat on the Alban Mount: Albani, Aesolani, Accienses, Abolani, Bubetani, Bolani, Cusuetani, Coriolani, Fidenates, Foreti, Hortenses, Latinienses, Longani, Manates, Macrales, Munienses, Numinienses, Olliculani, Octulani, Pedani, Poletaurini, Querquetulani, Sicani, Sisolenses, Tolerienses, Tutienses, Vimitellari, Velienses, Venetulani, Vitellienses.

The list is apparently made up of two sections, the first is referred to as clara oppida and the second as populi Albenses. The last two towns mentioned among the clara oppida, Norba and Sulmo, were in fact within Latium Adiectum. They were destroyed in the 1st century BC during the war between Marius and Sulla.

The second section gives the names of the populi Albenses. These were local communities inhabiting the region of Mons Albanus (now Monte Cavo) and its immediate surroundings, the Alban Hills. Only some of them seem to have reached the urban stage and the list reflects the typical archaic Bronze Age organization of human settlement: sparse, polycentric and gravitating around a religious centre, in this case the sanctuary of Iuppiter Latiaris. The exact location of these settlements is unknown with a few exceptions: Aesulae, Pedum, Fidenae, Politorium, Bovillae, and Tolerium. It is possible that the Latinienses were settlers of the Ager Latiniensis, i. e. the area near Laurentum and Lavinium, and that the Foreti were actually settlers of the area later occupied by the Roman Forum. The Querquetulani, however, were certainly not the settlers of the Querquetulan (i.e. Caelian ) Hill in Rome as they are mentioned by Dionysius in the list of Latin peoples who went to war against Rome in 495 BC.

=== Dionysius's list ===
Dionysius gives a list of the towns members of the Latin League that voted for war against Rome after the capture of Fidenae by the Romans, under the influence of Aricia and of former king Tarquinius the Proud at an assembly held at Ferentinum:

Ardea, Aricia, Bovillae, Bubentum, Cora, Carventum, Circei, Corioli, Corbio, Cabum, Fortinea, Gabii, Laurentum, Lanuvium, Lavinium, Labici, Nomentum, Norba, Praeneste, Pedum, Querquetula, Satricum, Scaptia, Setia, Tibur, Tusculum, Tolerium, Tellenae, Velitrae.

As Niebuhr remarked, once again the total yields the sacred number of thirty, but the sum is made up of different components. It is a mix of some of the members of the populi Albenses and some of the clara oppida. In fact, many of the oppida had been destroyed or resettled by the Romans during the regal period, namely Caenina, Politorium, Ficana, Cameria, Medullium, Corniculum, Collatia. Among the clara oppida of Pliny's list, Satricum, Norba, Sulmo, Scaptia, Tellenae show up here, and among the populi albenses Bubentum, Corioli, Pedum, Querquetula, Tolerium, and possibly Nomentum.

=== Other sources ===
In his description of Augustan region I, which included Old Latium, the geographer Strabo mentions many old towns, among them Collatia, Antemnae, Fidenae and Labicum, as reduced to mere villages, private rural estates or displaced to different locations; Apiolae, Suessa and Alba Longa as disappeared; Tellenae on the foothills southwest of the Alban Hills as still standing.

The historiographer Livy and the lexicographer Festus also repeatedly mention the old Latin towns. Another tradition related by Philistos of Syracuse calls the Sicels Ligurians, whose king was a Sikelos. This tradition is followed by Stephanus of Byzantium, who cites Hellanicus of Lesbos as his authority.

These ancient traditions have led some scholars to look for traces of the presence of these peoples in later populations.

== Archaeological evidence ==
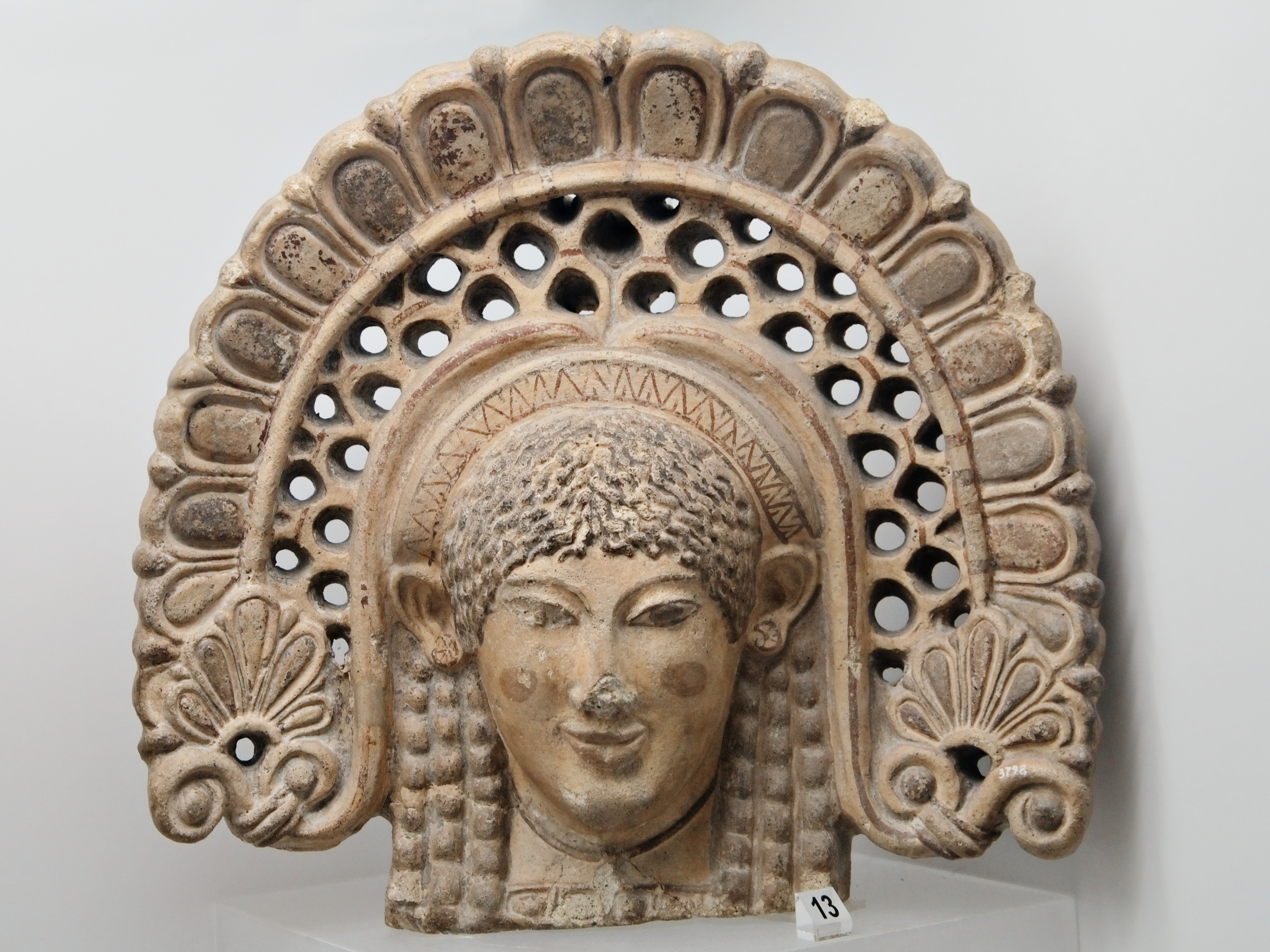
Polychrome antefix with female head with nimbus from Lanuvium, late-Archic temple of Juno Sospita, 500 BC, Villa Poniatowski, Rome

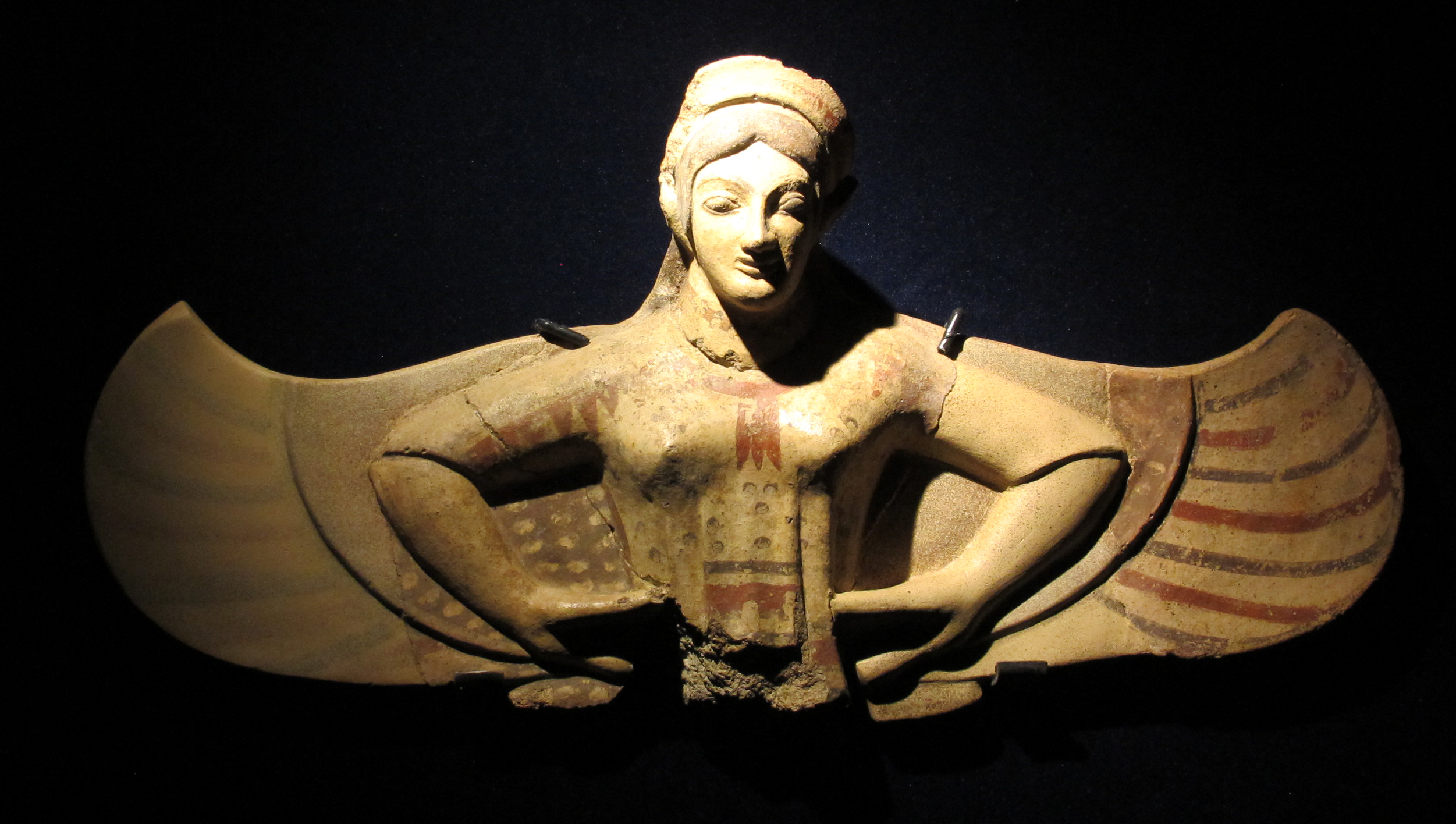
Acroterial statue of harpy-siren, beginning of the 5th century BC, from Gabii

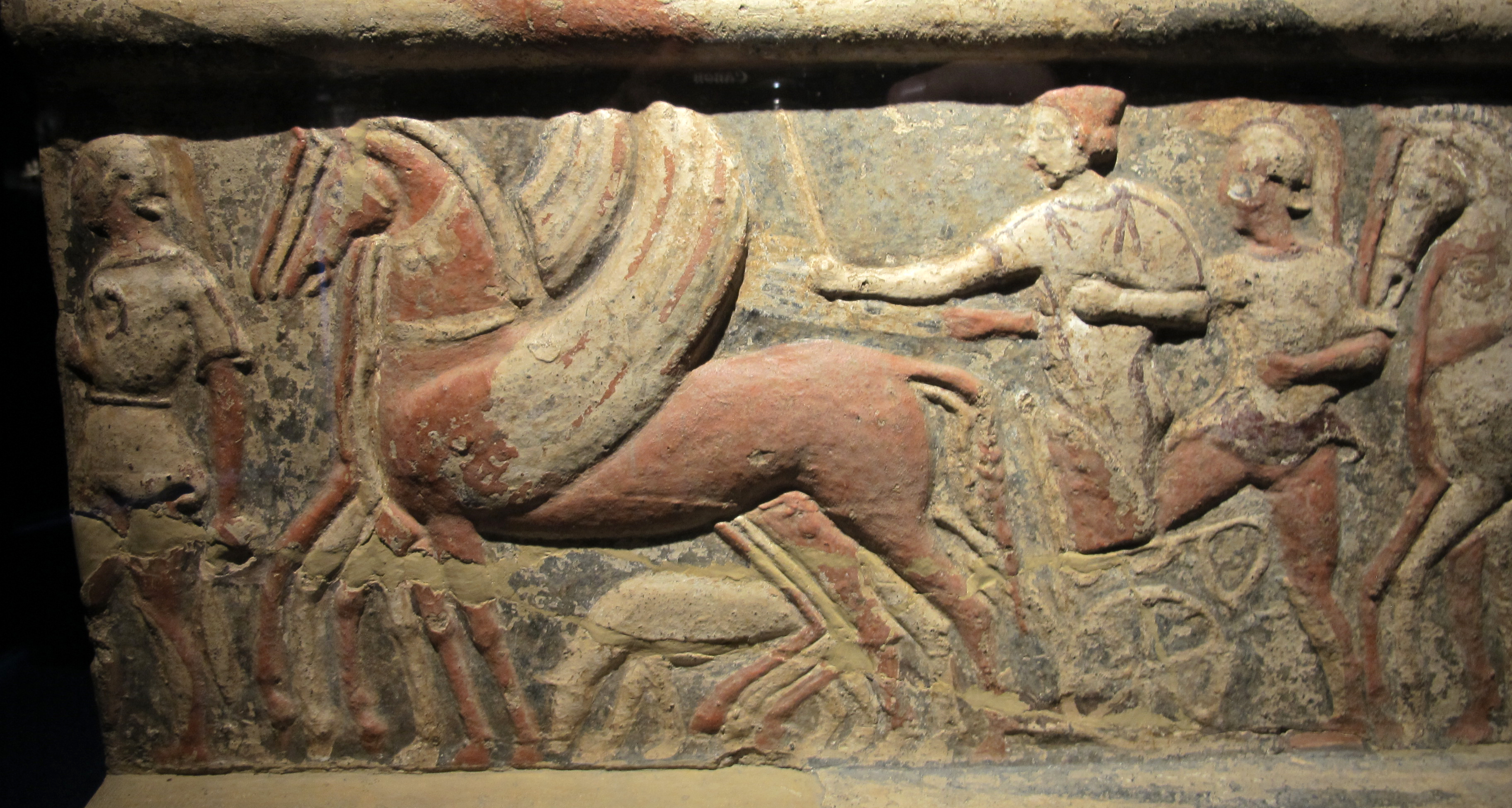
Frontonal sima with procession of floats and winged horses, 510–490 BC, from Praeneste

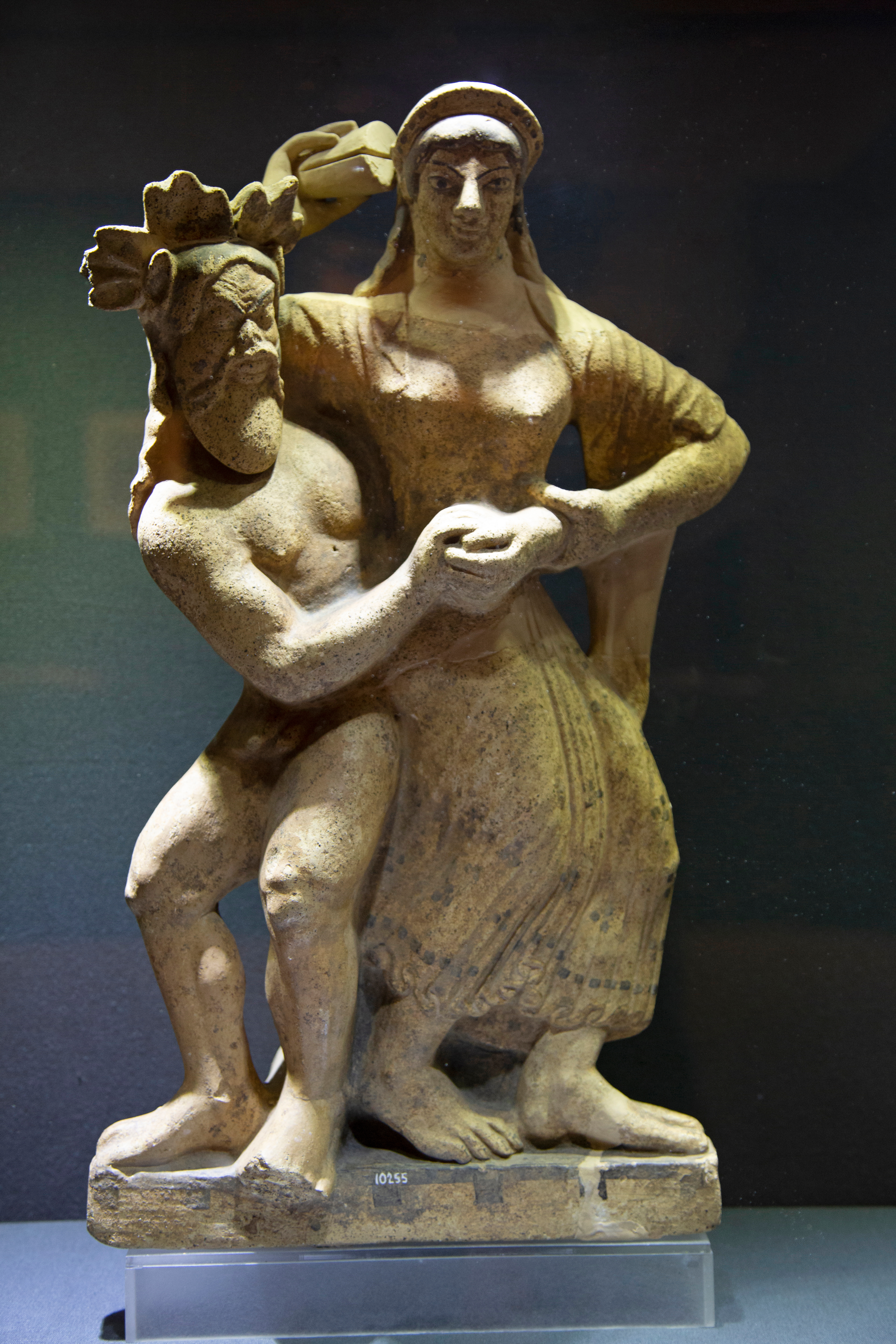
Antefix with Satyr and Maenad dancing from the acropolis, Temple of Mater Matuta, 490–470 BC, from Satricum

Even though erudite scholars have been trying to ascertain the location of the ancient towns of Latium for at least the last four centuries (see Cluvier), and despite the recent progress made by archaeology in the field of the human settlement of ancient Latium, only a few towns of archaic Latium cited by ancient sources have been identified with certainty, whereas a remarkable number of settlements that have been unearthed remain unidentified. This is due to the lack of epigraphic confirmation, due to the rare use of writing in archaic times. The problem is made even more difficult because some of the ancient locations were possibly resettled during the Early Middle Ages, as was probably the case for Labicum and Collatia. A good instance of such a custom is provided by Falerii outside Latium Vetus. Towns which have been identified archaeologically include Satricum, Politorium, Ficana, Tellenae, Crustumerium, Corniculum, Antemnae, Collatia, Fidenae, Pedum, Apiolae, Gabii and perhaps Querquetulum. Alba Longa, Pometia and Corioli remain unidentified. Traces of the presence of the Ligures and Sicels remain in the toponymy and onomastics.

The most conspicuous case and one which has given rise to long-standing debate is Alba Longa. The location of that famous city, according to tradition founded by Ascanius and the metropolis of the Latins for 418 years, is still a mystery. Some scholars have argued that it has not yet been identified because the Ancients themselves did not know exactly where it was located and the reason for their ignorance was that Alba had never been a real city. It would rather have been a loose collection of small and sparsely populated protohistoric villages organised in the Bronze Age custom around the sanctuary of Mount Albanus and abandoned before it reached the urban stage.

=== Amitinum ===
This centre was located to the east of Rome on the Corniculan Mountains, not far from Curniculum. Its identification is due to an inscription that mentions a pagus amentinus.

=== Antemnae ===
The town of Antemnae was located three miles to the north of Rome on the left bank of the river Anio and close to its confluence with the Tiber. Its name means "between the rivers" (Antemnae is the Sabine for Latin interamnes). Some of its ruins were discovered in 1880 during excavations to build the fortress "Forte Antenne". Later excavations yielded additional material. The location is now within the urban area of Rome.

Antemnae was colonised by Rome at the time of Romolus during the first effort to control the left bank of the Tiber up to the Anio, thus ensuring a communication route with Etruria along the Via Salaria. The Antemnates and the Caeninenses were granted full Roman citizenship. Nevertheless, the town revolted several times, the last time in 507 BC.

=== Apiolae ===
Destroyed by Tarquinius Priscus, the remains have been identified and excavated. The town was located on Monte Savello between Albano and Pavona. It housed a temple of Apollo and the famous spring of Juturna, with nearby Lake Turni being the object of a local cult. Today the two water sources are known as the spring of Secciano and the Laghetto di Pavona.

=== Aefulae ===
The site of the settlement of the Alban people Aesulani has been identified with the hilltop castrum of Aefulae near ancient Tibur and close to the site of one of the temples of Bona Dea. It was deserted by the original dwellers and later resettled by the Romans, who turned it into a military fort.

=== Bolae ===
The site of the Alban people Bolani is frequently mentioned by the historians Dionysius of Halicarnassus and Livy. It was occupied by the Aequians probably already in the late 6th century or in the wars led by Coriolanus. Its site is not known with certainty, but it must have stood not far from Praeneste and Labicum.

=== Corioli ===
The site of this settlement must have stood on the south-west side of the Alban Hills near Genzano and Lanuvium.

=== Pedum ===
The most important of the Latin towns developed from the ancient populi albenses, Pedum stood between Tibur and Praeneste near modern Gallicano nel Lazio. It was taken by the Romans with Coriolanus. After the final demise of the Latin League, the town declined.

=== Tolerium ===
This settlement of the Alban people was probably not far from Pedum, according to a passage in Dionysius of Halicarnassus (7.26).

=== Vitellia ===
The site of the populus of the Vitellienses was located at the border between the Latins and the Aequians.

=== Caenina ===
The site of Caenina has not yet been identified with certainty. It may have been located near present-day "La Rustica" close to the Anio river, on a trade route connecting Latium with Etruria and Campania. Festus states it was close to the old Roman settlement. It was originally a settlement of the Sicels, as was Antemnae, who were later expelled by the Aborigenes. Dionysius records a tradition according to which Romulus was at Caenina for a sacrifice during the festival of the Lupercalia, which was the occasion of the abduction of Remus by Numitor's shepherds. The town underwent synoecism and some of its cults and priests (sacerdotes) were transferred to Rome by Romulus, who celebrated his first triumph after conquering the Caeninenses and killing their king, Acron. However, according to Dionysius, Romulus allowed the Caeninenses to continue to live in their hometown, although they had to accept a colony of three hundred Romans and the allotment to them of one third of their land. The town is still mentioned at the beginning of the Republic: the Vindicius who revealed the plot of the Aquilii to Publius Valerius Publicola was a slave from Caenina captured in war.

The town name may be related to Latin caenum (mud, lime), itself a word with no Indoeuropean etymology. Another possibility is that it was of Celtic (Ligurian) origin.

=== Cameria or Camerium ===
Since Romulus made this town into a Roman colony, it fought many wars against Rome. In 502 BC it was destroyed, and its ruins have not yet been found; it was located to the north-east of Rome.

=== Collatia ===
Strabo places Collatia some 30 stades from Rome. Though by his time it had been reduced to farmland. The location of the site has not yet been identified with certainty, but it was located near modern Lunghezza, to the east of Rome. Likely it stood on the hill now occupied by the Castello di Lunghezza; which lies at the terminus of the ancient Via Collatina. The town was conquered and colonized by the Romans. Livy preserves the formula of their surrender, often cited as example of the deditio in fidem.

Collatia was founded by the Latin king Silvius of Alba Longa and it was the hometown of Lucius Tarquinius Collatinus, one of the first two consuls of the Roman Republic.

=== Curniculum or Corniculum ===
The town has been located by modern scholars in the present position of Montecelio (formerly Monticelli) in the comune of Guidonia, not far from Tibur. The two adjacent hills shaped like a pair of horns were the source of its name, and the nearby mountain range is still known as "Monti Cornicolani".

Near Montecelio, relics dating from the Iron Age and fragments of pottery from the 7th-6th centuries BC have been discovered. The town was destroyed by Tarquinius Priscus and was believed to be the hometown of Servius Tullius's mother, Ocresia.

=== Crustumerium or Crustumeria ===
The site of Crustumerium has been known since the 19th century. It is located in the hills of the Riserva Naturale park of Marcigliana Vecchia, to the north of Rome near Settebagni, on the Via Salaria. The town was also known as Castrimoenium and Crustumeria and has given its name to the surrounding countryside and hills known as "Ager Crustuminus" and "Montes Crustumini". According to Servius it was originally a settlement of the Sicels, founded by the Sicel Clitemnestrus. The etymology of the name is unclear and may reflect an ancient Pre-Indo European toponymic crustulum, meaning pond.

Crustumerium has been and is still being excavated by archaeologists and its study has been important for understanding urban development in Old Latium. It was located on one of the routes that linked Veii and Gabii, close to a ford on the Tiber, which fact, along with the richness of its countryside, was the cause of its importance and wealth.

The town stretched along a road trench and occupied an area of 60 hectares. It had walls that were a complex made by four or five parallel stretches connected by normal ones and covered with stone slabs. Tombs contained a rich production of fine pottery painted in white and red, weapons, and other instruments from the early Iron Age onward.

The town is mentioned in the Aeneid, and in the history of Rome it was involved in the abduction of the Sabine women and the subsequent war. Further, Romulus is said to have installed a colony of Romans there. Later it is frequently mentioned in the wars between Rome and its neighbors.

Literary sources put the destruction of Crustumerium at the end of the sixth century, but archaeologists have shown it was still occupied in the fifth century and declined only in the fourth century.

=== Ficana ===
Ficana was located on the left bank of the Tiber, downstream from Rome, near present-day Acilia on the highland over Monte Cugno. In ancient times, this provided an advantage as it was steeper and a dominant position on the river. Its identification is confirmed by the find of an inscription. The sources state that it was destroyed twice by Ancus Marcius in his drive to control the lower course of the Tiber and the salines, together with Politorium and Tellenae. Its importance was owed to the fact it was a port that afforded a commercial route to the hinterland toward the Alban Hills and Aricia.

Archaeologists have shown that it was still a prosperous centre during the 4th century and reached its maximum expansion after the Roman conquest. It declined only in the 4th and 3rd centuries after the development of Ostia. Excavations have unearthed the town wall, housing areas and a necropolis. Long-necked amphoras decorated with reliefs or scratches of a style typical of 7th-century Old Latium testify to the early quality of the local material culture. The Ficana site is now an archaeological park.

=== Medullium ===
Also known in the sources as Medullia, its exact location is unknown. It was the hometown of Hostus Hostilius's family and was conquered by Tullus Hostilius, although not destroyed. Its name suggests a relationship to the Ligurian tribe of the Medulli (Medylloi in Strabon IV 1, 11) and would appear to be cognate with the Celtic deity Meduna. Strabo mentions two other towns named Medullia, one in the western Alps in Gallia and one in the aastern Alps in Iapudia.

=== Politorium ===
Politorium has been identified in the archaic settlement found near Castel di Decima, south-east of Rome, but this identification lacks epigraphic confirmation. It is mentioned by Cato, who records its founding, and by Livy and Dionysius of Halicarnassos, who describe its capture and successive demolition by Ancus Marcius. Its inhabitants would have been deported to the Aventine. These facts are part of the first expansive drive by Rome toward the sea, which also brought about the fall of Ficana and Tellenae.

The excavations have uncovered remains of the fortifications and a princely necropolis.

=== Satricum ===
Satricum was recorded by Pliny as the first in his list of clara oppida. It was an important and ancient settlement of the Latin and other tribes and arose near the prehistoric sanctuary of Mater Matuta. It has been identified by archaeologists at Le Ferriere, in the present Province of Latina, and it was systematically excavated by the Royal Dutch Institute in Rome in collaboration with Italian authorities. During excavations in 1977 the inscription known as Lapis Satricanus was unearthed.

=== Scaptia ===
The town is mentioned by Livy as the eponymous settlement of the Roman tribe of the same name. Its location has not been identified, with some scholars suggesting that it was located near Tibur or near Passerano.

== Modern studies on the settlement of prehistoric Latium ==
=== Linguistic comparisons ===
Wolfgang Helbig was the first to remark that the name of Alba Longa and of many other Ligurian settlements, such as Albieis north of Massalia, with their centre Alba Augusta, as well as Albium (Albion) Intemelium (now Ventimiglia), Albium (Albion) Ingaunum (now Albenga) and Alba Pompeia in Italy, could hardly mean "white", from the Latin adjective albus, since the rocks in the area of volcanic Mount Albanus are deep grey in colour. Giuseppe Sergi remarked that the early name of the Tiber was Albula, a name that recurs elsewhere in hydronymy where there are traces of Ligurians and Sicels. Further evidence connecting Ligures and Siculi was provided by a Neolithic skeleton unearthed at Sgurgola near Anagni that was painted red, as were the ones found in the Ligurian cave of the "Arene Candide". Sergi concluded that Ligures and Siceli were in fact just one ethnic group, but since they lived far apart, they had come to be considered as two distinct nations. Their identity could be confirmed by ancient toponyms found in Latium as well as other regions of Italy. Strabon also mentions that a former name for the Alps was Albia.

Other correspondences include the ancient name of the Lake of Bracciano, Sabatinus Lacus and the town of Sabate on its shores, and the river Sāpis in Umbria, names based on a Pre-Indo-European root *sāb- meaning water, seen also in the name Vada Sabatia (today Vado Ligure).

== Economy ==
The land of Old Latium was mostly fertile, and agriculture was practiced in the lowlands since an early time. In the lowlands, cereals and legumes were grown. In the hills, grapes were planted, and wines such as Setinus, Albanus, and Signinus, were of good quality. In the highlands, animal husbandry took the place of food production as an economic force.

Gabii had famous quarries of red travertine stone, which was used as building material in the surrounding area, Rome included. Crafts, such as smithing and pottery, were also developed.

Diseases like malaria were restricted to coastal areas and a few other locations.

== See also ==
- Latium — all periods.
- New Latium
- History of Lazio
- History of Rome
