= Castello di Decima (Rome) =

- Rome, Italy

Site information
- Website: http://www.castellodidecima.it/home/

Location
- Coordinates: 41°45′20″N 12°26′21″E

Site history
- Built: 1768

The Castello di Decima is a fortified building in Rome (Italy), in the frazione Castel di Decima. It is a structure closed by four arms, with a crenellated entrance accompanied by a tower. In the center, there is an internal courtyard with a circular fountain. Inside the castle rises the small church of Sant'Andrea apostolo in Castel di Decima.

The building occupies a part of an early medieval fortification that stood at the tenth mile of the Via Laurentina, the Roman road which led to Lavinium (now Pratica di Mare).

== History ==
On a hill to the southeast, the excavations conducted since 1971 have found a vast necropolis of the 8th–7th century BC, attributable to an urban center identified as Politorium or Tellena. In the ancient necropolis, there is evidence of a funerary ritual in which—following the internment of the deceased within the fossa but prior to the inclusion of the burial goods—pottery fragments were deposited in the grave.

The first document that mentions a castrum pontis Decimi dates back to 1081 and confirms its possession by the monastery of St. Paul. It then passed to the monastery of St. Alexius, in emphyteusis to the Frangipanes, and to the monastery of St. Sabbas.

In the 16th century it was owned by the hospital of Santo Spirito and in the 18th century it belonged to Cardinal Ludovico Maria Torriggiani, Secretary of State of Pope Clement XIII, who rebuilt it in its present form in 1768.

== The fortified complex ==
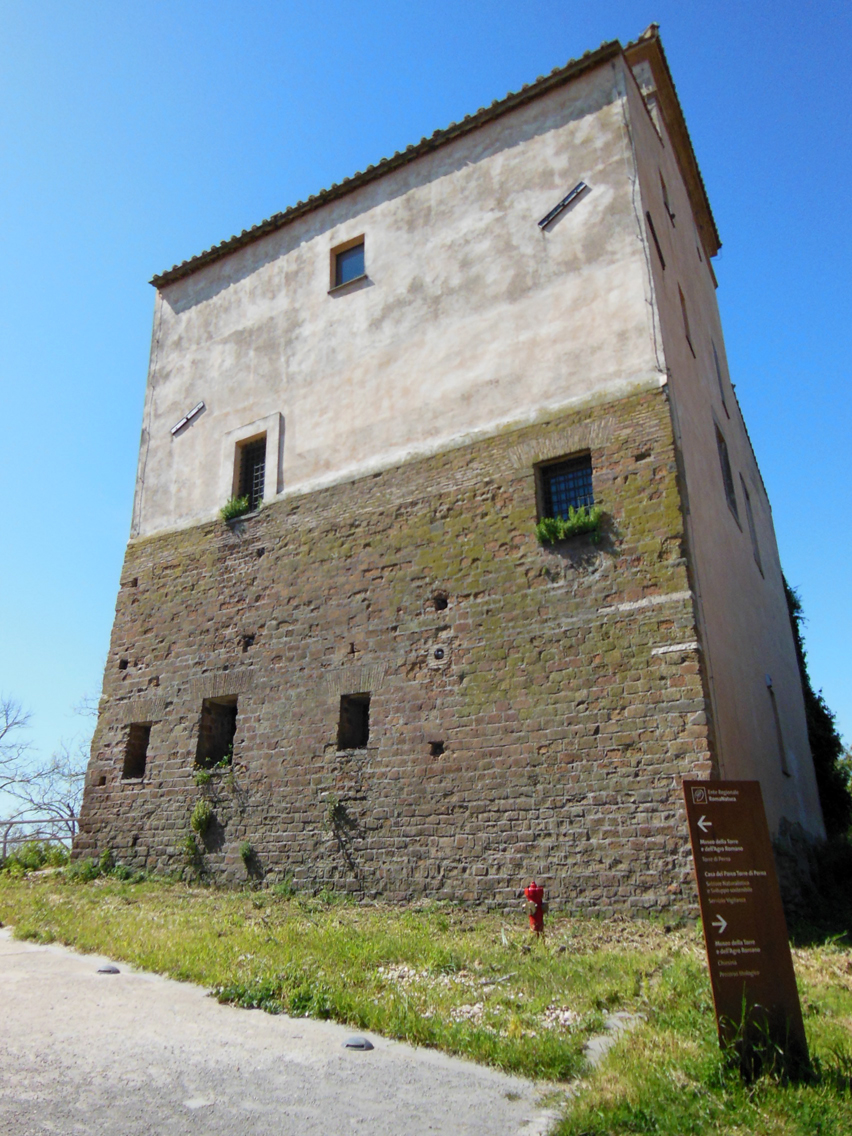
The tower of Perna.

The fortified complex of the former castle included the casale of Perna (with an ancient tower), the mill of Malpasso and the tower of Decima. When the defensive need ceased, the early medieval fortifications were generally transformed into farmhouses (casali) during the Renaissance.

=== Tower or casale of Perna ===
The construction of the tower dates back to the 11th century, but its existence is attested only from the beginning of the 16th century, when the documents mention it as a "castle". The transformation in its present form dates back to this period, when the original height was probably reduced and buttresses were added. The first floor of the interior is supported by cross vaults. Near the former entrance door, which opened on the first floor, fragments of medieval decoration are walled up.

The tower or castle was owned by the Muti family (documents dated 1512 and 1518). In 1560 the archbishop of Amalfi Massimo Massimi sold it to the cardinal Federico Cesi and in 1660 it was owned by Pompeo Colonna, prince of Gallicano. In 1704 it belonged to the Conti family and in 1711 to the Colonna family. In 1734 it was sold to the Torrigiani family, who joined it to the estate of the castle of Decima, together which the neighboring estates of Fossola, Morrone, Pernuzza, Pinzarone and Campobufalaro, for a total area of almost 2,500 hectares.

Near the tower rises a chapel, already existing in the 17th century, showing a simple façade with angular pilasters and tuff doorposts.

On 2 July 1977 the estate, which became a municipal property and was left uncultivated, was occupied: a farm was created, which is still active today with the name of Cooperative Agricoltura nuova.

The tower of Perna currently is the seat of the Decima-Malafede Nature Reserve; the WWF has set up a visitor center nearby.

In the surroundings of the tower rose two Roman villas.

== Bibliography ==
- Giovanni Maria De Rossi (1967). "Tellenae". Forma Italiae. Topografia antica. Vol. 11. Rome: De Luca.
- Holloway, Ross R. (1996). The Archaeology of Early Rome and Latium. Routledge. doi:10.4324/9781315800127. ISBN 978-1-317-76160-0.
