= Caecuban wine =

Caecuban wine (Latin: Caecubum, Greek: Kaikoubos) came from a small territory, ager Caecubus, at Amyclae in coastal Latium (in the region known today as the Plain of Fondi). Around 70 BC, Varro already regarded this district as a place of legendary wealth. Strabo described the area's reputation for wine in his Geography: "The Caecuban Plain borders on the Gulf of Caieta; and next to the plain comes Fundi, situated on the Appian Way. All these places produce exceedingly good wine; indeed, the Caecuban and the Fundanian and the Setinian belong to the class of wines that are widely famed, as is the case with the Falernian, the Alban and the Statanian." (Geography V.3.6)

== Characteristics ==
To many in the 1st century BC, Caecuban was the best of all wines, smoother than Falernian wine, fuller than Alban wine, strong and intoxicating. It was a white wine which turned fire-coloured as it aged. Dioscorides describes it as glykys "sweet". Athenaeus describes it as overpowering and strong, maturing only after many years time (Deipnosophistae, I.27a).

== Occurrences in Horace Odes ==
As a testament to its popularity, Caecuban wine makes several appearances in the odes of Horace. In Ode 1.20, Horace gives Caecuban a greater stature than Falernian as he invites his prominent friend, Maecenas to drink with him.

Then thou shalt drink Caecuban and the juice
of grapes crushed by Cales' presses; my cups
are flavoured neither with the product of
Falernum's vines nor of the Formian hills.

Horace mentions Caecuban often in connection with celebrating particularly momentous occasions, such as Octavian’s defeat of Antony and Cleopatra.(Odes 1.37.5) and in Ode IX where he speaks again to Maecenas,

When, O happy Maecenas, shall I,
overjoyed at Caesar’s being victorious,
drink with you under the stately dome (for so it pleases Jove)
the Caecuban reserved for festal entertainments,
while the lyre plays a tune, accompanied with flutes,
that in the Doric, these in the Phrygian measure?

== Decline and disappearance ==
The popularity of Caecuban seemed to have hit its apex in Horace’s time. Following the ascension of Augustus to power, Setinum was declared the Imperial wine-namely (according to Pliny) because it did not cause him indigestion and it rose in popularity accordingly (Natural History XIV.61). Pliny noted that the vineyard was starting to fall into neglect when Nero tore up the area, under the pretence of a planned ship canal across the land, in order to undertake excavations to find the legendary treasure of Dido which was supposed to have been buried there. The destruction of Caecuban’s single vineyard extinguished the wine completely; but in Martial’s time, if his words can be relied on, Caecuban wine was still maturing in cellars at Amyclae. Galen is the last person on record to have tasted Caecuban wine, nearly a century after it ceased to be made.

== Grape varieties ==
Among the grape varieties that have been speculated to be behind the ancient wine is the Abbuoto grape that is still grown in the Lazio region of central Italy today. However, wine experts and historians such as Jancis Robinson and Julia Harding cast doubt that the red Abbuoto grape was likely responsible for the ancient white wine.

== See also ==
- Ancient Rome and wine
