= Castel di Decima =

- Castel di Decima (Italian)
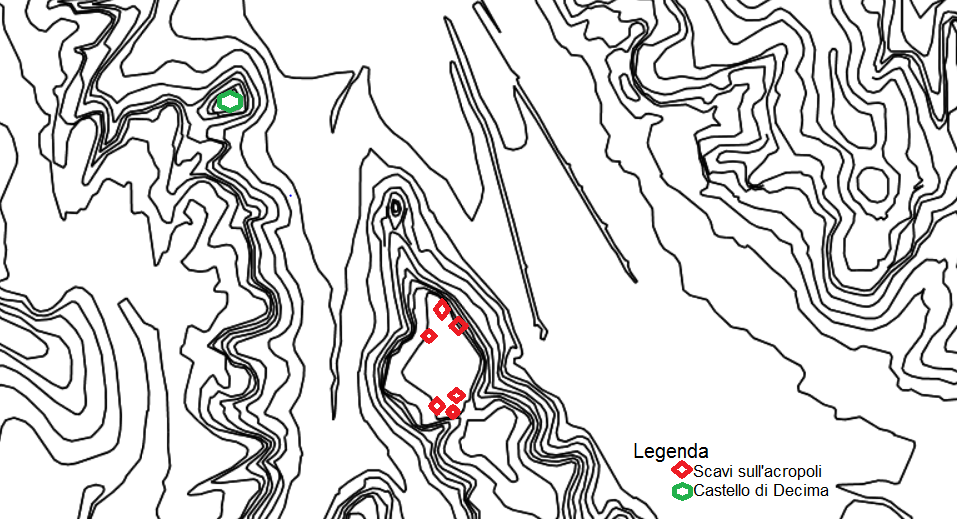
- Topography of the site
- Interactive map of Castel di Decima
- 41°45′5.24″N 12°26′40.67″E
- Type: Settlement and necropolis site
- Periods: Latial periods III-IVB
- Cultures: Latial culture
- Location: Lazio, Italy

History
- Built: 8th-century BCE
- Abandoned: 6th-century BCE

Site notes
- Discovered: 1953

Castel di Decima is an ancient Latial archaeological site in Lazio, Italy, consisting of a settlement area and a necropolis.

== Excavation ==
This site was first discovered in 1953, as part of a construction project on the Via Pontina, during the course of which, several of the tombs were damaged. The artifacts found at the site in 1953 were stored in the Museo delle Terme. No systemic excavation was conducted in the area until 1971, when the Via Pontina was widened. Archaeological work continued at Castel di Decima until 1975. Since the cemetery was located on the border of the territory supervised by the archaeological superintendencies of Rome and Ostia, both organizations were involved in the excavation. The settlement area was excavated from 1971-1972 by the archaeologists M. Guaitoli and F. Piccarreta, whose work was later followed by another dig lasting from 1975-1978.

== Settlement ==
Castel di Decima is situated on volcanic terrain in a plateau situated between two valleys. Atop the plateau lay an ancient settlement site, defended by various walls, including two aggers, one of which demarcated the southern end of the site. On the northernmost part of the settlement, the remains of ancient wall composed of square cappellaccio blocks dating to the 6th-century BCE were discovered. At the point where the wall intersected with a road, there was found a gate. It is likely that in antiquity the site had an acropolis-like structure that would have served as a defensible area for the inhabitants. The terracing on the south side of the acropolis was constructed in two distinct phases during the 9th-century BCE, the first of which was situated atop a layer of domestic remains, implying that the site was already inhabited.

The location of the settlement was advantageous for maritime trade; it was located by the shoreline, and also near a tributary of the Tiber, which is now naught more than a small stream, though the floodplain indicates that it was once much larger. During ancient times, the river would have enhanced the defensibility of the site, all while also facilitating trade and communication with the rest of Latium vetus. Moreover, the settlement is located less than 10 kilometres (6.2 mi) from Rome, and alongside a route connecting Rome and the inner parts of Latium, thereby granting Decima the ability to control commerce across the Alban Hills region. In terms of trade resources, the site was located within the vicinity of the salt beds in the marshes on the left bank of the Tiber. Besides all of the aforementioned benefits, the coastal location of the site was also beneficial for transhumance, as flocks of sheep could spend their winters at the coastline and then move inland during the summer, where the grass would remain fresh and green during the hot months.

The site has been identified as the location of Politorium, a Latin said to have been destroyed by Ancus Marcius (r. 640 – 616 BCE), himself a legendary king of Rome. However, according to the archaeologist Bertha Tilly, the evidence for this theory is quite weak, relying only on the geographic proximity to Ficana and Tellenae, both of which were supposedly destroyed around the same time as Politorium. Yet, according to legend, the populace of Politorium were relocated to the Aventine Hill following its destruction, which would have occurred sometime in the 7th-century BCE, whereas archaeological evidence suggests that the site at Decima remained inhabited up until the end of 6th-century BCE. Another theory suggests that Castel di Decima was one of the Alban cities mentioned by the 1st-century BCE poet Virgil, and it might have been associated with the Rivus Albanus ("Alban River"), which may have given its name to the rest of the surrounding region. This theory is also problematic, for there is no evidence for this suggestion beyond the presence of a river beside Decima, and—according to Tilly—it is unlikely that such a wealthy and significant Latial city would have such as a generic name. Alternatively, Tilly suggests that the site is to be identified as that of Laurentum, for it situated on the Via Laurentina, and the early ancient Roman roads were named after the cities to which they led.

== Funerary customs ==
=== Design and layout of graves ===
The site contains around 350 tombs dating from the 9th to the 7th centuries BCE. Whereas no material from the sole known cemetery dates past c. 600 BCE, the nearby settlement itself remained occupied for some time, implying that they continued to deposit their dead as some other necropolis. Regardless, all tombs at the one known cemetery consist of fossa inhumations either covered in stone or, during the early 6th century, earth. According to the historian Tim Cornell, the stones was probably piled up high enough to slightly protrude from the grave, so as to mark the burial site. During period III, tombs at the site began to include a hollowed-out niche in the side the fossa, within which burial items could be stored. The niche remained in use at Castle di Decima until the end of the 8th-century, after which point it disappeared, though it remained present in other Latial sites such as Riserva del Truglio. The graves are organized into small clusters, each containing sets of burials situated closely together, and all emanating from the central nucleus of the site during the 8th-century BCE. The burial clusters, of which seven have been identified so far, likely represented kinship clans, with each entombed person belonged to the same family. The individuals within the tombs are sometimes chronologically separated from each other by upwards of twenty-five years, indicating that these clusters were maintained by singular families over multiple generations.

The majority of the graves at the site are oriented in a northwest-southeast fashion, though—for unknown reasons—there are some that are positioned at right angles adjacent to the more typical tombs. The oddly oriented burials also lack any funerary goods. One possible explanation for this phenomenon is that the right-angle burials date to the 6th-5th centuries BCE, at which time—throughout the rest of Latium—there was a sudden cessation in the practice of offering grave goods. However, the style of the tombs themselves is more reminiscent of Orientalizing period burials rather than anything of even the late 7th century, and, moreover, these right-angle burials are spread out across the whole site, not concentrated in one specific space, which may further contradict the notion that they belonged to one particular time frame.

=== Funerary rite ===
Evidence from the site attests to a funerary ritual wherein the deceased was first placed into the fossa trench while fully clothed. The grave goods were most typically placed by the feet during phase III, but during phase IV, they were usually deposited on the opposite side of the trench. Not all burials obeyed these patterns; for instance, the funerary items in one tumulus burial—dated to around 750-725 BCE, during Latial III—are not situated by the feet, and some are in fact located outside of the fossa. This particular burial is also unusual in that there is no evidence of a corpse, perhaps indicating this tomb is actually a cenotaph. Remains of broken pottery shards have been found within tombs, sometimes placed underneath the personal grave goods, suggesting that—following the deposition of the corpse—pottery vessels were ceremonially broken, and then the personal ornaments were deposited. The vessels themselves were amphorae and ollae, both of which were related to the consumption of wine, and therefore the ceremonial breaking of these objects constituted some sort of libation ritual. The most common types of ritual vessels found at Castel di Decima are the dark brown impasto Latial amphorae, which frequently was also marked by spiral designs, and also—particularly in the later periods—a type of red impasto olla with grooved vertical decorations. Etruscan ware, however, though present in the tombs, was never used in this ceremony. In any case, given that the vessels related to the consumption of wine, it is likely that the ceremonial breaking of these objects constituted some sort of libation ritual. Over thirty examples of this libation rite at Decima have been identified, all of which date to the 7th-century BCE.

=== Grave goods ===
==== Early periods ====
Most burials have either no grave goods or only a select set of bronze personal ornaments, though there are some more wealthy tombs. Female burials contained extravagant ornaments, such as fibulae fashioned from gold or silver or ornamented with amber discs. In female graves, fibulae have been found situated near the heads of the deceased, and silver fibulae in particular are always found situated by the breasts. Fibulae would have been used to secure the clothing of women, with one fibula placed on each shoulder, both of which were used to fasten the main garment. The fibulae located by the heads were probably used to secure mantles or shawls, and other fibulae were used to fasten large bronze rings that have also been uncovered at Castel di Decima. The largest of these bronze rings is composed of a thin bronze sheet and reaches up to 42 centimetres (17 in) in diameter. Female graves also contained silver coils used to adorn hair and amber or glass paste beads that decorated robes. Besides personal adornments, female burials also included items related to domestic responsibilities, such as numerous clay spindle whorls and also four wooden baskets covered in bronze strips with cutout designs. The baskets themselves have since decayed, but the bronze strips have survived, thereby attesting to their former existence.

Tomb 132, a burial of an adult woman, consists of a 2.7-by-1.1-metre (8.9 ft × 3.6 ft) trench including a 2.4-by-0.5-metre (7.9 ft × 1.6 ft) wooden coffin or tree trunk within which the deceased, and adult woman, was buried. Due to the presence of impasto pottery ware, the grave has been dated to period IIb. The woman was laid on her side, and her skeleton was decorated with personal ornaments, while numerous other grave goods surrounded her corpse. She was probably wrapped in a shroud, itself likely decorated with hundreds of copper alloy knobs. By her legs, samples of copper alloy studs and bluish glass beads were found. One necklace was also discovered in this burial, with amber likely imported from the Baltic. Many of the finds from this grave are typical for Latium vetus, such as the pottery assemblage, which included four bowls with raised handles, a stand, an amphora, and a jar. Other items, however, are less common, such one Coppa Peroni, a type of bowl, which finds parallels in a Phoenician vessel from Francavilla Marittima and another one discovered in Bologna. Some of the burial items at the site are related to banqueting, such as one 41-centimetre (16 in) spit found in the grave, the aforementioned four bowls, and possibly a copper alloy knife. According to the archaeologist Albert Nijboer, this tomb is the earliest one in Italy that contains a spit. Later, at Decima—by phase III—there are a total of six female tombs that contain both a spit and a knife.

Male burials also contain fibulae, usually of the "dragon" type, which was most frequently placed on the right shoulder. Bronze bracelets have also been discovered in male burials, implying that men at Castel di Decima wore a sleeveless garment. Tomb 15, one particularly wealthy male grave at Decima, measures 5.3 by 4.8 metres (17 ft × 16 ft) in size, and is therefore twice as large as the other tombs at the site. In terms of grave goods, the burial included a silver fibula, a silver cup, a fan, bronze vases, two horse-bits, fragments of a wagon, a Phoenician wine amphora, three Thapsos cups, a wooden object—possibly a scepter—and also iron weapons. The round bronze fan found in this burial is among the then fans known from Latium Vetus, and it is typical in style, consisting of a tubular bronze handled riveted onto a wooden shaft at least 55 centimetres (22 in) in size.

Weapons, such as lances and swords, are almost unilaterally present in male burials at this site. Lances pacifistically appear in thirty-four tombs, usually located the right of the deceased individual, and almost always—save for one exception—pointed downwards. Swords are far less common in male burials at Castel di Decima, though when present, they were placed at either the head or the feet. Combinations of swords and lances appear in some graves, but only those of the wealthy. Out of 27 tombs from period III, five had only swords, ten had only lances, and twelve had both swords and spears. Amongst a sample of 26 tombs dating to period IV, fifteen have spears while only eleven have swords, and the graves of the former group are less lavish than the graves of the latter. The spear burials largely lack any personal ornaments or imported wares, though they do have certain metal vases. In contrast, the sword burials are marked by a plethora of personal ornaments and imported goods, and, moreover, three graves including swords also contain chariots. According to Cornell, the differences in social status between these burials are probably reflective of the Roman distinction between hastati and principes, with the individuals buried with spears representing the former group, and those inhumed with swords representing the latter.

==== Orientalizing period ====
Castel di Decima, during the Orientalizing period, became extremely prosperous and the wealth of the tombs increased greatly. For example, in one Orientalizing period female tomb from Castel di Decima, tomb 101—the "Tomb of the Princess"—the dead body was covered in a silver net bedecked with around a hundred amber beads alternating with vitreous blue paste. Moreover, on her breast was located a gold ornament also decorated with amber beads. This same tomb also contains a chariot, making it the only one of the six known tombs at the site to include a two-wheeled chariot. During the Orientalizing period, Latial tombs contained types of shields covered by a thin bronze sheet decorated in repoussé. For instance, tomb 21 at Castel di Decima, which dates to around 775-750 BCE, contains three examples of such shields laid over the body of the deceased. Alongside the shields, the grave included a lance with a bronze head and a pointed sauroter, a chariot, an iron sword with a bronze sheath, and a rectangular bronze breastplate. However, by the later Orientalizing period, during Latial IVB, the tomb furniture becomes less ostentatious and less numerous.

During the 7th-century, male graves came to primarily contain banqueting items—in particular, male graves of this period are identified by a type of holmos vessel consisting of a large pottery stand characterized by perforated walls. Tombs began to adopt foreign symposium equipment, replacing the earlier, natively Italic items utilized as part of preexisting banqueting customs. For example, tomb 21 included a tripod, a basin, four iron spits, and three impasto bowls—all of which are objects associated with the symposium and Levantine in origin. Moreover, the tomb contained four ribbed bowls—the earliest known so far in Italy—that were imported from the Near East, where they were associated with the upper-class. The new, imported symposium equipment appears to have replaced native items used for a preexisting banqueting custom. According to Nijboer, the tripod and basin of tomb 21 appear to have replaced the ceramic stand and one of the large ceramic vessels of tomb 132. Furthermore, the singular spit of tomb 132 has multiplied to four spits in tomb 21. Tomb 21 is the earliest male tomb at Decima that contained spits, whereas female tombs showcased spits as early as phase III.

Pyxides, a vessel otherwise associated with female burials in earlier burials, are now found in male graves, such as at tomb 152 in Decima, which is dated to the first quarter of the 7th-century BCE. The pyxides were perhaps once used to store personal ornaments belonging to women, but evidence from Ficana suggests that they were—at least by this period—used to store food. This tomb also contained drinking and serving vessels, as well as a 6.6-by-3.5-centimetre (2.6 in × 1.4 in) grater and utensils used for the roasting of meat. One straw fan was also found at Decima in tomb 50, itself dated to the second quarter of the 7th-century BCE. Besides the fan, this tomb also contained numerous pieces of pottery and metal artifacts, such as bronze and iron antenna swords.

In the ensuing years, tombs at Decima begin to include more Greek artifacts amongst their collections of foreign imports. The earliest known specimens of Greek pottery at Decima appear during phase III, within tombs that also contain Levantine material. At tomb 5, an adult male burial belonging to phase IVa—dated around 750-725 BCE—included Near Eastern goods such as a Phoenician transport amphora and tripod bowl, alongside Greek material, including three Proto-Corinthian bowls and two aryballoi, one of which was Proto-Corinthian. Amongst the remainder of the items found in the grave, there was a silver skyphos, a fan, silver jewelry, impasto drinking cups, impasto rosso wares, iron weaponry, a chariot, and also a set of symposium equipment, including tripods and various copper alloy vessels, such as five ribbed bowls. Since the content of this tomb derives from various different cultures, it is not possible to conclusively determine the ethnicity of the merchants who brought these goods to the site, though—according to Nijboer—the materials probably arrived on a Phoenician trade vessel, since Phoenician transport amphorae have been found at Decima, yet no Greek ones have been identified.

At the same time, female burials also began to include more banqueting equipment, such as bowls for mixing wine, which—according to the archaeologist Ross Holloway—seem to have exclusively appeared in the graves of women. Tombs with large mixing bowls also contained vast quantities of other pieces of pottery, such as cups, jugs, and small amphorae, all of which was now made professionally by a potter's wheel. Furthermore, Punic amphorae—perhaps imported from Sardinia—was also popular during this time period, the red style of which perhaps came to influence other vessels at the site, for many other pieces of pottery were also characterized by a red color. These Punic amphorae attest to the importation of foreign wine, which—according to the archaeologist Gary Forsythe—were probably displayed at banquets so as to demonstrate the host's wealth. The presence of such banqueting equipment in women's burials indicates that Latial matrons of the Orientalizing period were responsible for hosting symposia, and perhaps even pouring the wine.
