= Abbuoto =

Variety of grape

- Grape (Vitis)
- Color of berry skin: Black
- Species: Vitis vinifera
- Origin: Italy
- Notable wines: Lazio
- VIVC number: 7

Abbuoto is a red Italian wine grape variety that is grown primarily in the Lazio region of central Italy. Historically the grape was believed to be responsible for the Ancient Roman wine Caecubum that was praised by writers such as Pliny the Elder and Horace but historians and wine experts such as Jancis Robinson and Julia Harding note that connection is likely erroneous.

The grape is primarily used as a blending variety where it often contributes body, phenolics and high alcohol levels. As of 2000, there were 717 hectares (1,772 acres) of the grape planted in Italy.

Some ampelographers suspect that the Lazio grape variety San Giuseppe nero may be related to (or possibly a clone) of Abbuoto but so far DNA analysis has not yet confirmed such suspicions.

== Origins ==
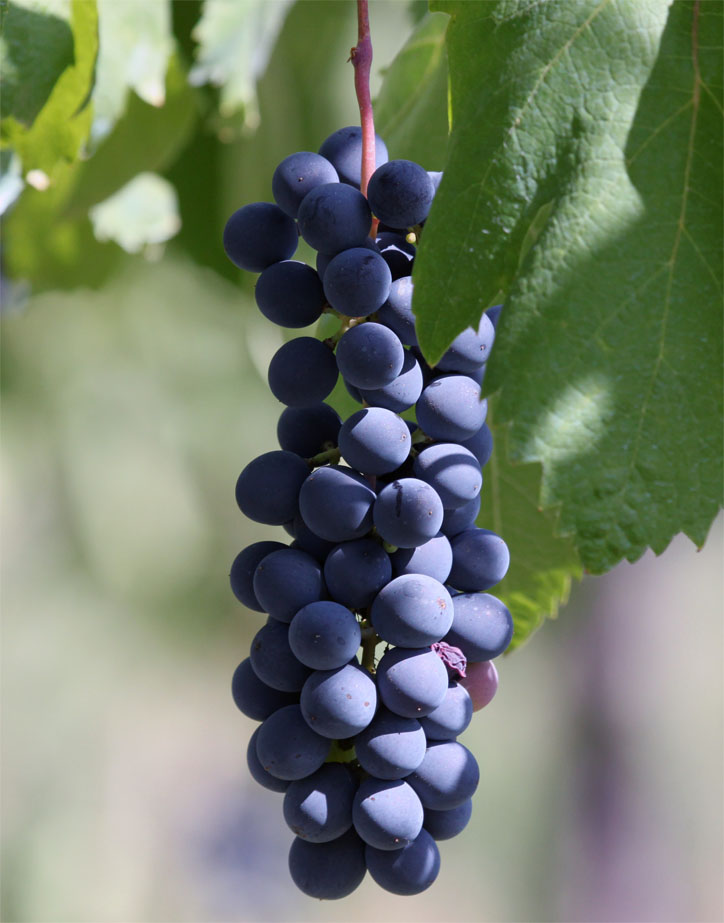
Piedirosso, one of the grapes believed to be a parent of Abbuoto.

DNA profiling has not definitively revealed Abbuoto's origin though the grape is almost definitely indigenous to central Italy. A 2010 study from an Italian research team suggested that Abbuoto is a crossing of the Campanian red grape varieties Piedirosso and Casavecchia, however addition results from the same 2010 research also posited that the relationship between Abbuoto and Casavecchia may actually be reversed with Casavecchia being a cross of Abbuto and Malvasia Bianca di Candia.

Caecuban wine (Latin: Caecubum, Greek: Kaikoubos, Italian: Cècubo) was produced on a small vineyard in the low lying marshy region, south of Terracina (today's southern Lazio and northern Campania). The synonym Cècubo derived from the belief that Abbuoto was the variety used to provide the famous Caecuban wine mentioned in the odes of Horace and Pliny the Elder. However Caecuban was a white wine, which following a standard Roman practice was aged for a number of years, during which it changed gaining a color of the "flames". The vintage was destroyed in the middle of the 1st century and Caecuban never recovered, however the name became a generic term for wine with the characteristic color of the true wine. Small quantities of undistinguished red wine called Cècubo are produced in the district today. An Italian wine expert and connoisseur Mimmo Albano tells a story that in some of the marshy areas around Lake Fondi about 50 miles south of Rome, there were some old, neglected vines of a type that was thought to be the ancient Abbuoto. Cuttings were taken from these vines and nursed back to health. The healthy vines were definitely different from any other variety currently known, and the claim that they are the same as the ancient Abbuoto has remained unchallenged.

== Viticulture ==
The Abbuoto vine tends to produces large dark colored berries with thick skins. The grape tends to ripens in the middle of the harvest season (early to mid October depending on the vintage year) but can be prone to producing irregular and inconsistent yields.

== Wine regions ==
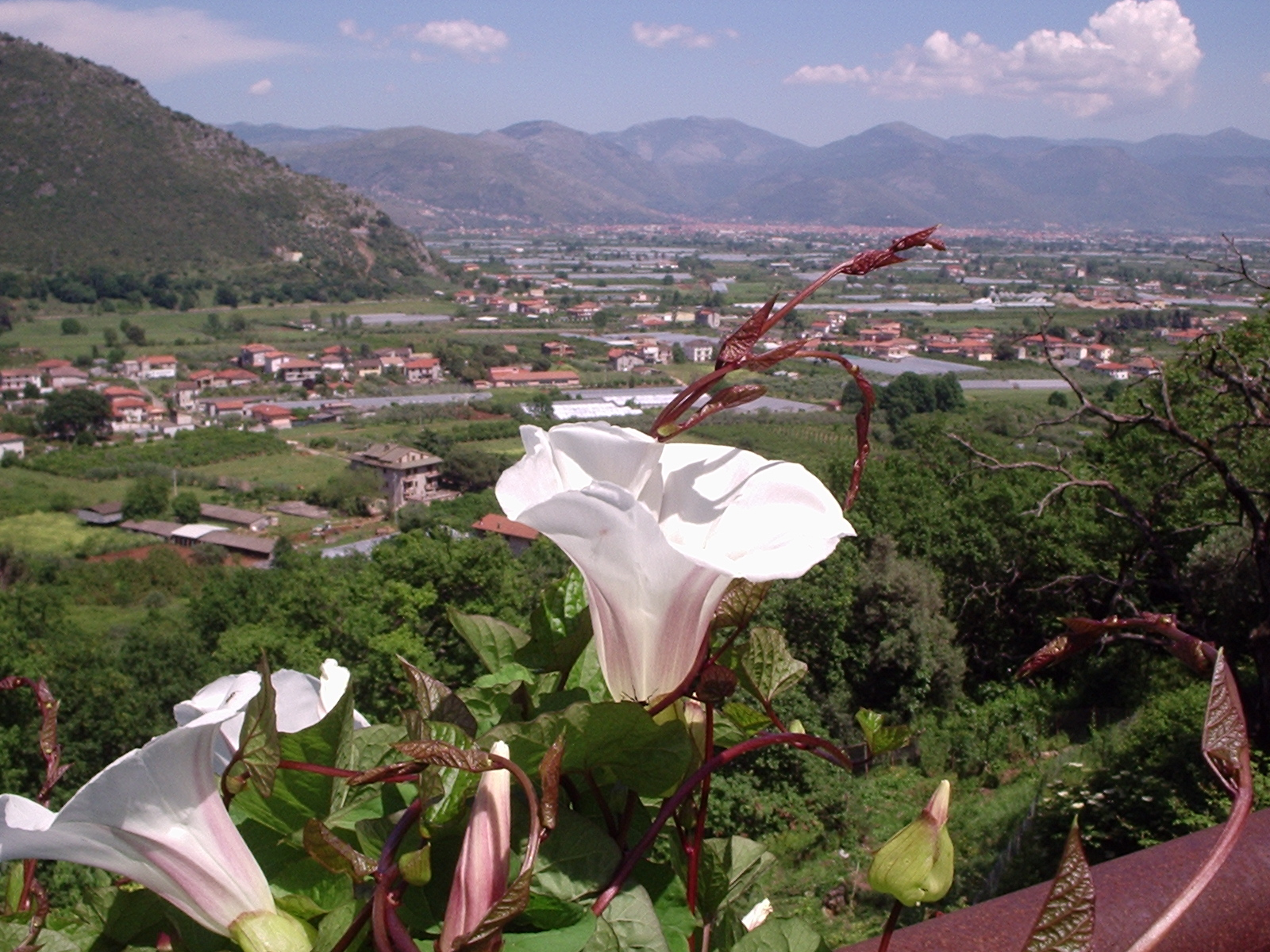
Abbuoto is planted throughout the Lazio region, including around the commune of Fondi (pictured).

Abbuoto is found primarily in the Lazio region of central Italy where it associated with the villages of Fiuggi, Fondi, Formia, Monte San Biagio and Terracina. There is also some plantings in Campania around Sessa Aurunca where the grape is often blended with Piedirosso and Primitivo. As of 2000, there were 717 ha (1,772 acres) of the variety planted throughout Italy.

=== DOC wines ===
Abbuoto is a permitted grape variety in several Denominazione di origine controllata (DOC) regions including the Aprilia DOC where the grape can be produced as a varietal wine provided that the wine is composed of at least 95% of the grape. In the Atina DOC, up to 15% Abbuoto with other local red grape varieties can be blended in the DOC red wine along with Cabernet Sauvignon (50-70% of the blend), Syrah (10-30%), Merlot (10-30%) and Cabernet franc (10-30%). Abbuoto grapes destined for DOC wine producing in Atina must harvested to a yield no greater than 12 tonnes/ha with the finished wine attaining a minimum alcohol level of at least 12%. A separate Riserva bottling can also be produced provided the wine attains a minimum alcohol level of at least 12.5% and is aged at least two years prior to release.

In the Castelli Romani DOC, up to 15% Abbuoto with other local red grape varieties can be blended in the DOC red wine along with Cesanese Comune, Sangiovese, Montepulciano, Nero Buono and Merlot. For the DOC red wines, the grapes must be harvested toa maximum yield no greater than 12 tonnes/ha with the finished wine needing to attain a minimum alcohol levels of at least 11%. In the Genazzano DOC, up to 20% Abbuoto with other local red grape varieties can be blended in the DOC red wine along with Sangiovese (70-90% of the blend) and Cesanese (10-30%). Here on the southern slopes of Monti Prenestini south of Rome, the grapes are harvested up to a maximum yield of 14 tonnes/ha with the finished wine attaining a minimum alcohol level of at least 11%.

In the large Tarquinia DOC that expands across the Viterbo and Rome province, up to 30% Abbuoto with other local red grape varieties can be blended in the DOC red wine along with Sangiovese and/or Montepulciano which either separate or together must account for at least 60% of the blend and Cesanese which makes up to 25% of the blend. Grapes are limited to a maximum yield of 12 tonnes/ha with the finished wine needing to attain a minimum alcohol level of 10.5%. A novello wine can also be produced with the same blending requirements and a minimum alcohol level of at least 11%.

== Synonyms ==
Over the years Abbuoto has been known under a variety of synonyms including Aboto and Cecubo.
