= San Giuseppe nero =

Variety of grape

San Giuseppe nero is a red Italian wine grape variety that is grown in central Italy where it is a permitted variety in the Indicazione geografica tipica (IGT) wines of the Lazio region. Some plantings of the grape can be found in southern Italy which combined with the central Italy plantings gave San Giuseppe nero a total of 387 hectares (960 acres) reported in the official 2000 Italian viticultural census.

== History ==
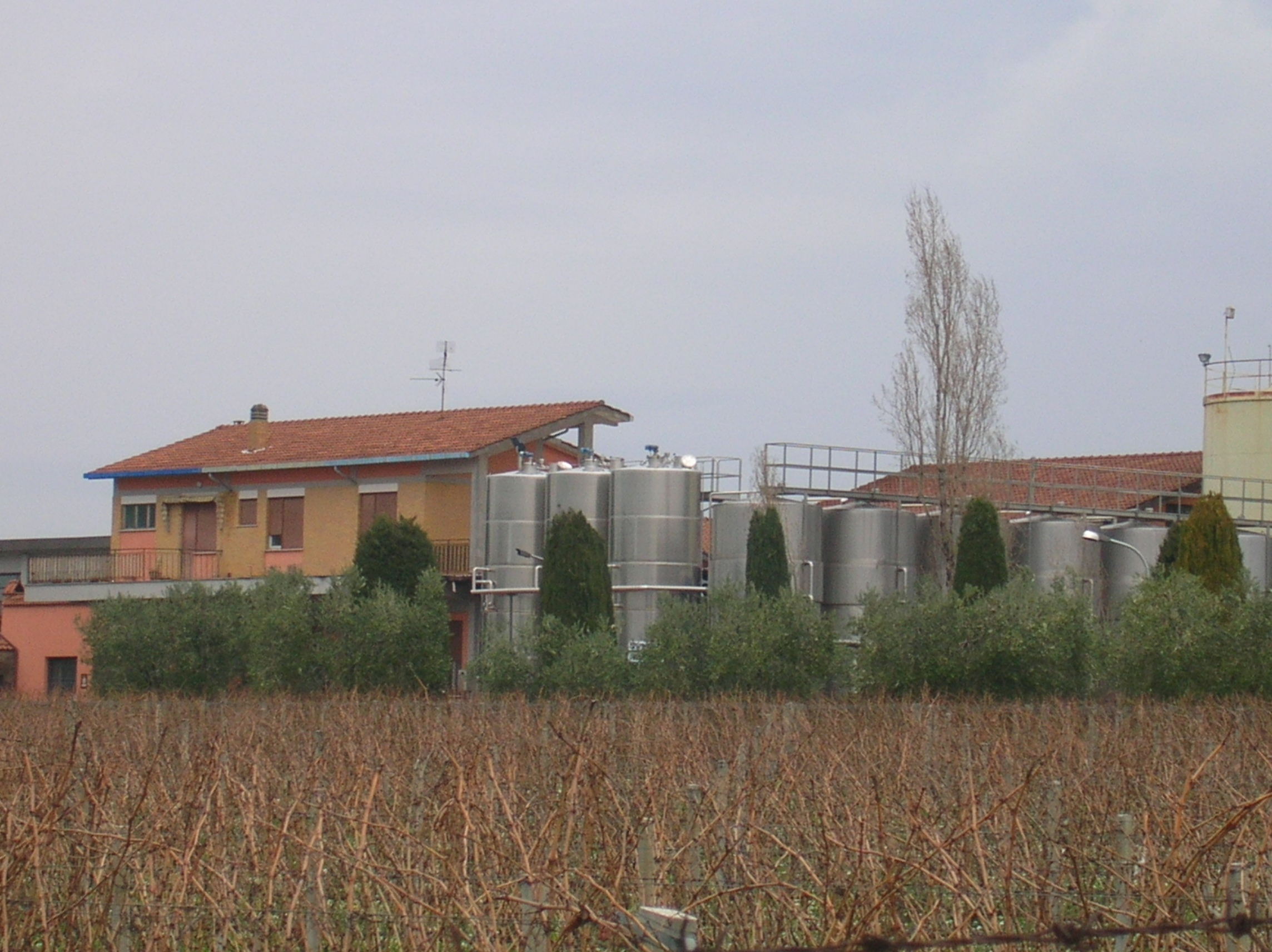
San Giuseppe nero is a permitted variety in some of the IGT red blends from the Lazio region (vineyard and winery from region pictured).

The exact origins of San Giuseppe nero are not yet known though some ampelographers suspect that the grape variety maybe related (or possibly a clone) of old Lazio grape variety Abbuoto but so far DNA analysis has not yet confirmed such suspicions.

== Synonyms ==
Over the years, San Giuseppe nero has been known under a variety of synonyms including: Saint Joseph noir and S. Giuseppe nero.
