= Mostardas =

Municipality of Rio Grande do Sul, Brazil

- Municipality
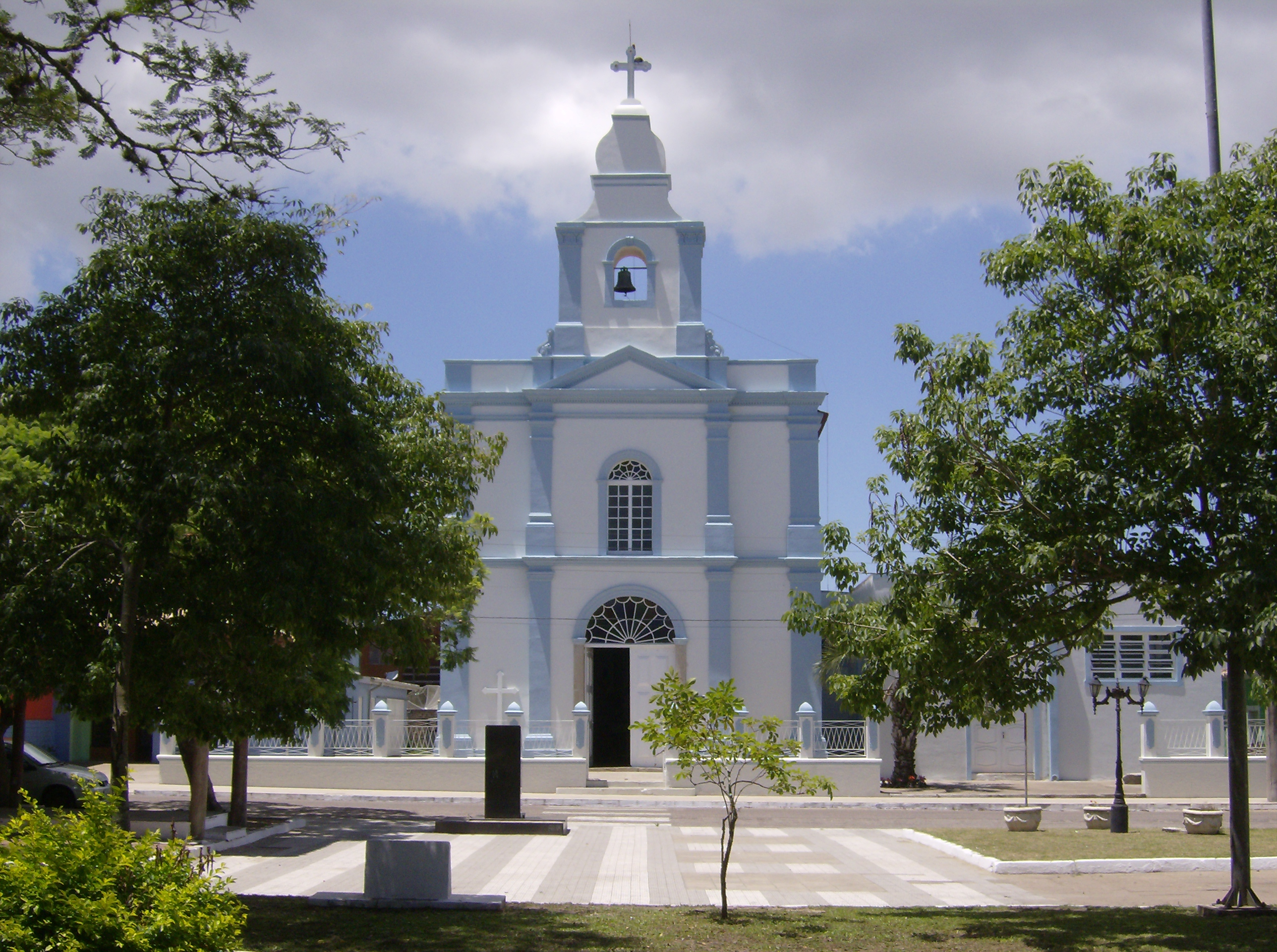

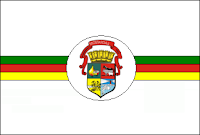
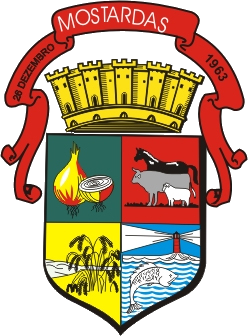
- Flag Coat of arms

- Location within Rio Grande do Sul

- Location in Brazil
- Coordinates: 31°06′S 50°57′W
- Country: Brazil
- State: Rio Grande do Sul

Population (2020)
  - Total: 12,847
- Time zone: UTC−3 (BRT)

Mostardas is a municipality in the state of Rio Grande do Sul, Brazil. Mostardas is twinned with Aprilia.

== History ==
Mostardas was colonized by Azorean immigrants.

In 1738 there was already a military outpost called Guarda das Mustardas (Mostardas Lookout). The name remained until the beginning of the 20th century, when it became known as Mostardas.

On the 18th of January 1773, Mostardas Parish is created. Later it became the district of São José do Norte.

On the 26th of December 1963, the district emancipates itself. On 11 April 1964, Executive, Legislative, and Judiciary branches were established.

Regarding the name Mostardas, there is no documented explanation. One of the hypothesis suggest that the city received its name on account of the large amount of the edible vegetable found in the area (see mustard).

Another hypothesis listed by the historian Marisa Oliveira Guedes is that the name Mustardas was given not by the amount of the plant, which does not actually exist on the fields, but, because Mostardas were the name of the trenches used during the wars in Portugal, which were covered with a mat made of reed and Taquara bamboo, with camouflage made of mustard, because this plant does not wither.

== Geography ==
Situated on 31º 06' 25" latitude south and 50º 55' 16" longitude west, at an altitude of 17 meters. The city is part of the south shore of the state of Rio Grande do Sul, on an isthmus formed by Laguna dos Patos and Atlantic Ocean. Its population, as estimated by the Census of IBGE of 2020 is 12,847 inhabitants.

The climate is humid subtropical.

It has an area of 1.982,992 km^{2}.

It has four beaches. Solitude Beach (northernmost and fartherst one) receives more tourists from other cities, such as the metropolitan region, than Mostardas itself. Balneario Mostardense (closest to the city, only 12 km) is also known as New Beach, has a bus line to downtown. Saint Simon Beach (28 km of Mostardas) hosts one of the city's oldest societies, the Club of Saint Simon, founded in 1948. It still hosts parties, live music, and dinners. The Father John Beach (the smallest one) has inhabitants who have been living there for a long time. It has one of the biggest religious festivals of the city during the summer.

== See also ==
- List of municipalities in Rio Grande do Sul

== Bibliography ==
- Jayme Collares Neto (2017) Histórias Antigas de Mostardas,
