= Polites (son of Priam) =

Mythological Greek character, Trojan prince, son of Priam

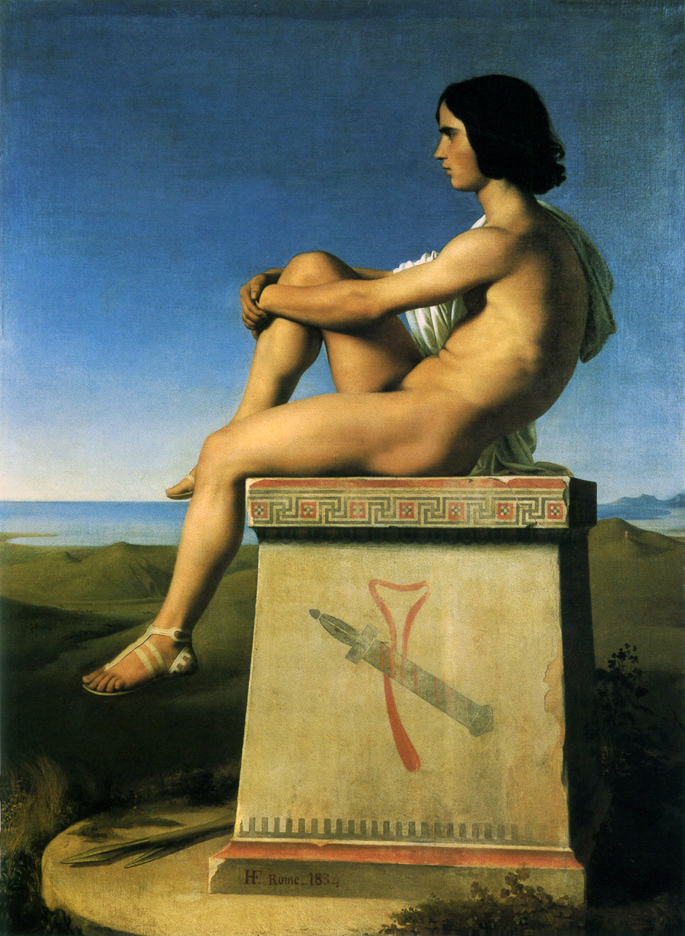
Hippolyte Flandrin, Polites

In Greek mythology, Polites (Ancient Greek: Πολίτης) was the legitimate son of King Priam and Queen Hecuba, known for his swiftness. He was a brother of 49 other children. He was killed by Neoptolemus (Pyrrhus), son of Achilles, who then also killed Polites' father. He is also known by his family as "defender of Troy."

== Mythology ==
Polites was born to Priam, the king of Troy, and his wife Hecuba. During his youth, Polites witnessed the Trojan War and was a supporting character in the Iliad. In that work, he is described as a fast runner, who served as a scout.

In the Iliad, Polites rescues his brother Deiphobus, who is injured, during the Trojan War. During the episode of the Trojan Horse in the Trojan War, Polites was one of those who accepted the gift. During the fall of Troy and the attempted escape to Latium, Neoptolemus shot an arrow in Polites' leg. Polites fell, escaping Neoptolemus, who pursued Polites to his father's palace. Priam called on the gods to punish Neoptolemus, but in that scene, Priam was also killed by Neoptolemus.

The Roman author Cato writes that Polites survived the war and accompanied Aeneas to Italy, where he was the founder of a city, Politorium. In the Aeneid, he fathered a son called Priam. This boy escaped Troy and was present at Anchises' funeral games.

There are no certain representations of Polites in ancient Greek art. Some scholars have interpreted certain works of art as representing Polites, including a volute krater dating to around 570–560 BC.

== Namesake ==
- Asteroid 4867 Polites, named after Polites

== See also ==
- List of children of Priam
