= Alban wine =

Wine of Ancient Rome from Colli Albani

Alban wine is a notable wine of Ancient Rome that was grown in the Colli Albani (Alban Hills) region, 20 kilometres (12 mi) Southeast of Rome, at the foot of Mt. Albus. The area is now occupied by the modern day papal residence of Castelgandolfo. The land was praised by Columella: "For there is no doubt that, of all the vines that the earth sustains, those of the Massic, Surrentine, Alban, and Caecuban lands hold first place in the excellence of their wine" (De re rustica, III.8.5).

Dionysius of Halicarnassus noted the quality of the area's wine as he wrote: "Lying below the city are plains marvelous to behold and rich in producing wines and fruits of all sorts in no degree inferior to the rest of Italy, and particularly what they call the Alban wine, which is sweet and excellent and, with the exception of the Falernian, certainly superior to all others." (Roman Antiquities Book 1).

== Reputation and characteristics ==
In AD 77, Pliny the Elder rated Alban wine third in reputation after Caecuban wine and Falernian wine. (Natural History Book XIV) Pliny described the wines as "extremely sweet and occasionally dry". It was known as one of the preferred wines of the Roman upper class and was commonly made as several varieties-very sweet, sweetish, rough, and sharp. The wine was considered best after aging.

== Horace ==
Alban wine earned several mentions in the work of the Roman poet Horace. It was listed as one of the fine wines served at Nasidienus' dinner party in Satires 2.8. In Satire 4, Horace makes the note that

Venuculan grapes are best when preserved:
Alban are better smoked.

In Ode 4:9, Horace presents as gift to his friend Maecenas, on his birthday, a jar of Alban wine that was over 9 years old.

== See also ==
- Ancient Rome and wine
