= Regional Park of Decima-Malafede =

Coordinates: 41°44′09″N 12°27′39″E

Decima-Malafede Nature Reserve
- Riserva Naturale Decima-Malafede
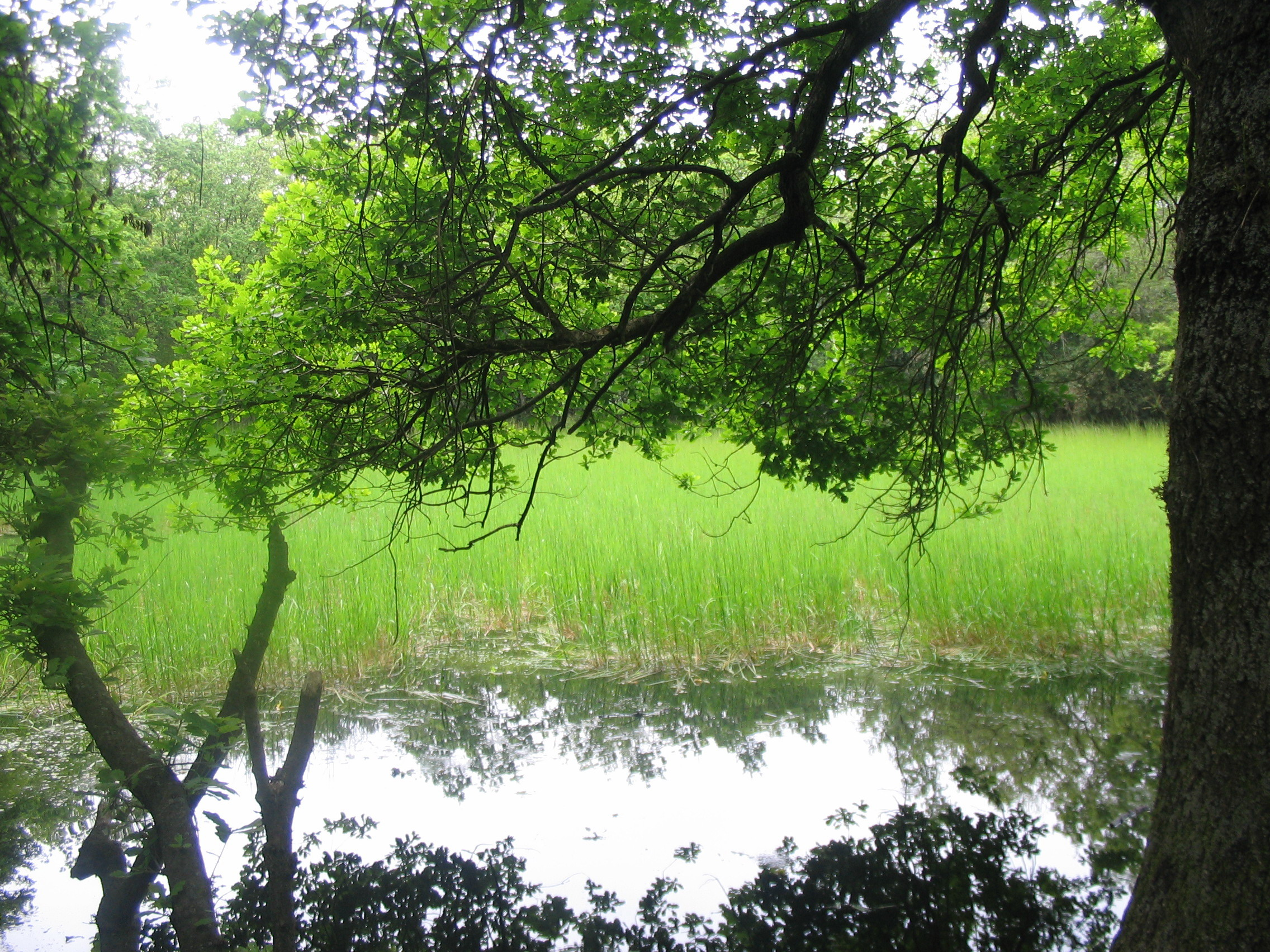

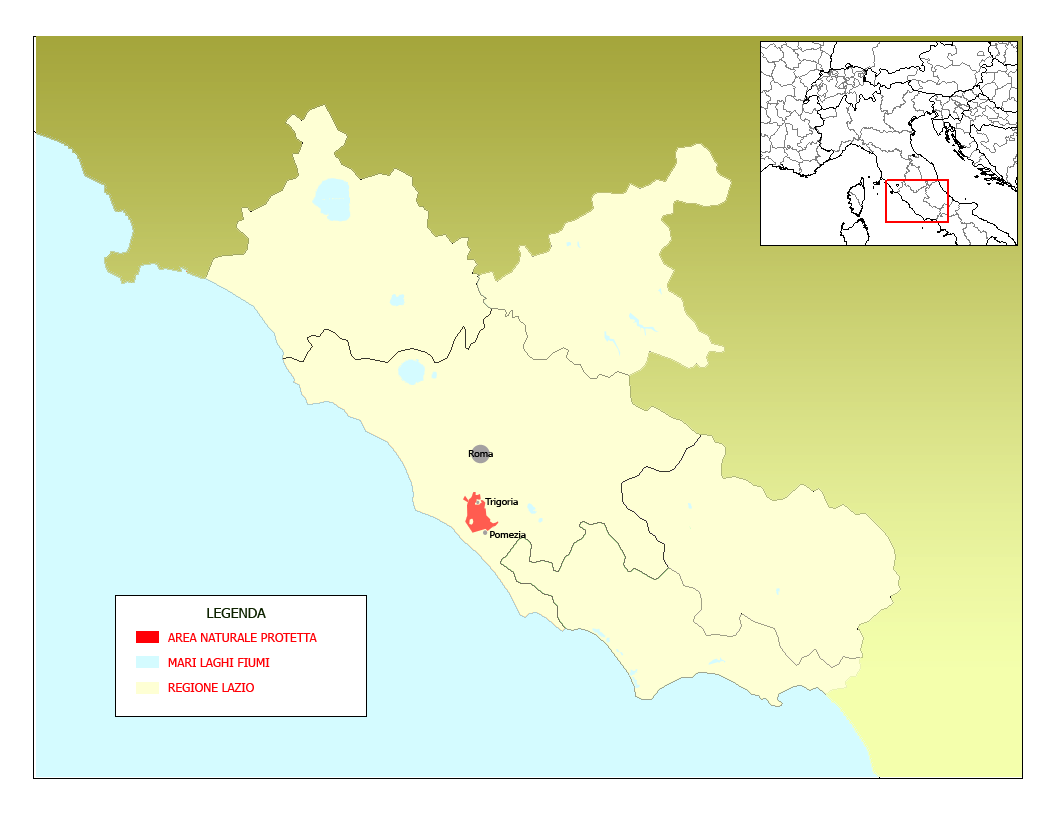
- Map of the Nature Reserve
- Location: Rome, Italy
- Nearest city: Rome
- Area: 61.45 km^{2} (23.73 sq mi)
- Established: 6 October 1997 (Regional Law no. 29)
- Governing body: RomaNatura
- Website: www.romanatura.roma.it/parchi/decima_malafede.php

The Nature Reserve of Decima-Malafede is a protected natural area of Lazio, Italy, entirely included in the territory of the Municipality of Rome. It has an area of approximately 6,145 hectares.

The Reserve was established in 1997.

The park is in the southwest zone of the city of Rome, bounded by the Grande Raccordo Anulare, the Via Pontina, the Via Laurentina and the territory of the Municipality of Pomezia.

The park is notable for its population of wild boars, while sedimentary rocks contain human prehistoric remains.

== See also ==
- Castel di Decima
- Malafede
- Castello di Decima
