= Aprilia, Lazio =

Aprilia
- Comune
- Città di Aprilia
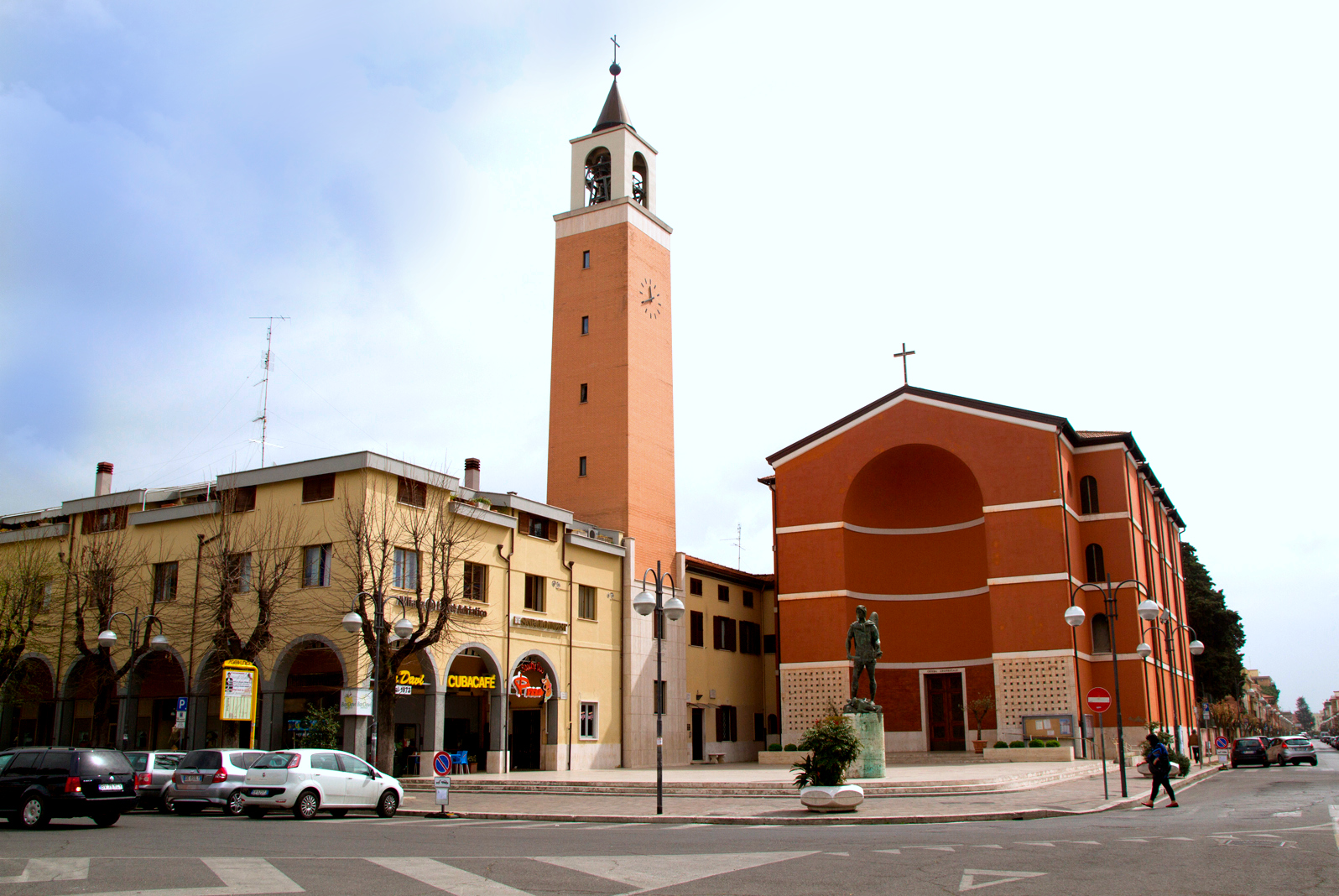
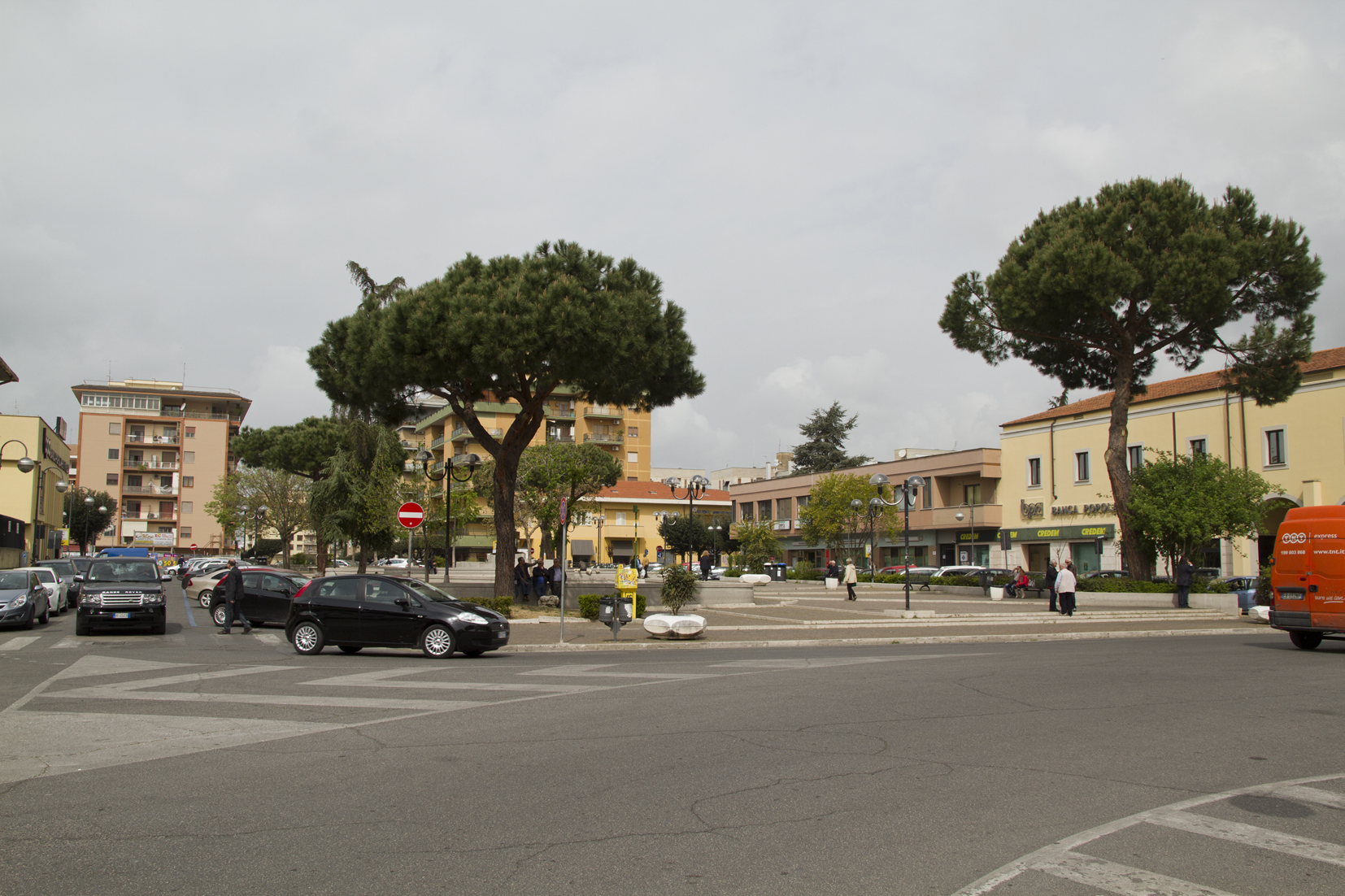
- Saint Michael's Church, Piazza Roma

- Coat of arms

- Location of Aprilia in the Province of Latina

- Location of Aprilia in Italy Aprilia (Lazio)
- Coordinates: 41°35′N 12°39′E
- Country: Italy
- Region: Lazio
- Province: Latina (LT)
- Frazioni: see list

Government
  - Mayor: Lanfranco Principi

Area
  - Total: 177.70 km^{2} (68.61 sq mi)
- Elevation: 80 m (260 ft)

Population (November 30, 2019)
  - Total: 74,977
  - Density: 421.93/km^{2} (1,092.8/sq mi)
- Demonym: Apriliani
- Time zone: UTC+1 (CET)
  - Summer (DST): UTC+2 (CEST)
- Postal code: 04011, 04010
- Dialing code: 06
- Patron saint: St. Michael
- Saint day: September 29
- Website: Official website

Aprilia (Italian: [aˈpriːlja]) is a comune (municipality) in the province of Latina, now incorporated in the conurbation of Rome, in the Italian region of Latium. It is the fifth most populous town in the region and the tenth largest by area.

== Territory ==
Aprilia is located at 80 m (262 ft) above sea level, in the Agro Romano, and is 16 km (10 mi) away from the Anzio and Nettuno seaside towns, 31 km (19 mi) from Rome and 16 km (10 mi) from Colli Albani. Although Aprilia is formally part of the province of Latina, due to its northern position strategically located between the Nettunense and the Pontina at the far north of the Pontinian province, Aprilia is commonly associated with Rome. It has been considered whether Aprilia should switch provinces to be included within the Rome metropolitan area.

== History ==
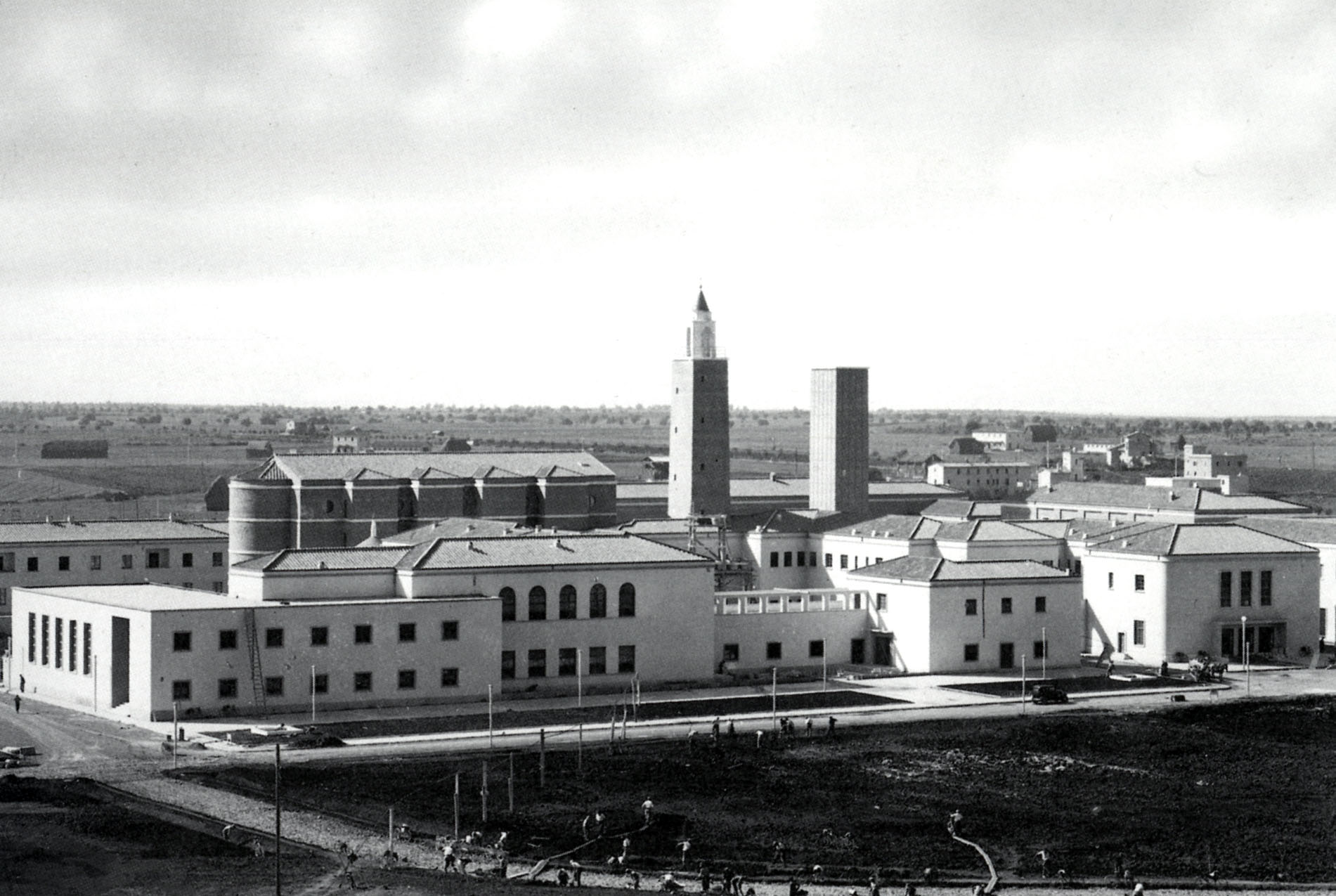
View of Aprilia in 1936.

In ancient times the territory of Aprilia was under the dominion of Ardea and then Rome.

In the modern age Aprilia was founded on April 25, 1936, during the Fascist government's project of land reclamation, wanted by Benito Mussolini, where new areas were proposed for Italian citizens to live and work in not far from the big cities. Aprilia was part of the project called 2PST by Concezio Petrucci, Mario (Mosè) Tufaroli, Emanuele Filiberto Paolini e Riccardo Silenzi. The area where the city was built belonged to the province of Rome, and was the fourth in order of foundation after Littoria, Sabaudia e Pontinia. The name of the city comes from the Latin Venus Aprilia – "Fruitful Venus"

With a surface of 17,774 hectares (43,920 acres) and 71,150 inhabitants as of 31 March 2011, the municipality comprises the city center and the following settlements: Agip, Bellavista, Buon Riposo, Caffarelli, Campo del Fico, Campo di Carne, Campoleone, Campoverde, Carano-Garibaldi, Carroceto, Casalazzara, Fossignano, Gattone, Genio Civile, Giannottola, Guardapasso, Isole, La Gogna, Montarelli, Pantanelle, Pian di Frasso, Rosatelli, Spaccasassi, Torre Bruna, Toscanini, Torre del Padiglione, Tufello, Vallelata, Valli.

In 1929, after repeated attempts, the work of land reclamation in the area began and attracted a significant number of people coming from Trentino, Veneto, from Friuli, and from Emilia Romagna.

At the end of 1931 the real transformation of the land started with deforestation in the whole area, draining of the marsh, and plowing of the land. Houses were built with estates ranging from 4 to 12 hectares (10 to 30 acres). Only then a stable population settled in living for a small part in the new urban center, most of them in rural houses.

At its foundation, the Urban Center was composed of four main buildings: City, post office, church and casa del Fascio, to which were later added Cinema Littorio and the inn.

=== World War II ===
Things became critical with the advance of World War II and the beginning of the Battle of Rome.

In January 1944 Aprilia, called "la fabbrica", "the factory", by the Allies, was reduced to a pile of rubble and the population took refuge in Campania and Calabria.

=== Post-War ===
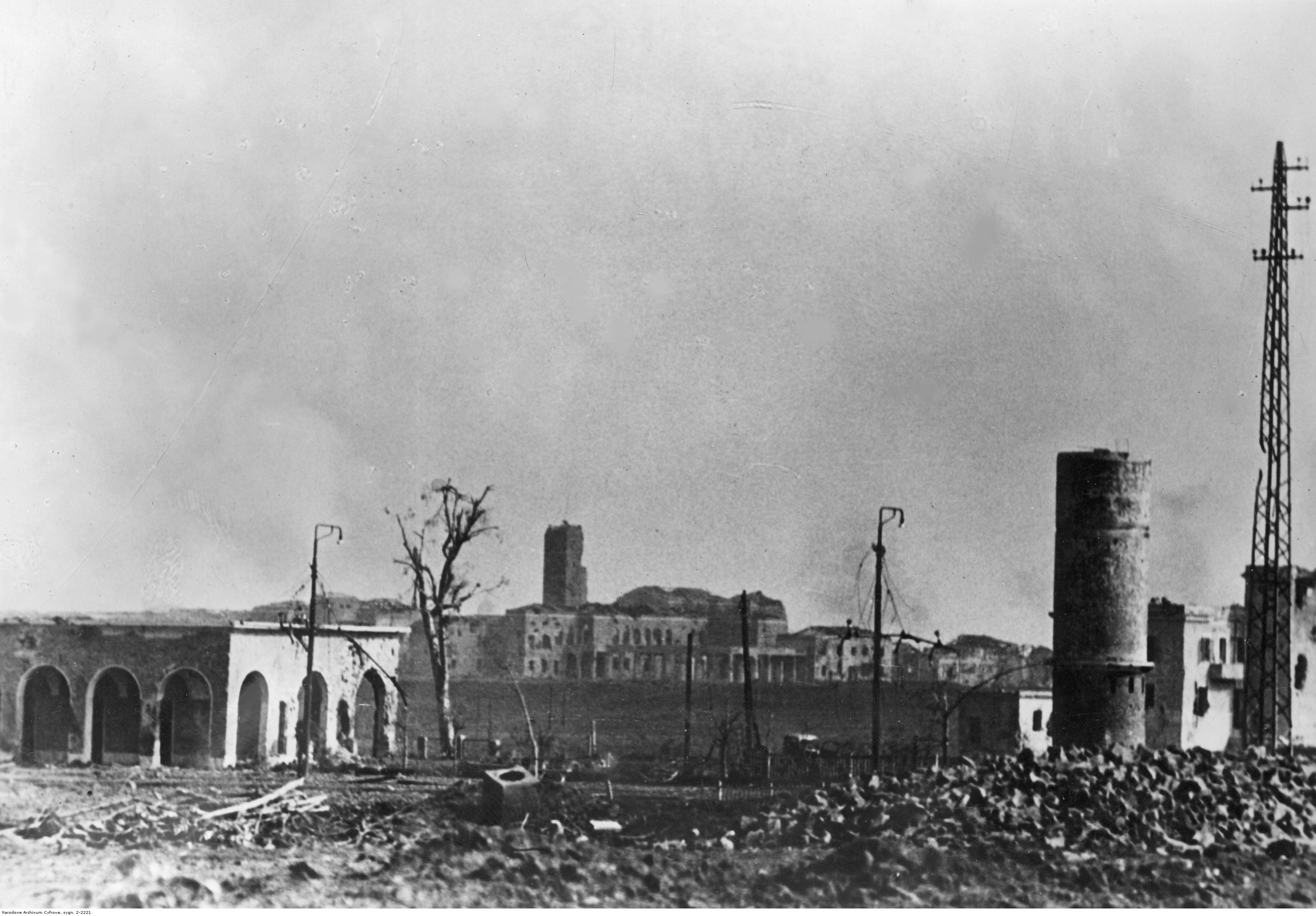
Aprilia reduced to rubble after WWII, 1944.

In the 1950s, Italians from the North African colonies came and planted extensive vineyards to produce wines with Denominazione di origine controllata and some of the best grapes in Italy.

With the establishment of the Cassa per il Mezzogiorno and, subsequently, the Consortium for the area of industrial development in Lazio, the future of Aprilia changed completely: it went from agriculture to a consumer 'market-oriented agriculture, and new and more technically advanced farms emerged. This was the first step toward industrialization itself.

At the end of 1951 Aprilia's first factory was built, the Simmenthal, which was followed by many other national and international workshops. The town changed its face and gave work to many workers. Aprilia currently houses about one hundred plants, including some major corporations.

On April 26, 1996, Aprilia became the sister city of Mostardas, a town of Rio Grande do Sul, Brazil, where the national hero Menotti Garibaldi was born, and whose remains rest in Aprilia after some parts of the neighbouring town Velletri switched to Aprilia in the same year.

The rebuilt Aprilia economy was based on small local trade and sheep grazing. Subsequently, the minefields were cleared, and the sowing of cereals and the breeding of working cattle went back. At the end of the conflicts, starting from the 1950s, the territory of Aprilia experienced a phenomenon of growth in economic and population terms. During this period, Italian refugees arrived from North Africa who planted vast vineyards for the production of controlled denomination of origin wines and table grapes among the best in Italy.

With the establishment of the Cassa per il Mezzogiorno and, subsequently, of the Consortium for the industrial development area of Lazio, the future of Aprilia changed totally: it went from consumer agriculture to market agriculture and new ones were created. technically more advanced farms. This was the first step towards true industrialization. At the end of 1951, the first industrial plant, Simmenthal, took up residence in the Aprilia area, followed by many other national and international factories. The town changed its face and offered work to numerous workers. Currently around 100 plants operate in Aprilia, including some important multinationals.

Since the 1950s, several cases of infiltration by members of organized crime, both from the 'Ndrangheta and the Camorra, have been active in Aprilia, active not only in illicit activities but also in construction-related activities.

Today the city center presents itself in a significantly different way. The current appearance is due to the demolition of the Casa del Fascio in the seventies, the reconstruction of the Town Hall, the partial modifications of all the other buildings, restored after the war and the recent reconstruction of the bell tower of the Church of S. Michele Arcangelo occurred in 1999.

On October 29, 2012, by decree of the President of the Republic, Aprilia was awarded the title of City.

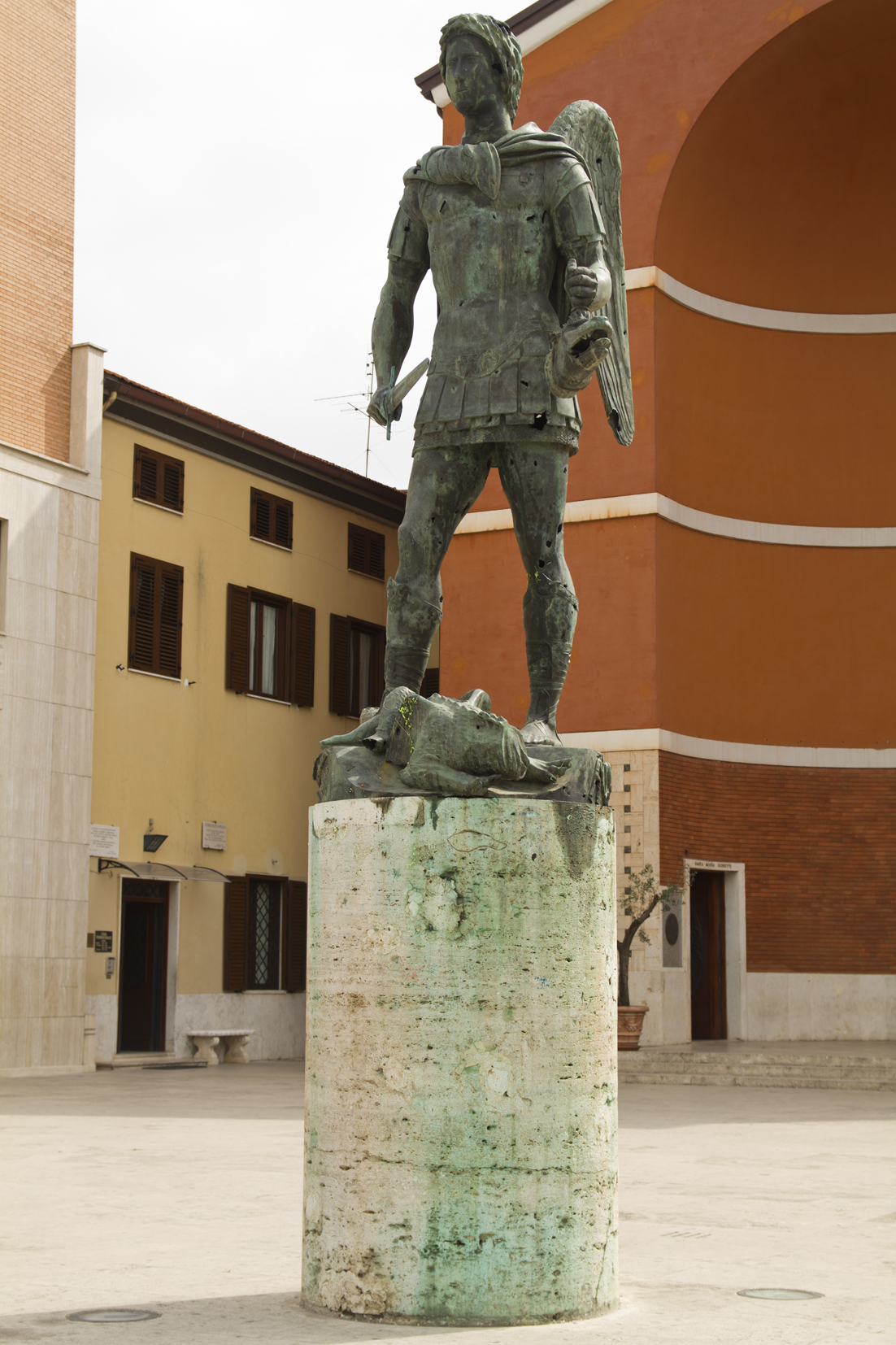
Statue of St. Michael Archangel, by the sculptor Venanzo Crocetti donated in 1936

== Geography ==
=== Frazioni ===
Agip, Bellavista, Buon Riposo, Caffarelli, Campo del Fico, Campo di Carne, Campoleone, Campoverde, Carano – Garibaldi, Carroceto, Casalazzara, Fossignano, Gattone, Genio Civile, Giannottola, Guardapasso, Isole, La Cogna, Montarelli, Pantanelle, Pian di Frasso, Rosatelli, Spaccasassi, Torre Bruna, Toscanini, Torre del Padiglione, Tufello, Vallelata, Valli.

== Demographics ==
Historical population

Year	Pop.	±%
1861	-	—
1871	413	—
1881	533	+29.1%
1901	821	+54.0%
1911	1,009	+22.9%
1921	1,284	+27.3%
1931	1,810	+41.0%
1936	2,237	+23.6%

Year	Pop.	±%
1951	6,943	+210.4%
1961	15,782	+127.3%
1971	28,349	+79.6%
1981	37,807	+33.4%
1991	47,037	+24.4%
2001	56,028	+19.1%
2011	66,979	+19.5%
2021	74,119	+10.7%

Source: ISTAT

== Aprilia DOC ==
The Aprilia region is home to a 3,700-hectare (9,100-acre) Denominazione di origine controllata DOC that is noted for its varietal wines from varieties such as Trebbiano, Merlot, Sangiovese and Abbuoto. Under DOC regulations, the wine must be labeled correctly for the grape variety to qualify for the DOC designation. Nearly 75% of the DOC production is centered around Trebbiano.

Additional DOC requirements include:

- Merlot and Trebbiano grapes must be harvested to a yield no greater than 15 tonnes per hectare with the finished wine needing to attain a minimum alcohol level of at least 11%
- Sangiovese have a maximum yield restriction of 14 t/ha with the finished wine needing at least 11.5% alcohol by volume.

== Coat of arms ==
The coat of arms represents a field of sky with five black swallows on the fly unfolded, in the formation of an inverted wedge.

== Honors ==
Medaglia di bronzo al Merito Civile

The City of Aprilia received an honor on February 8, 2001.

Located in a strategic position, during the last world war it was the scene of fierce battles between the two armies that competed for its occupation. Despite the enormous damage to the inhabited area and to the infrastructures, the population endured the enormous inconveniences with a great spirit of sacrifice and worked tirelessly in the difficult reconstruction work.

— Aprilia (LT), January–June 1944

Aprilia was in fact the site of episodes of civil resistance.

== Monuments ==
=== Religious Architecture ===
St. Michael's and Maria Goretti's Churches

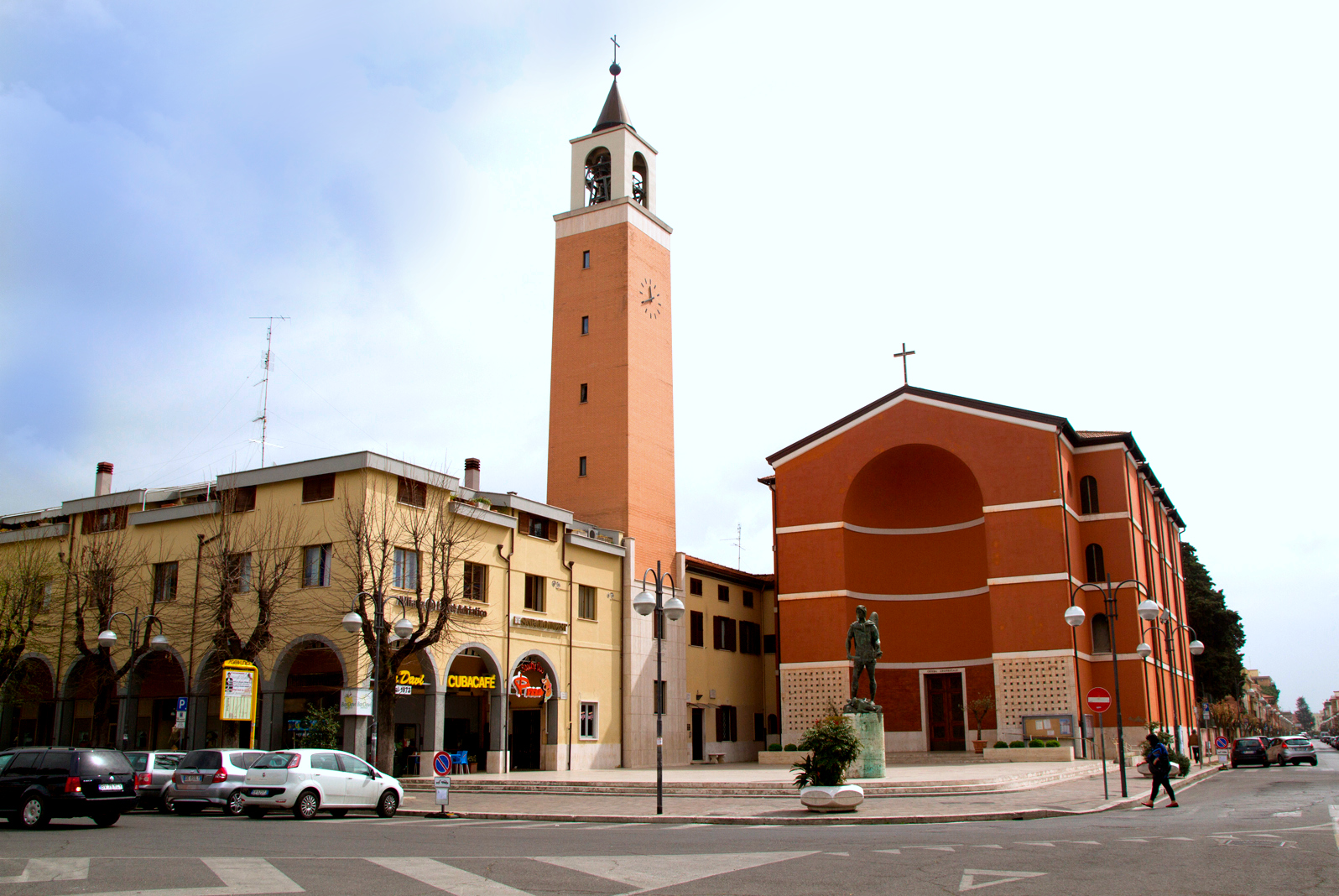
Saint Michael's Church 1936.

The church was one of the first buildings built in the city, and was partially destroyed during the last world war. In 1952 the original dedication to St. Michael was added to St. Maria Goretti

St.Michael Archangel Statue

In the city centre of Aprilia, in the churchyard, stands the statue of the patron saint of the city "San Michele Arcangelo", on which the historical wounds caused by the battle between Italo-Germans and Allies are still visible during the last world conflict.

=== Civil Architecture ===
==== Mausoleum of the Garibaldi family Mausoleo della famiglia Garibaldi ====
In the hamlet of Carano there is the mausoleum where the remains of seventeen members of the Garibaldi family rest.

In the family crypt is also buried Menotti Garibaldi, son of Anita and Giuseppe Garibaldi, who lived in that place for several years until his death in Rome in 1903.

On March 31, 2011 the tomb was profaned by some vandals. However, once the sarcophagus and the wooden chest containing Menotti's remains were uncovered, the intruders were unable to remove anything.

=== Other ===
==== World War II – Monument to the Fallen ====
In Piazza della Repubblica there is a work created by the artist Luigi Gheno on a project by the architect Marcello De Rossi. The bronze and concrete stele was inaugurated on May 1, 1960, erected in honor of the fallen of all wars.

==== Monument to the fallen of the Battle of Anzio ====
The monument, an obelisk located in via Carroceto, was inaugurated on February 18, 2014 and commemorates the fallen allies of the Battle of Anzio who remained without burial.

The inauguration ceremony was attended by Roger Waters, former founder, singer and bassist of Pink Floyd, whose father (second lieutenant Eric Fletcher Waters) died during the landing, precisely on February 18, 1944, and whose remains have never been found.

For the first time Roger Waters visited Aprilia to see the exact place where his father lost his life, placing a wreath at the base of the monument.

The obelisk bears the Italian translation of some lines of a song composed by Roger Waters himself for Pink Floyd:

Cenere e diamanti / nemico e amico / eravamo tutti uguali alla fine

— Pink Floyd, "Two Suns in the Sunset", from the album The Final Cut (1983), Ashes and diamonds / foe and friend / we were all equal in the end

== Twin towns – sister cities ==
Aprilia is twinned with:

- Mostardas, Brazil (1996)
- Buja, Italy (1997)
- Montorio al Vomano, Italy (2000)
- Sciacca, Italy (2003)
- Ben Arous, Tunisia (2003)
- Tulcea, Romania (2003)
- Cingoli, Italy (2004)
