= Bertha Tilly =

Bertha Tilly (1900–1980) was a 20th-century British classical philologist, topographer, and educator born in Lancaster. She is best remembered for her editions and works on Virgil, and her work in the field of topography.

== Biography ==
Tilly was born in Lancaster in 1900, and obtained her degree and PhD from the University of London. She worked as a teacher, and, later, headmistress, combining work as a secondary school educator with her research career in London and Ely, before retiring to Cambridge. After her death in 1980, her considerable library and photographic collection were left to the Institute of Classical Studies in London.

== Works ==
One of Tilly's notable works is Vergil's Latium (1947), a series of topographical studies of the Roman Campagna. Tilly discusses locations in relation to Virgil's Aeneid, the last six books of which are set there. By compiling historical, archaeological, and topographical material, Tilly reconstructs the area as it was in Virgil's day. Ursula Le Guin commented on the influence of Tilly's book on her novel Lavinia.

Another important work by Tilly is her 1973 edition of Varro, titled Varro the Farmer: A Selection from the Res Rusticae, which was praised by her contemporaries. Tilly also created several editions of Virgil for use of the classroom, all of which were generally well received.
