= Ficana =

Human settlement in Italy

Ficana was an ancient city of Latium, which figures in Roman history only on the occasion of its conquest by Ancus Marcius, who is said to have moved the inhabitants to Rome, and destroyed the city itself. (Livy i. 33; Dionys. iii. 38, where the editions have Fidenae, but there is little doubt that the event referred to is the same related by Livy.) It is certain that it was never repeopled: its name is found in Pliny's list of the extinct cities of Latium (iii. 5. s. 9), and is noticed also by Festus (v. Puilia Saxa) as a place no longer in existence. The latter passage, however, affords us a clue to its position; according to Marcus Antistius Labeo there cited, it was situated on the Via Ostiensis, eleven miles from Rome, and apparently immediately adjoining the Tiber, on which it had a port, at a place called by Fabius Pictor the Puilia Saxa. The city's site is in the commune of Rome near Acilia, on the via Ostiense between Rome and Ostia.
