= Politorium =

Town in ancient Latium, Italy

Politorium was a town in ancient Latium, Italy.

In the early semi-legendary history of Rome, Politorium was one of a number of towns of the Latins who went to war with ancient Rome in the 7th century BC, during the reign of the Roman King Ancus Marcius. The Romans' first move in the war was to march on Politorium and to take it by force. The citizens of Politorium were removed to settle on the Aventine Hill in Rome as new citizens, following the Roman traditions from wars with the Sabines and Albans. When the other Latins subsequently occupied the empty town of Politorium, Ancus took the town again and demolished it.

Pliny the Elder, writing in the 1st century AD describes Politorium as one of a number of former Latin peoples that have disappeared without trace. Cato the Elder attributes the town's founding to Polites, a son of Priam in Greek mythology.

The site of ancient Politorium has been identified as being the town of La Giostra on the Via Appia, La Torretta near Decimo on the Via Larrentina or Castel di Decima.
