= Amyclae (Italy) =

Greek city of Magna Graecia

Coordinates: 41°N 13°E

Amyclae or Amyclanus was a Greek city of Magna Graecia on the coast of Latium (some authors say Campania), between Tarracina and Caieta, which had ceased to exist in the time of Pliny, but had left the name of Sinus Amyclanus to the part of the coast on which it was situated. Its foundation was ascribed to a band of Laconians who had emigrated from the city of the same name near Sparta; and a strange story is told by Pliny and Servius of the inhabitants having been compelled to abandon it by the swarms of serpents with which they were infested.

Other writers refer to this city the legend commonly related of the destruction of the Laconian Amyclae, in consequence of the silence of its inhabitants; and the epithet applied to it by Virgil of tacitae Amyclae appears to favour this view. The exact site is unknown, but it must have been close to the marshes below Fundi; whence Martial terms it "Amyclae Fundanae". In the immediate neighbourhood, but on a rocky promontory projecting into the sea, was a villa of Tiberius, called Spelunca, from the natural caverns in the rock, in one of which the emperor nearly lost his life by the falling in of the roof, while he was supping there with a party of friends. The ancient name of the locality is retained, with little variation, by the modern village of Sperlonga, about 8 miles (13 km) west of Gaeta, where the grottoes in the rock are still visible, with some remains of their ancient architectural decorations.
