= Latial culture =

Iron Age culture in central Italy

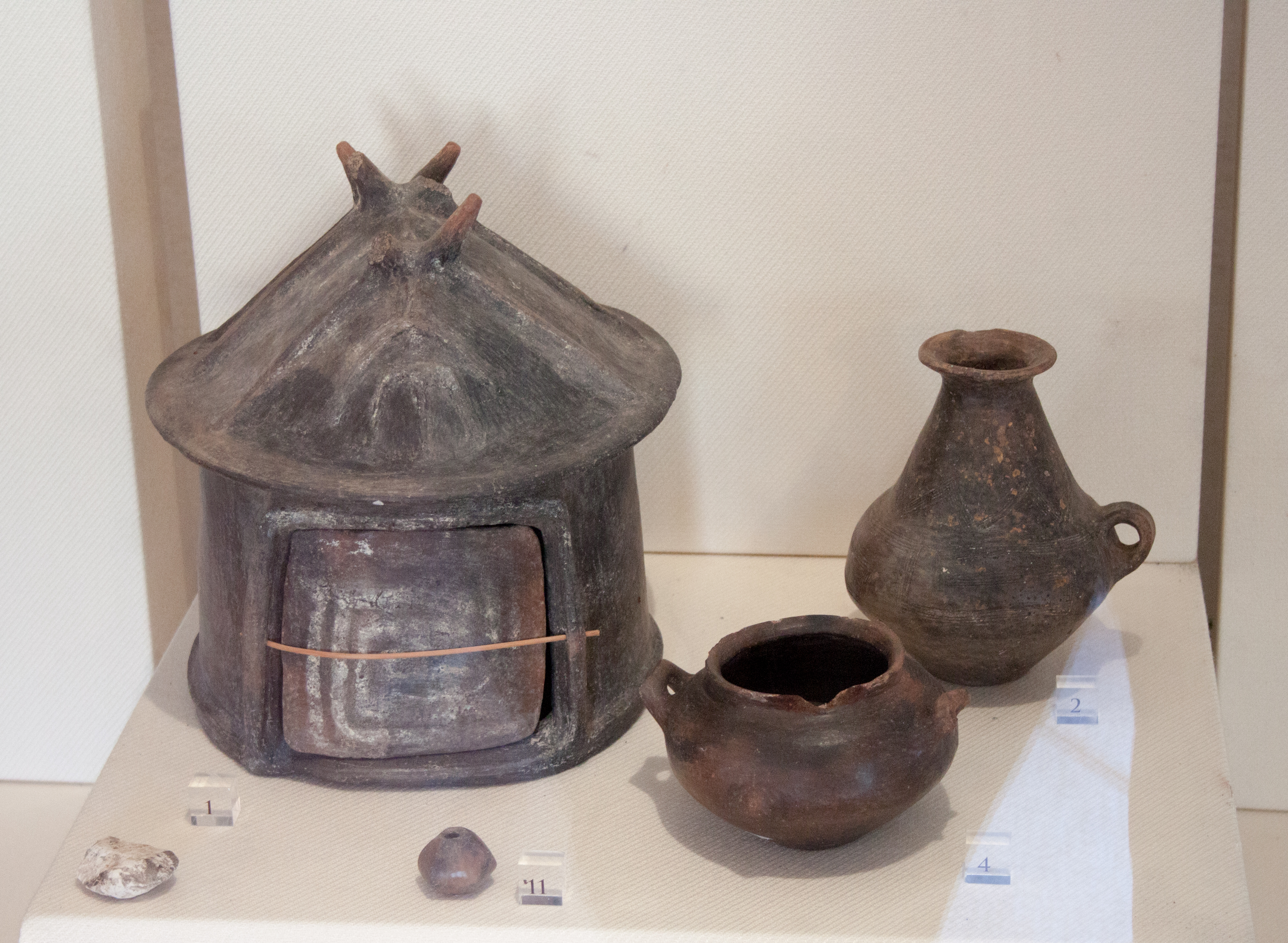
- Hut urn and pottery, Museo Nazionale Romano
- Geographical range: Central Italy: Latium
- Period: Early Iron Age
- Dates: c. 900 BCE – c. 700 BCE
- Preceded by: Proto-Villanovan culture, Urnfield culture, Apennine culture
- Followed by: Roman Kingdom

The Latial culture (c. 900–700 BCE) was an Iron Age culture of central Latium, in central Italy, associated with the proto-Latin population, ranged approximately over ancient Old Latium. The Apennine culture of Latium transitioned smoothly into the Latial with no evidence of an intrusive population movement. The population generally abandoned sites of purely economic advantage in favor of defensible sites which later became cities. The term pre-urban is used for this era. The population movement to more defensible sites may indicate an increase in marauding. The Iron Age Latial culture is associated with the processes of formation of the Latins, the culture was likely therefore to represent a phase of the socio-political self-consciousness of the Latin tribe, during the period of the kings of Alba Longa and the foundation of the Roman Kingdom.

Latial culture is identified by their hut-shaped burial urns. Urns of the Proto-Villanovan culture are plain and biconical and were buried in a deep shaft. The hut urn is a round or square model of a hut with a peaked roof. The interior is accessed by a door on one of its sides. Cremation was practiced as well as burial. The style is distinctive. The hut urns were miniature versions of the huts in which the population lived, although during this period they also developed the use of stone for temples and other public buildings.

== Chronology ==
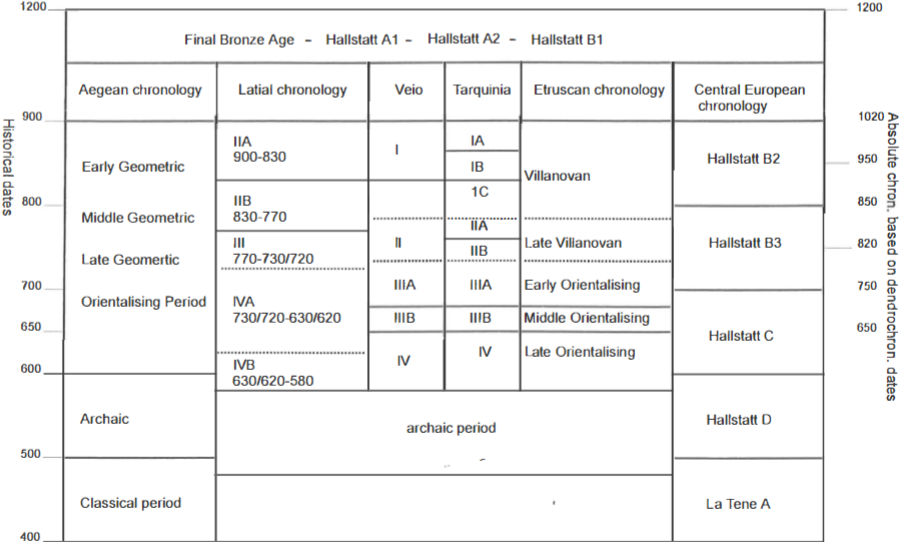
The chronology of the Latial culture alongside various contemporaneous Iron or Bronze Ages cultures.

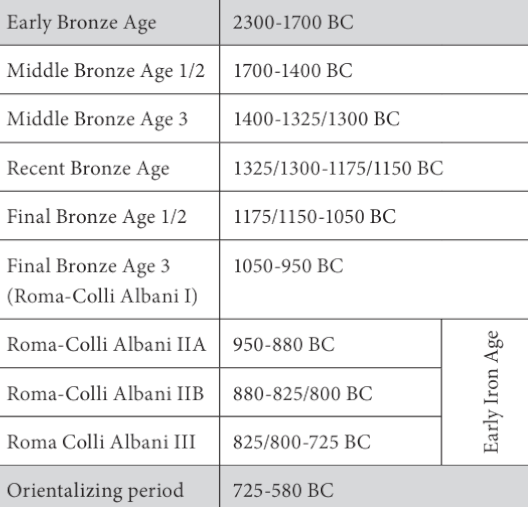
Latial chronology according to the Italian archaeologist Luca Alessandri.

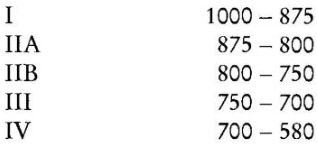
Rendition of Latial chronology by R. Ross Holloway.

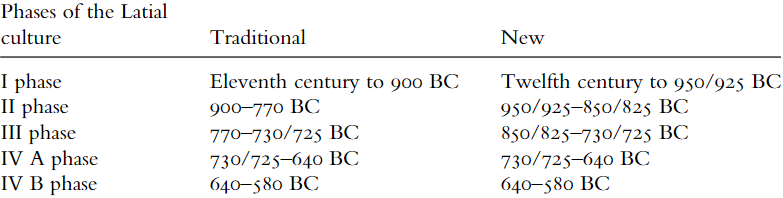
Account of the modern and traditional chronologies of Latial society by Gabriele Cifani.

Giovanni Pinza, an Italian archaeologist, initially identified two periods based upon the material culture of the tombs in the Esquiline or the Forum. The first period—which corresponds to Latial I-III—was marked by the lack of Greek imports or light-ground pottery. Conversely, the second period—which corresponds to Latial IVA-IVB—was defined by the presence of such goods. Later work building upon Pinza's research identified further periods of Latial history, most of which were defined based upon changes in Latial pottery styles. The standard periodization based on pottery is accepted as standard with little variation; however, a tolerance of ±25 years is implied.

The archaeologist Einar Gjerstad argued that pottery typology can be an unreliable source for establishing chronology, as—according to Gjerstad—attempts to catalogue the standard styles of a particular period excessively simplify the smaller-scale variations in technique between different workshops and craftsmen, who will naturally develop their own personalized art styles that combine individual input with inspiration from preceding periods. More recent work based on dendrochronology has indicated a need to revise some periodization, with preserved timbers indicating that the traditional chronology may be some fifty years later out of sync with the rest of Europe; this raises some difficulty inasmuch as the timbers' dates disagree with pottery's dates.

The first period of the Latial culture corresponds with the remains of the Proto-Villanovan culture, which is itself dated to around 1200-900 BCE. Based purely upon material culture, the first period of Latial society is distinguished by the usage of undecorated pottery, the appearance of the hut urn, and the predilection for cremation burials. Utilizing a set of such cremation burials from Rome, the approximate time period of the first Latial period can be carbon dated to the 11th-10th centuries BCE. From Latial I–II, inhumation gradually replaced cremation as the main funerary rite.

Carbon dating of period II inhumation burials from Rome suggests that the second Latial period dates from the 10th-9th centuries BCE. Most of the graves from the cemetery of Gabii can be assigned to the Latial culture IIA1 and IIB2 based on their grave goods and, moreover, carbon dating suggests that they belonged to the 9th-century BCE. Period II is characterized by the usage of simple patterns to decorate pottery and the presence of thickened bow fibulae within female burials. The distinction between Latial periods IIA and IIB was initially postulated by the German archaeologist Hermann Müller-Karpe on the basis of differences in pottery typology between the Esquiline and the Forum necropolises during period II. Karpe argued that they likely belonged to separate periods of Latial history and, consequently, distinct stages of Latial pottery style. Alternatively, the discrepancies in pottery production may reflect the various techniques of different, albeit contemporary, workshops.

The second and third periods corresponds with the Villanovan culture in Etruria. According to the archeologist R. Ross Holloway, period II in the chronology of Veii likely is contemporaneous with period III in Latial chronology, as both succeed the Proto-Villanovan culture. Holloway proposes that, given numerous pottery artifacts from Veii date to after 750 BCE, the end of Latial IIB and the beginning of period III can also be estimated to have occurred around 750. However, this chronological assessment is contradicted by the results of the carbon dating samples from the hut at Fidene. The material culture of this hut prompts an identification with the end of the Latial period IIB or the beginning of period III, although the results of carbon dating indicate that it could not be dated after 820 BCE. Additional evidence from Satricum corroborates the dating of the early Latial III period to late 9th and early 8th centuries BCE. Two huts at the site which include pottery generally associated with the Latial period III also both contain charcoal samples that—based on carbon dating—allow the assignment of one hut to the 9th-century BCE and another hut to the period between 830-790 BCE.

Period	Date BC (Cornell)	Date BC (Lomas)	Phase
Latial I	1000-900	1085–1020	Pre-urban (Late Bronze Age)
Latial IIA	900-830	1020–950	Pre-urban (Early Iron Age)
Latial IIB	830-770	950–880	Proto-urban (Early Iron Age)
Latial III	770-730	880–750	Proto-urban (Early Iron Age)
Latial IVA	730-630		Proto-urban (Early and middle orientalizing)
Latial IVB	630-580		Archaic urban (Late orientalizing)

== Urbanization ==
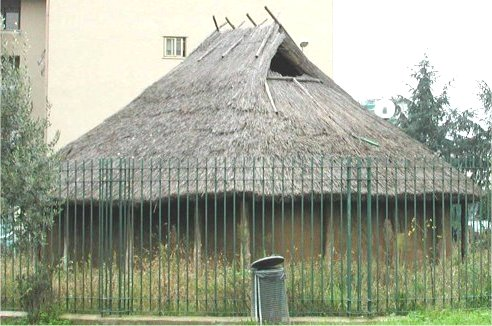
Reconstruction of an Iron Age hut in Fidenae

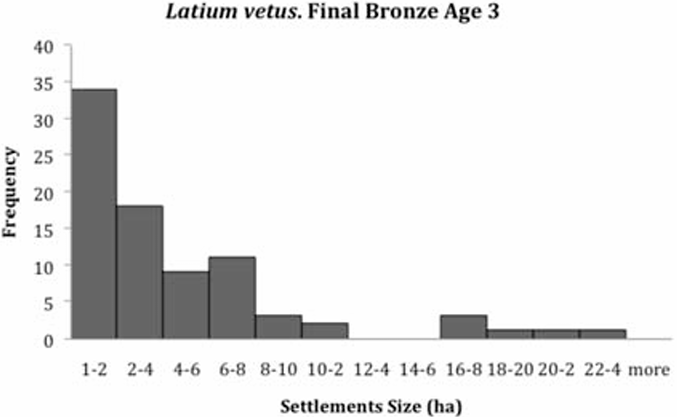
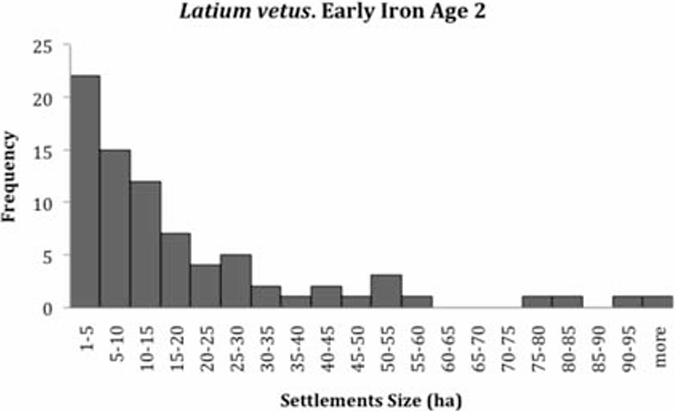
Size of Latial settlements across the Bronze Age and the Early Iron Age

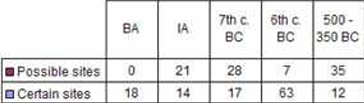
Number of possibly and certainly occupied sites in the Nettuno area. The high number of possibly occupied sites likely stems from insufficient data.

=== Proto-urban cities ===
Little of the architecture of ancient Latium remains, as the construction materials utilized during this period—rammed earth, mud bricks, lumber—were vulnerable to decay. Surviving material from Latial houses during periods I and II indicate a lack of masonry techniques; instead, oval wattle and daub huts with diameters rarely greater than 20 feet (6.1 m) with thatched roofs were common. The early Latial period is characterized by small villages, typically located on hilltops or open plains, with populations likely less than a few hundred. From around 650 BCE onwards, masonry on stone foundations with tiled roofing began to appear in central Italy, although, shortly after this development—in certain areas—older huts continued to exist alongside newer stone structures. According to Potts, the architectural and technological development in Latium was at least partially influenced by migrant Greek architects and craftsmen, who may have been specifically enticed to immigrate by Latial aristocrats seeking to emulate the culture of the Greek world.

Hilltop sites may have been chosen as they were conducive to birdwatching, or augury, an important religious practice in ancient Rome. Sites such as the Temple of Jupiter Optimus Maximus in Rome, which is built atop the Capitoline Hill, and the—potentially sacred—hut at Satricum, which is built atop a hill at its settlement, may indicate that these hilltop areas possessed religious connotations. It is possible that these ancient cultural notions are reflected in the works of Vitruvius, a 1st-century BCE Roman architect who recommends that—in cities believed to operate under the protection of a certain deity or collection of deities—the "sacred buildings" of the aforementioned divine beings ought to be placed at the highest point in the local area, so that the temple may overlook the entire settlement. However, the archaeologist Charlotte R. Potts argues that the distribution of later cult sites reveals no correlation with hilltops. Instead, Potts proposes that cult sites may have been established in these areas to serve the local population, which had chosen to settle on hilltop spaces due to the defensive advantages that elevated areas offer. Afterwards, these sites may have then been retroactively assigned greater sociocultural prominence on account of their antiquity.

During the Bronze Age, numerous communities formed around the Alban Hills, likely due to the extreme fertility of the soil and the multitude of streams in the area, which provided convenient sources of water. Based on this trend, it has been presumed that the Alban Hills may have functioned as the center of urbanization in Old Latium during the Bronze Age. According to the archaeologist Daniele Maras, the importance of the Alban Hills within early Latial history may be reflected in the later Roman religion, in which the Alban Mountain served as the site of the Feriae Latinae ("Latin Festival") and a temple to Jupiter Latarius. Furthermore, the archaeologist Timothy Cornell argues that these customs provide evidence for the existence of a shared Latin ethnic identity since "the earliest times."

Over the course of the Middle Bronze Age, 86% of settlements within the vicinity of Rome were abandoned. In the ensuing Early Iron Age, within the same region, 78% of settlements were newly formed within the era. Based on this data, Fulminante concludes that there must have been a radical shift in Latial settlement organization around this period. Beginning in the 10th-9th centuries BCE, the first proto-urban centers began to form in Latium. The traditional framework for conceptualizing urbanization in central Italy maintains that Etruria underwent an abrupt shift towards proto-urban settlements whereas Latium adopted proto-urban sites more slowly. However, this trend was not uniform across either Latium or Etruria. For instance, it is likely that the two Bronze Age settlements on the Palatine and the Capitoline had already coalesced into a single proto-urban city by the Iron Age, at the same time when most other Latial communities had only begun the process of urbanization. Fulminante argues that the traditional view likely only holds true in a broad sense, although it does not fully account for the nuances of each settlement's individual development.

Proto-urban centers near-unilaterally developed around large naturally defensible plateau areas with steep slopes characterized by fertile soil and access to roads or rivers. Typically, the plateaus were situated near acropolises that had previously been inhabited during the Bronze Age. From periods IIIA-IIIB, the plateau areas became increasingly densely populated, while the surrounding communities were abandoned. Fulminante interprets this trend as evidence of the development of perceived territorial boundaries for proto-urban sites, which became more officially marked by the creation of fortifications around the settlement. Multiplicatively weighted Voronoi diagrams may provide further evidence for the creation of increasingly defined territorial boundaries around proto-urban centers during the second half of the 10th-century BCE. Analysis utilizing such diagrams performed by Fulminante showcases that sites such as Praeneste, Alba Longa, and Satricum had all emerged as proto-urban settlements by this time period. During the Early Iron Age, in the Nettuno area, a phenomenon of "rural infill" occurred in which smaller farmsteads or hamlets emerged that were situated near, and likely fell under the authority of, the proto-urban cities.

=== Spatial Efficiency Model ===
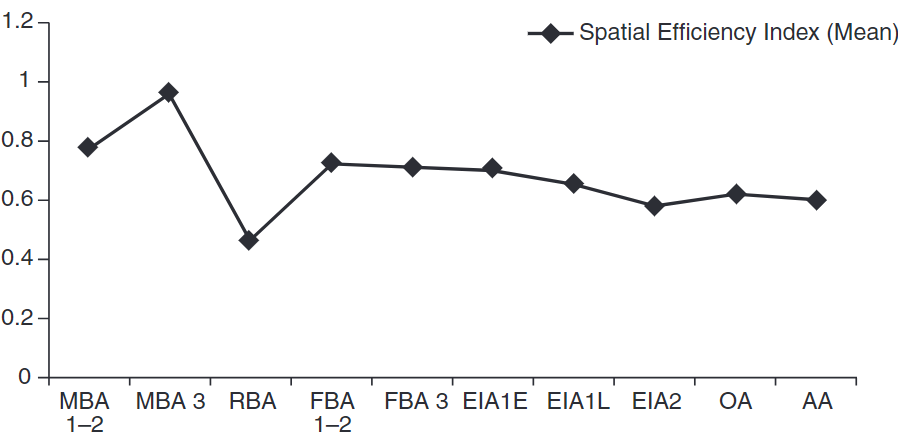
The mean spatial efficiency value of Latium Vetus from the Middle Bronze Age to the Archaic Age.

The distribution of Bronze Age Latial settlements may abide by the Spatial Efficiency Model, a system developed by the anthropologist Vincas P. Steponaitis to mathematically chart the organization of pre-capitalist chiefly societies. Steponaitis argued that, within market-less chiefdoms, interaction between towns is typically indirect, with resources passing from the villages at the bottom of the settlement hierarchy through the mid-level communities before finally reaching the highest-level settlements. In contrast, within market societies individuals may directly visit any other settlement for the purpose of purchasing materials. Consequently, Steponaitis proposes that chiefly societies optimally consist of sets of smaller towns centered around minor centers that are themselves centered around one larger primary settlement. This pattern, according to Steponaitis, facilitates easy communication between a settlement and its immediate lower-order settlements.

Plotting the spatial efficiency data, as calculated by Fulminante, reveals higher mean values for the Final Bronze, which may indicate that Latial society, at this time, was closer to a chiefdom-style organization. The mean spatial efficiency values steadily decreased throughout the Iron Age, perhaps reflecting a pattern of increasing settlement integration. The classical archaeologist Marcello Mogetta contests this conclusion, arguing that the data—which actually reveals a decreasing level of spatial efficiency during the Recent Bronze Age—is insufficient to support the existence of any sort of chiefdom-style society in Late Bronze Age Latium. Moreover, the trendline remains relatively constant from the Early Iron Age until the Archaic Age, thereby contradicting any notion of a changing state that could be derived from a spatial efficiency analysis.

=== Rank-Size model ===
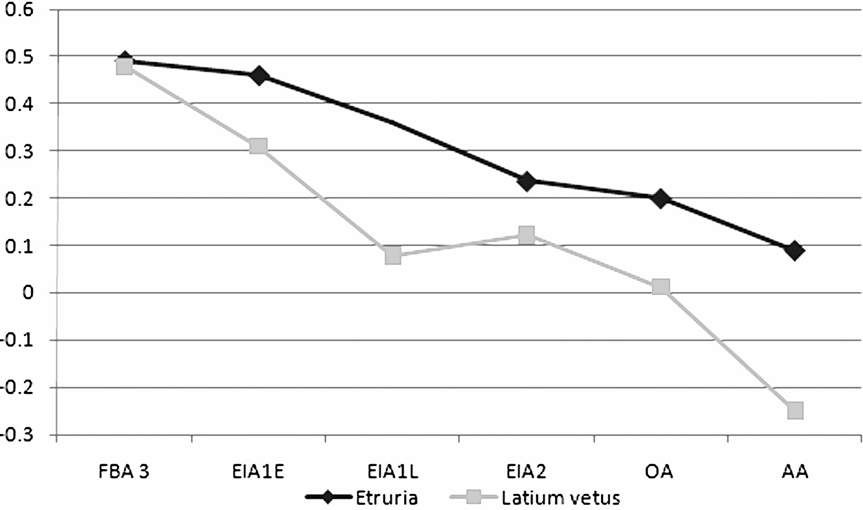
Urban development in Latium Vetus and Etruria according to the Rank-Size model.

The archaeologist Alessandro Guidi attempted to analyze Latial urbanization utilizing the Rank-Size model, an empirical system premised upon Zipf's Law that examines the connection between the size and the rank of a settlement. The model obeys the formula P_{n}=(P1/n) where P_{n} represents the population of a community according to its rank n and P1 represents the population of the largest town. In other words, the equation states that the population of a given town is equivalent to the population of the largest settlement divided by its rank. However, the efficacy of the model is hampered by the difficulty of acquiring precise data regarding the necessary variables for Latial towns. Consequently, Guidi could—at most—calculate the size of the local acropolis for 10th-century BCE sites, although Guidi could—in certain circumstances—calculate the size of the entire region for 9th-8th century BCE sites. Moreover, Guidi discounts sites with unmeasurable sizes, which includes most seaside towns and settlements situated within plains. Guidi, however, considers their exclusion negligible as the majority of these sites—according to Guidi—were too small to significantly affect the data or to pass the minimum size threshold required for designation as a settlement.

Nevertheless, plotting the common logarithms of this data reveals—during the Bronze Age—a convex distribution, although—beginning during period II—the graph trends towards lognormality. Guidi compares these results to the research of the anthropologist Gregory Johnson, who noted a correlation between the convexity of rank-size graphs and low settlement integration (i.e. societies characterized by disparate, somewhat autonomous settlements with little economic ties) among various other eras of history, such as the early Aztec civilization (c. 1350) or the Early Dynastic III period in Mesopotamia (c. 2800 BCE). Classicist Adam Ziółkowski doubts the reliability of such a comparison, noting that the metrics provided by Johnson were designed for entirely distinct cultures and time periods, and are henceforth not necessarily comparable to Old Latium. Regardless, Fulminante, citing the same trend as Guidi, argues that the decreasing convexity of the graph implies a shift from a settlement dynamic defined by low-integration during the Bronze Age to a system marked by high-integration over the course of the Iron Age.

Although the Rank-Size analysis implies a system of generally low settlement integration during the Bronze Age, rank-size data collected by the Suburbium project—a research project regarding Bronze Age Latium Vetus managed by the Sapienza University of Rome—reveals a "double-convex" curve, which may indicate a settlement hierarchy in which communities were organized around centrally located towns. Alternatively, the atypical trendline may result from inaccurately defining the borders of the chosen survey area, or—as Mogetta suggests—due to an incomplete sample of settlements within the area. The notion of a system of low settlement integration is somewhat contradicted by the Spatial Efficiency Model, which implies a certain level of polycentric organization in the region by the Bronze Age. Furthermore, according to the archaeologist Luca Alessandri, the system of hierarchical settlement organization may have developed earlier—perhaps around the Final Bronze Age period 1/2. Alessandri cites the presence of smaller settlements situated around Rome and Ficana during this period. Moreover, Alessandri notes that the settlements of Pelliccione and Le Grottacce likely produced salt through briquetage, probably utilizing pottery manufactured in, and thus imported from, a different community. Alessandri argues that these towns were likely organized around this hypothetical production center, which he identifies with Casale Nuovo, an area that contained Mycenaean pottery imports. This system, according to Alessandri, attests to a hierarchical arrangement in which larger settlements held authority of smaller ones.

=== Hierarchical and federative polities ===
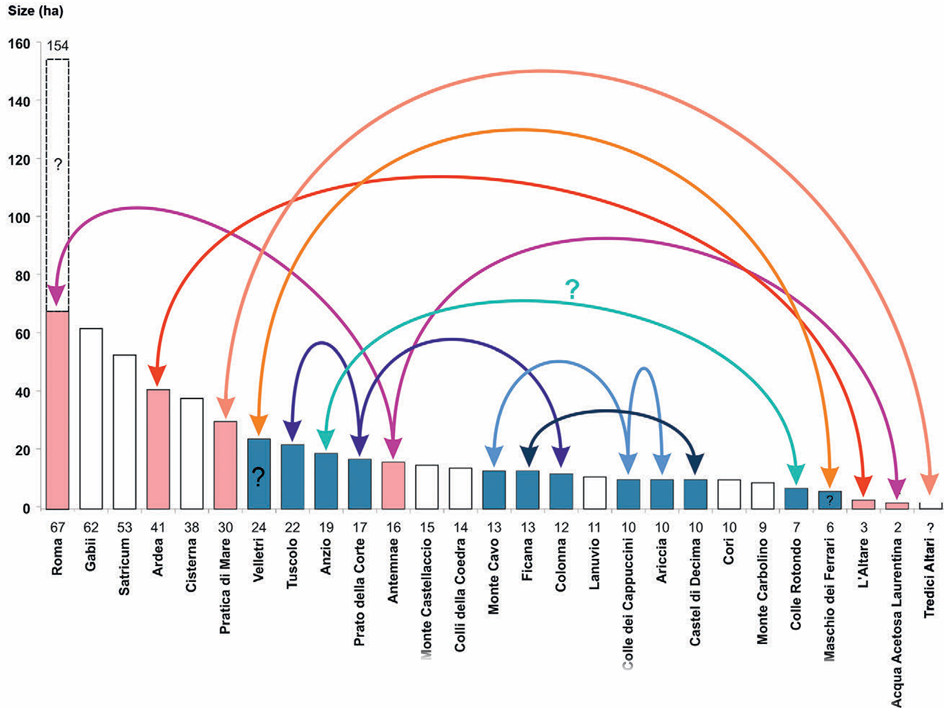
Organization of Latial settlements during the Roma-Colli Albini Period IIB according to Alessandri. The arrows connect settlements belonging to the same polity. The pink signifies hierarchical polities while the blue represents federative polities.

By the 9th-century BCE, a system of settlement organization had emerged in which smaller systems—below 15-20 hectares in size—were situated around larger settlements, usually around 40-50 hectares in size, although examples of settlements between 25-50 hectares are known. Burial grounds scattered throughout Latium attest to, around the mid-8th-century BCE another tier in the settlement system: small-scale, rural communities that were likely populated primarily by upper-class individuals. The growth of these aristocratic communities may explain the dramatic increase in the number of inhabited areas in Latium during the Orientalizing period. Based on the application of central place theory to Latial society, Fulminante concludes that Old Latium possessed a K-value between three and four during the Early Iron Age I and a K-value between two and three during the Early Iron Age II and onwards. Within central place theory, the K-value represents the ratio between the number of available markets within a select layer of the settlement hierarchy and the number of markets in the next highest tier. Lower K-values, particularly values lower than three, are associated with a tendency to maximize the quantity of central settlements and thus maximize market efficiency. Mogetta argues that the highly-developed political organization indicated by the K-values is incongruent with the Site Catchment theories developed by the archaeologist John Bintliff, which—when applied, by Fulminante, to Early Iron Age Latium—predicted an unstable political system marred by demographic pressures.

Other Latial cities were organized into groups of similar-sized communities located in close proximity to each other. According to Alessandri, this layout suggests that these towns were organized into collective leagues of settlements in which each individual community held a roughly equal rank. Fulminante aimed to analyze the hierarchical and federative polities of Old Latium utilizing multiplicatively weighted Voronoi diagrams, with the model weighted according to settlement size. According to Fulminante, since the tessellation develops proportionally to both settlement distance and size, it can depict the growth of settlements, particularly under the influence of larger neighboring communities. Utilizing this model, Fulminante concluded that—during the end of the 11th and the beginning of the 10th centuries BCE—the coast of Old Latium was dotted by such equally-spaced and equally-sized cities. However, the more inland regions appeared to be largely influenced by Rome, Gabii, the Alban Hills, and Lavinium. Nevertheless, Alessandri argues that multiplicatively weighted Voronoi diagrams are insufficient to determine settlement hierarchy and merely rely on the assumption of hierarchical organization based on other factors. Instead, Alessandri proposes a "Bubble Model" premised upon calculations of the minimum distance in which a settlement can exert authority. Within this model, all settlements are presumed to be federative until any contradictory evidence is discovered, such as the longevity of the settlement or its defensibility.

Ziółkowski argues that many smaller communities protected by an agger—a type of defensive earthwork—may have functioned independently, noting that such a structure indicates the local settlement was organized and capable of coordinating the resources necessary for the construction project. Other archaeologists, such as Marco Pacciarelli, interpret settlement size as the primary indicator of settlement power and, consequently, consider many settlements guarded by an agger to be fortified border towns subordinate to larger cities. However, Ziółkowski argues that assessing the autonomy or significance of a settlement based upon its size is inherently fallacious, as even small settlements can remain independent as long as they are capable of defending themselves. Furthermore, Ziółkowski notes that attempts to categorize Latial settlements according to size are often inconsistent. For instance, Pacciarelli proposed a size requirement of 15 hectares for a community to be considered autonomous. Nevertheless, he designates the settlements of Ariccia, Lanuvium, Tusculum, and Velitrae as independent despite failing to reach the minimum required size.

==== Site catchment theory ====
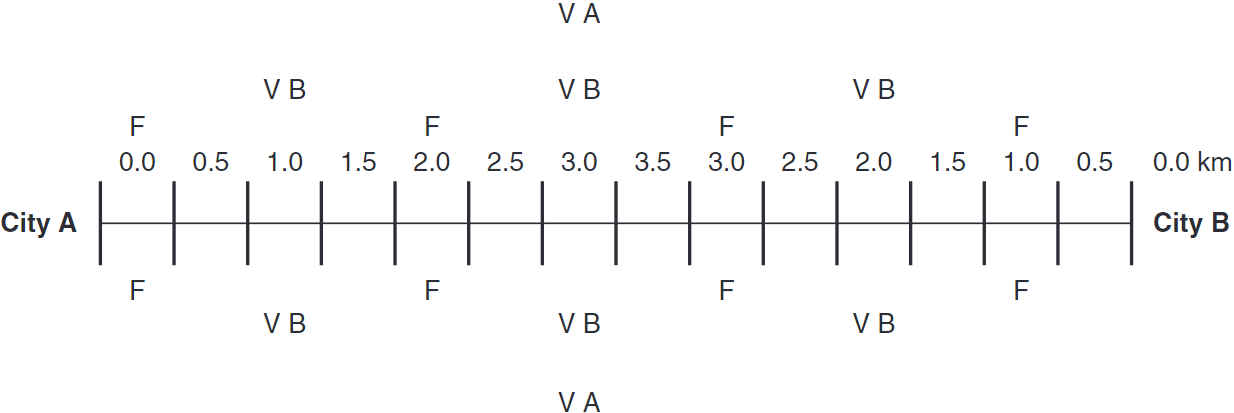
Settlement distribution in the area surrounding Rome during the Orientalizing and Archaic period

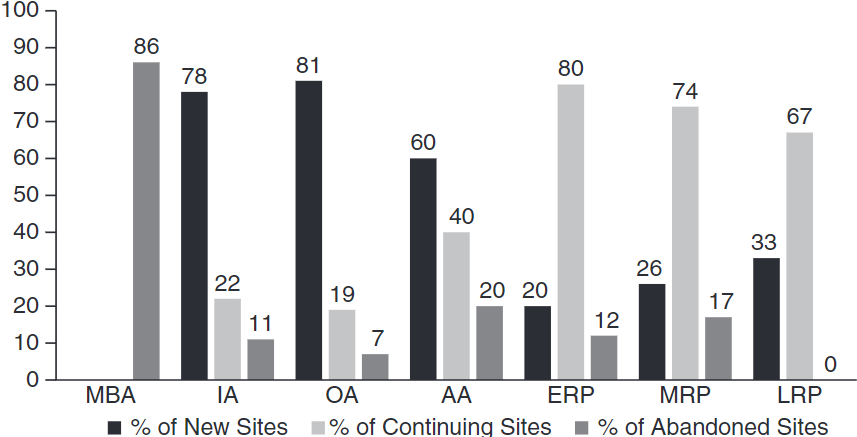
Emergence of settlements within the vicinity of Rome from the Middle Bronze Age to the Republican era.

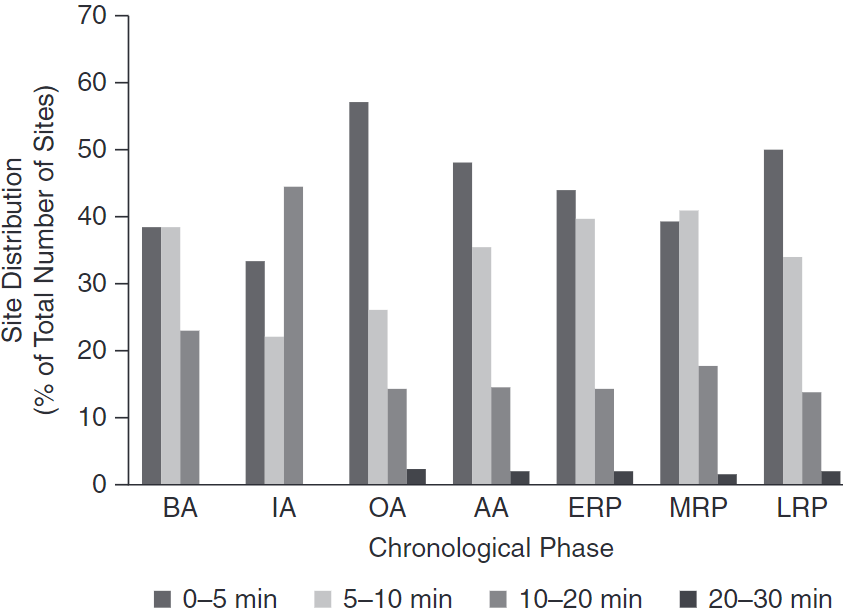
Sites in the vicinity of Rome organized according to walking distance from rivers.

Urbanization in Old Latium can be further analyzed according to the site catchment models outlined by John Bintliff. According to Bintliff, within certain types of agrarian civilizations, a system in which each settlement is provided a territorial radius of around five kilometers provides the ideal amount of available land and resources to each community. In Latium, during the Bronze Age, the highest-ranking communities were typically around five to six hectares large and usually situated around ten to fifteen kilometers from the nearest first-order settlements. This indicates that first-order towns in the Bronze Age typically bore an average territorial radius of 5-7.5 kilometers, which may correspond to the optimal standard of five kilometers outlined by Bintliff.

According to Bintliff, population growth and the subsequent birth of new settlements may progressively reduce the average territorial radius from around five kilometers to three to four kilometers and eventually two to three kilometers. These ranges can remain relatively stable and need not accompany any significant economic burden imposed on the broader civilization. During the Early Iron Age, the increasing number of minor settlements were typically situated around seven to nine kilometers from the nearest urban center, thereby possessing a radius of around 3.5-4 kilometers. Bintliff suggests that, following this period, the typical settlement radius may decrease to one to two kilometers, which may reflect overpopulation or limited resource availability. This ultimate stage may—according to Fulminante—correspond to the Early Iron Age II and the ensuing periods, by which time the distance between minor settlements and proto-urban cities had lowered to around five to six kilometers, leading to an average territorial radius of 1.5-2.5 kilometers.

Fulminante aimed to analyze Latial urbanization through the application of theoretical models of human societal development to the territory surrounding Rome. The sample size for her study was limited to an area now included within the Municipio IV, an administrative division of Rome. Thus, the research may not apply to the entirety of Latium, though Fulminante suggests it could still provide a useful "micro-analysis" of a particular subset of Latial settlements. During the Orientalizing and Archaic eras, within the area around Rome, cities—which were, in this study, defined as sites larger than 25 hectares—were usually spaced around six to eight kilometers from each other. However, the settlements of Fidenae, Crustumerium, and Rome were situated around six kilometers from each other, an unusually short distance for major settlements according to the theories of Bintliff. Fulminante addresses this issue by suggesting that the Anio River may have served as a physical barrier interfering with settlement dynamics and that a ford near Crustumerium may have provided an added incentive for the inhabitation of the area. Another possibility also raised by Fulminante is that the cities of Crustumerium and Fidenae were both dependent on Rome or perhaps that only Fidenae was dependent on either Rome, Crustumerium, or both. However, Mogetta suggests that this problem may indicate that the model proposed by Bintliff may not adequately represent Old Latium.

Typically, the settlements surrounding the major urban cities within the surveyed land were concentrated within a range of three to four kilometers from the central urban area. This territory was further subdivided into multiple layers, each primarily containing a different type of settlement. The first layer consisted of farms and homesteads that were typically placed within a kilometer of a nearby city. Farms and homestead were more generally established within a kilometer of larger settlements, including Villages B, which were defined as towns sized between one and four hectares. Villages B were themselves often situated at either the one-to-two-kilometer range—equivalent to the second layer—or the three to four kilometer range from cities, which equates to the fourth layer. The third layer, located in the kilometer between the two separate strata of Villages B, consisted largely of farms and homesteads. Finally, Villages A—defined as towns sized between 1,000 square meters and one hectare—occupied the fringes of Latial settlement distribution; they were usually situated around halfway between cities, typically between 0.5-1 kilometers from the outer range of Villages B.

=== Social networks ===
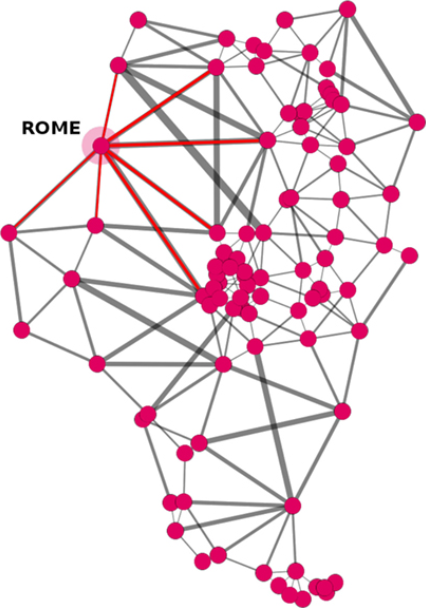
Model of Latial networks during the Early Iron Age I according to the Average Clustering Coefficient. Other models calculated utilizing alternative methods provide different results. The lines highlighted in red depict connections to Rome.

The archaeologist Emma Blake argues, based on her examination of the social networks in West-Central Italy, that a distinctive Latial culture may have emerged by the Bronze Age. Blake suggests that interactions between different communities can be indicated in the archaeological record by the presence of objects from foreign cultures. According to Blake, such objects were most likely reached Latium through coastal ports, before travelling inland via intraregional trade. Henceforth, the appearance of similar foreign imports in sites located nearby each other may indicate that the areas were connected via trade. Further analysis of the distribution of imports across West-Central Italy may reveal two separate clusters of foreign goods with Latium and Etruria. Blake argues that these results indicate a high-level of connectivity within Latium, which may have functioned as the precursor to the later sense of a collective Latin ethnicity. Nevertheless, Blake concedes that the accuracy of her study is somewhat unreliable due to the small dataset, with Blake even suggesting that the Latial subgroup is "too small for its structure to be entirely convincing." Moreover, the archaeologist John F. Cherry argues that all applications of social network analysis to archaeology—including that of Blake—suffer from incomplete and highly-variable datasets, as the archaeological record naturally does not preserve all material and can change significantly with additional discoveries. Cherry warns that the data gathered by Blake may not remain true when challenged by further excavations and new information.

Based on the application of social network analysis to Latial society, Fulminante concluded that control over trade networks and proximity to numerous neighbors were among the most important factors spurring the growth of the primary towns within Latial settlement hierarchies. Moreover, architectural investigation of Latial sites indicates that most sizeable settlements were situated on an important trade route, thereby necessitating travel through the community. For instance, the medial position of Latium between Etruria and Campania provided Latial communities such as Rome with the opportunity to capitalize on commerce between the two regions. Alessandri suggests that a site near trade routes may have allowed for the influx of currency to a specific settlement, thereby providing a financial basis for the consolidation of power. Fulminante, alongside the archaeologists Sergei Lozano and Luce Prignano, attempted to synthesize multiple measures of network centrality into one unified index. They concluded that their ultimate combined index, when factoring in river connections, was most applicable to the Bronze Age and lost validity from the Iron Age onwards. Thus, the researchers argue that land routes likely grew in significance whereas maritime routes likely diminished in importance, possibly due to difficulties adjusting rivers to changing socioeconomic situations.

According to the archaeologist Juha Tuppi, the smaller range of available land in Latium compared to Etruria resulted in heightened competition over the scarcer resources, perhaps explaining the greater prevalence of fortifications in 8th-7th century BCE Latial settlements than in contemporary Etruscan cities. Tuppi further suggests that, since Latial settlements allocated more resources to defense, they were less able to invest in infrastructure development, perhaps resulting in the biased distribution of road-cuttings towards Southern Etruria. Fulminante, based on the application of Actor-network theory and Assemblage theory, suggests that the political importance of different Latial settlements can be analyzed via the transportation networks of Latium, as the creation of a pathway between areas reflects the necessity of travel between areas, and consequently, their significance. This investigation resulted in inconsistent data regarding Old Latium, likely because the models did not properly account for the extreme centralization around a select few sites found in Latium. To remedy this issue, Fulminante reutilized a model that examined the proportion of existing connections amongst all the possible pathways between Latial settlements, but introduced a new stipulation by which new road connections were skewed towards already prominent sites. According to Fulminante, the results of this data showcase that the uneven distribution of settlement power in Old Latium likely characterized infrastructure development within the region.

== Hierarchization ==
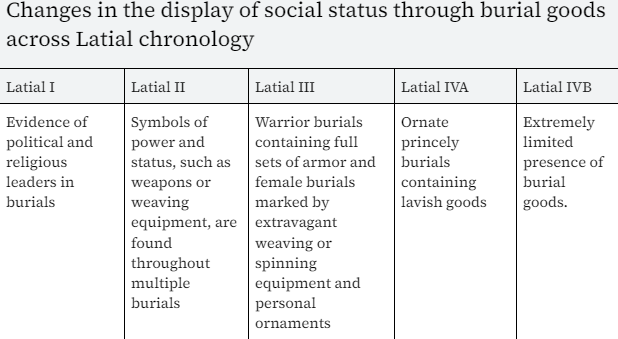
Changes in the display of social status through burial goods across Latial chronology.

The archaeologist Anna Maria Bietti Sestieri argues that—during the first period—the settlement of Osteria likely lacked a centralized administrative body and was instead governed by multiple autonomous kinship groups. Sestieri premises her analysis upon the distinctions in the material culture of each group, indicating that—although they maintained a broadly similar identity—they expressed a certain degree independence. Moreover, these grave clusters are spatially separated from each other, further corroborating the notion that they bore a sense of sovereignty. Although this period of Latial history can be characterized as somewhat "egalitarian", there was still likely a certain level of social differentiation and hierarchy within each kinship group, as evidenced by the existence of wealthier burials marked by more ostentatious burial goods.

Grave goods from Latial necropolises indicate that, during periods II and III, Latial society was generally impoverished. Goods gradually became more developed over time, but within any one time were relatively uniform, indicating relatively low levels of wealth inequality. Nevertheless, the classicist Gary Forsythe argues that this economic development, however incremental, may still have motivated the concurrent social shifts during the third Latial period. Among the Latial III burials from Osteria, there is a grave situated within the center of a funerary cluster that belongs to an older male who was entombed with a life-sized—not miniature—weapon. The inclusion of an older male in such a prominent role contrasts with the prior periods at Osteria, during which time the powerful or prestigious positions were largely reserved for young adult men, perhaps as older or younger individuals were considered physically unfit. It is possible that this aberrance reflects a shift in the political system of Latial society, as physical prowess may have no longer constituted a necessary prerequisite for authority.

According to Fulminante, Latial society during period II may have followed a "corporate" mode of organization, which may have falsely presented a sense of egalitarianism that concealed the hierarchical nature of the contemporary Latial culture. The distinction between "corporate" and "network" societies was first established by the archaeologist Gary M. Feinman—originally for the purpose of describing Mesoamerican civilizations. Feinman identified "corporate" type societies as characterized by more even distributions of wealth and power, an emphasis on group-identity, and an economy centered around food production. "Network" societies are defined by the concentration of wealth in a smaller group of elites who emphasize displays of prestige and self-aggrandizement. During period II, Latial society was marked by a diverse spread of status markers (i.e. weapons or weaving tools) throughout the funerary record, itself indicative of a relatively wide distribution of power. Furthermore, the presence of food storage containers—such as jars or barrels—in period II graves, may attest to an economy based upon food production. Another aspect of "corporate" societies—the significance of group identity—may also be represented by the organization of period II burials into clusters of related tombs that likely belonged to the same kinship group. Feinman proposes that the centralization of a society is not necessarily related to hierarchization and, consequently, that a high or low level of centralization does not indicate a correlated level of stratification. Fulminante suggests that the same may hold true for Old Latium: The Latial culture, during period II, may have been stratified despite the seemingly dispersed and decentralized social structure.

The archaeologists Matthew Naglak and Nic Terrenato argue that the prohibition of intramural adult burials following the 9th-century BCE was likely the first instance of a societal or political action enacted collective by entire Latial settlements. According to Naglak and Terrenato, such a decision would require the mutual willingness of all individual house groups to actively obey the new regulations on burials, indicating the beginnings of community-wide decision-making. These same scholars propose that the origin of communal decision-making in Latium was likely related to concerns regarding the safety of the settlement. They argue that Latial clans were incentivized to unify into a single proto-urban center to provide themselves with protection from the intertribal raiding commonplace throughout Bronze Age Latium. The formation of the first proto-urban sites would have necessitated a shared agreement regarding the demarcation of the territory, a decision that possibly—according to Naglak and Terrenato—related to the territorial prescriptions concerning intramural inhumation. Naglak and Terrenato note that the territory suitable for adult inhumations and the land reserved for infant burials is similar to the boundary upon which defensive fortifications were later established around cities, perhaps indicating that the origins of communal decision-making in Latium were related to concerns regarding the protection of the settlement.

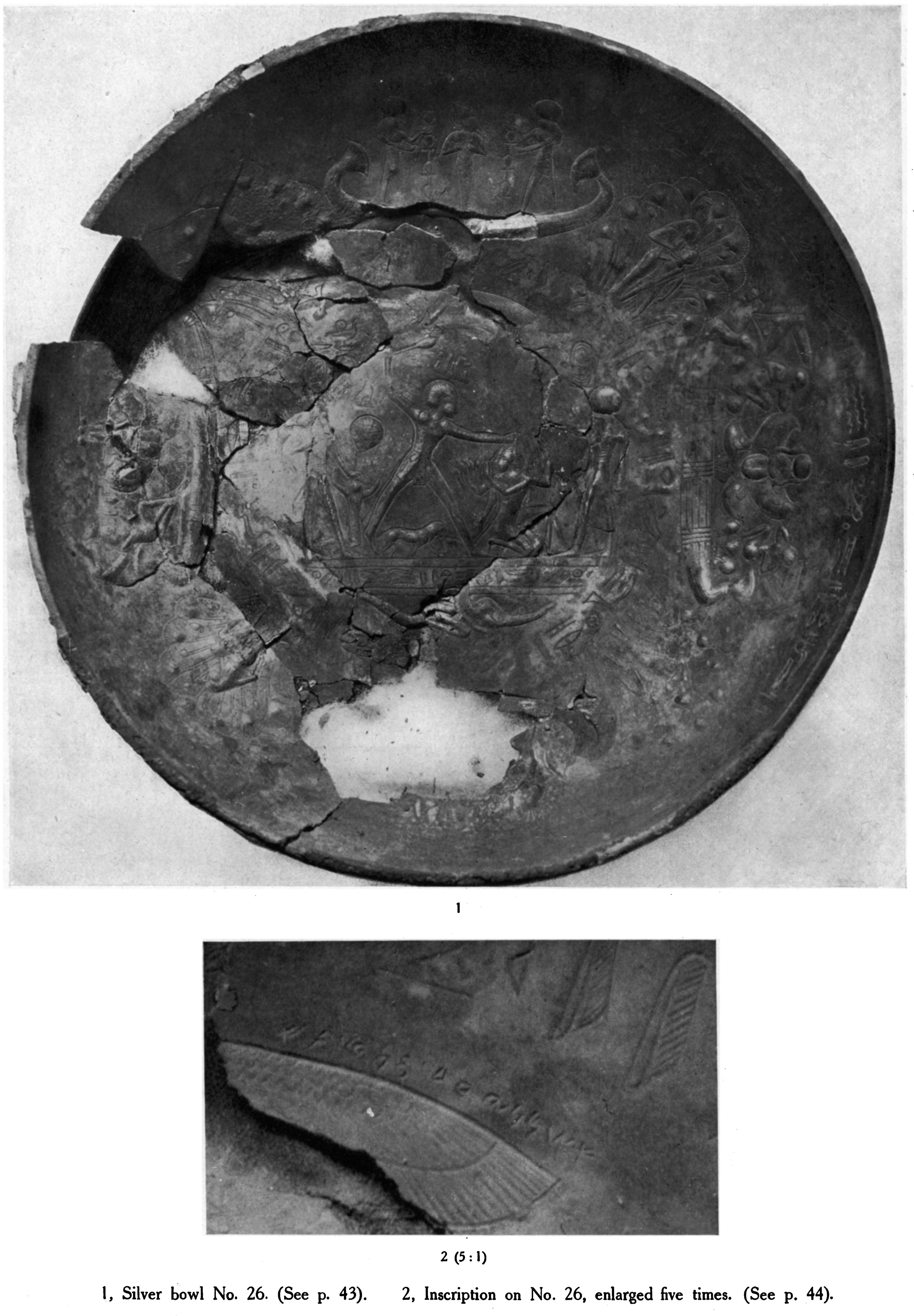
Gilded silver bowl from the Bernardini tomb.

Social stratification became more apparent in the archaeological record by the end of the 8th-century and during the 7th-century BCE, at which time new types of "princely" burials appeared that were characterized by lavish accoutrements. Trade with other Mediterranean cultures prompted the rising visibility of hierarchy within the archaeological record, as these "princely" tombs often included imported materials from the Eastern Mediterranean. For instance, the Barberini and Bernardini tombs, discovered in 1855 and 1876 respectively, contained large numbers of gold and silver objects along with interior artwork inspired by the Near East. Some of the objects were likely imported from Egypt or Phoenicia: one silver bowl contains a Phoenician inscription while depicting an Egyptian pharaoh in battle. "Princely" tombs often included the then more fashionable or modern goods, such as fans or banqueting equipment, alongside the more traditional status markers, such as weapons or weaving tools.

In the past, it was believed that these tombs in Latium reflected an Etruscan domination but further evidence from across Italy indicates that princely tombs of this sort were common on the peninsula and likely reflected common trends during the Orientalizing period across the peninsula's cultures. Fulminante argues that Orientalizing trade possibly motivated social and economic development in the Latial culture, as Latial aristocrats may have aimed to expand material production to further enmesh themselves in pan-Mediterranean trade networks. (Note: Nijboer considers the term "aristocrat" to be inappropriate for the Orientalizing period as he argues that the presence of multiple families vying to acquire social status in one community indicates that the Latial upper-class was—at this time—more akin to patrons in a patron-client system.) Alternatively, Latial aristocrats sought to showcase their status and wealth via the deposition of ornate goods within burials. Moreover, Cornell argues that the growth of settlements had created social hierarchy in which Latial aristocrats strove to place themselves at the top, thereby necessitating a shift from private displays and towards public displays that emphasized the larger community. Fulminante suggests that the rise of princely burials may reflect a transition to a "network" system of organization, as "network" societies are likewise characterized by the concentration of wealth and authority within a small class of elites and an emphasis on public demonstrations of prestige.

== Economy ==
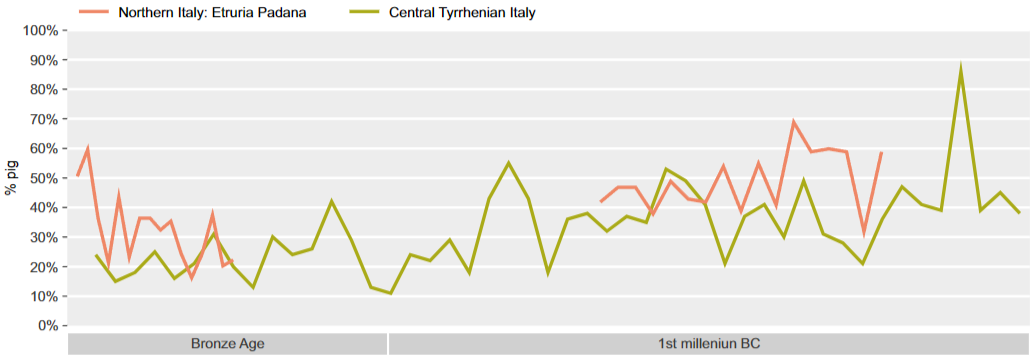
Percentage of animal bones identified as belonging to pigs across Italy.

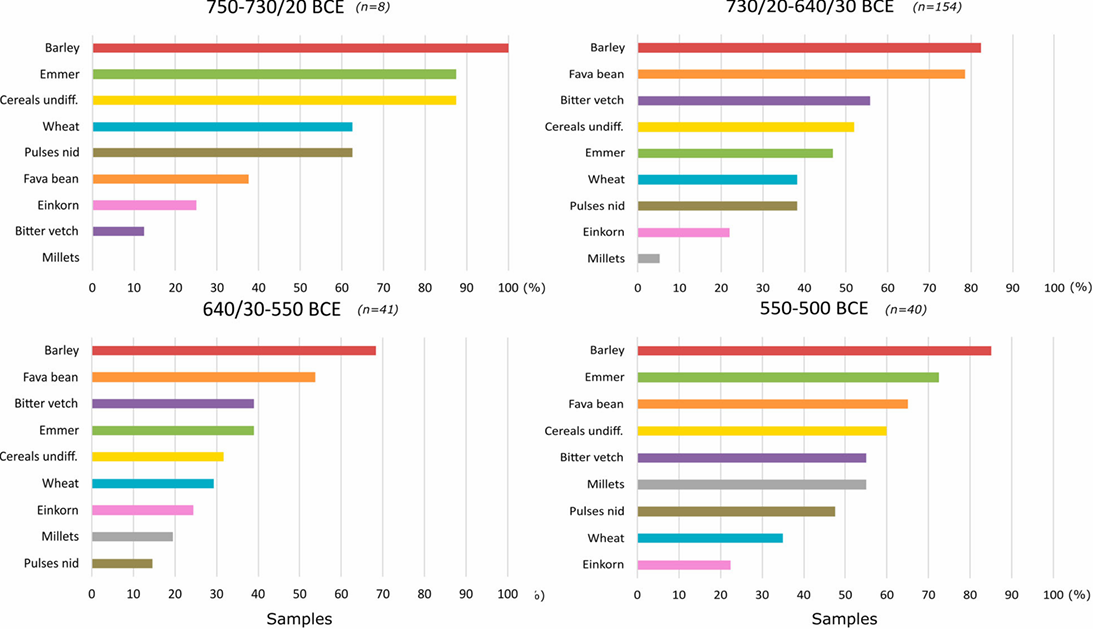
Distribution of crop samples across two areas within Gabii.

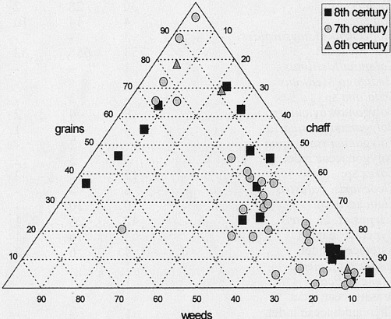
Distribution of agricultural products across the Palatine hill.

=== Agriculture ===
The economies of Bronze Age settlements in Old Latium were dependent upon the extraction of natural resources, particularly via agriculture or animal husbandry. In particular, Latial society extensively utilized animals such as ovicaprines and cattle. For instance, a sample of Late Bronze Age animal bones from the Capitol hill consists almost entirely of sheep, goats, cattle, and pigs. Likewise, another sample of bones uncovered within Iron Age buildings in Fidenae is also largely composed of the same animal species. Beyond the usage of domestic animals, Latial people could acquire food through hunting. However, the archaeologist Jacopo De Grossi Mazzorin argues that, in Latial society, the hunting of large animals may have been restricted to the wealthy, as it likely would have required a coordinated hunting party and a significant amount of available free time, both of which may have only been accessible to the rich. Moreover, 22% of the animal bones uncovered within an upper-class house in Ficana comprise the remnants of deer skeletons—themselves an animal typically classified as wild game.

Examination of 13 Late Bronze Age cremation burials from a cemetery near Colle Rotondo suggests that meat was likely a minor source of protein within the overall diet of the deceased, which mostly comprised cereals, vegetables, and fish. Further data from a sample of likely upper-class individuals from Iron Age Gabii reveals that the studied sample largely consumed plants that utilized C3 Carbon fixation or herbivores that themselves feasted on such plants. The Gabine skeletons have much higher levels of nitrogen isotopes than samples from Iron Age Osteria, perhaps indicating that their diet included proteins belonging to a higher trophic level. By the later Iron Age, pig consumption increased greatly across Latial sites such as Ficana or Fidenae, possibly because the relative ease of rearing pigs facilitated prolific utilization of the animal for supplying the needs of an expanding population. The increase in pig consumption in Rome was far more significant than in other Latial sites, perhaps due to the larger population of Rome.

Pollen core samples from the Pontine region attest to increases in the quantity of wheat pollen during the Late Bronze, itself evidence of rising crop cultivation. Moreover, beginning around the Late Bronze Age and continuing until the Early Iron Age, the tree population—except for Quercus robur—suffered a significant decrease. It is possible that this shift reflects increasing efforts to clear trees for the creation of new land suitable for agriculture. There is evidence for the cultivation of grapes and olives in early Latium, as remains of such plants have been uncovered in deposits by the Via Sacra that date between 8th and the 6th centuries BCE. Moreover, samples of such plants have been uncovered in other central Italian sites, such as Bolsena or Cures. The Roman samples were uncovered alongside remains of cereals—such as emmer wheat or durum wheat—which may attest to the presence of polyculture in the region. However, results from the Pontine land survey provided no evidence for the cultivation of cereals and olives—and, consequently, the introduction polyculture—during the Early Iron Age, although it did demonstrate that the land became slightly more amenable to the practice. By the third Latial period, crop rotation techniques had emerged in Latium, which—when combined with animal husbandry—facilitated the existence of a mixed farming system in Latium.

During later periods, unlike other industries, agriculture did not necessarily undergo standardization: Diversities in crop output may have persisted, perhaps indicating that agricultural production remained decentralized. The archaeologist Laura Motta examined weed, chaff, and grain samples dated between the 8th-6th centuries BCE that were uncovered in trenches by the Palatine hill, revealing that—among contemporaneous sites—there was great heterogeneity in the composition of agricultural produce across the area. Preferences for different kinds of agricultural product indicate differing crop production techniques—an abundance of grain attests to pounding techniques, whereas an abundance of chaff indicates that, in addition to pounding, the crops were also sieved. Despite such discrepancies, the prevalence of grain increased throughout all sites over time, perhaps indicating a standardized system of production capable of establishing a degree of uniformity. However, Motta argues that a certain level of agricultural autonomy was likely preserved, thereby allowing for the continued availability of unique varieties of crop.

Furthermore, Motta argues that each trench may have reflected a different stage within the crop production process, as the ratio of agricultural produce within each site is correlated to their respective trenches: Grains are primarily concentrated in the Sestore 9 trench, while chaff and weeds were largely concentrated within areas 4 and 5. More specifically, Motta proposes that areas 4 and 5 represent a later stage of a—due to their position within the city walls—particularly domestic production system. The interpretation of Sestore 9 is more unclear, although the environment of the area was likely hostile towards settlers and probably deterred the establishment of households. Consequently, the consumption patterns evidenced at the site may not reflect those of ordinary Latial civilians, but instead the dietary habits of soldiers responsible for patrolling the nearby section of wall. If the food was distributed towards local soldiers by an external force, then it is likely that there existed a centralized body managing agricultural production capable of independently producing and shipping supplies. Based on this evidence, Motta proposes that the local society may have organized itself around a heterarchical structure in which decentralized domestic production systems coexisted with centralized production.

=== Pottery ===
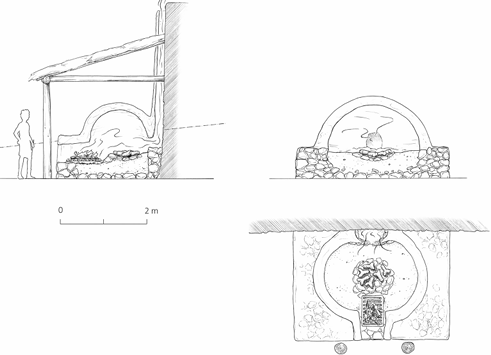
Reconstruction of an Iron Age terracotta Kiln in Gabii.

Attempts at the recreation of 9th-8th century BCE ceramic artifacts from Osteria indicate that many vessels were produced via coil techniques, burnishing, and hand forming. According to Sestieri, it is possible that kilns were in use during the Iron Age, as evidenced by the homogenous red or light red color of the dolia at Osteria. However, Sestieri notes that much of the Period II pottery from Osteria is characterized by a black and brown surface dotted by various light spaces, which indicates that the artisans likely possessed little control over the firing process. It is likely that most of the pottery of this period was heated in an open flame, thereby scorching the vessel as it was not protected from the fire. Nevertheless, Sestieri notes that many of the Period II vessels in Osteria were structurally stable and resistant to breakage. Impressed or incised decorations often adorned ceramic goods in Osteria at this time, particularly during period IIA. According to Nijboer, between the 9th and 5th centuries BCE, pottery creation was most likely a domestic task that predominately fell upon women.

It is possible that pottery production existed during the Final Bronze Age at Latial sites such as Pelliccione. Excavations at the site suggest that the area contained a far greater quantity of pottery than would have been necessary to supply the needs of the populus, perhaps indicating that the excess pottery was produced for the purpose of trading the goods with other settlements. However, the archaeologists Rasmus Brandt and Albert Nijboer have both concluded that—from the 9th to the 8th century BCE—pottery production primarily fulfilled private, personal needs. They argue that ceramic production first acquired more financial motivations when, around the end of the 8th-century and during the 7th-century BCE, the social differentiation exemplified by princely tombs—alongside the possible advent of polyculture, (Note: The exact date by which polyculture was introduced to Central Italy is controversial.) population growth, the birth of a pre-monetary economy, and the creation of fortified settlements—helped spark the onset of new socioeconomic conditions. Still, during this time, Brandt and Nijboer suggest that household pottery production still largely served personal use, albeit with the occasional sale or trade.

According to these same scholars, the workshop industry only fully emerged in Latium by the end of the 7th and during the 6th century BCE. Nijboer notes that the complex and meticulously crafted impasto pottery of earlier Latial periods was not suitable for production utilizing a potter's wheel and such impasto pottery, as well as early Latial bucchero pottery, was often produced utilizing a time-consuming and resource-expensive combination of crafting techniques. Collectively, these constraints hindered any manufacturer dedicated to the production of such vessels, as they were easily outcompeted by craftsmen dedicated to the production of Italo-Geometric pottery, a style imitative of contemporary Greek pottery that relied upon the usage of refined clay on a potter's wheel and kilns with separate chambers for firing. Consequently, during the 7th-century, a new system of standardized production emerged that allowed for pottery producers to economically compete with the Italo-Geometric artisans. Pottery production underwent significant systematization across both Etruria and Old Latium during the 700s and 600s BCE, resulting in a greater degree of homogeneity among pottery shapes. Moreover, manufacturers began creating larger quantities of specialized pottery types—such as cotylai, which were used for measurements, or oinochoai, which were utilized as wine containers.

However, Fulminante argues that the growth of pottery manufacturing in Latial society likely occurred earlier than Brandt and Nijboer suggest. Fulminante notes that, during the Latial period III—around the late 800s and early 700s BCE—at Osteria, the diversity of vessel types had decreased significantly, itself indicative of standardized production. Prior to the 6th-century BCE, Latial and Etruscan pottery workshops were typically situated within the centers of developing urban settlements, which attests to a possible relationship between urban growth and industrialization within the Latial economy. Nijboer argues that population growth may have further stimulated industrial expansion, as an increasing population intensified demand for ceramic materials and construction supplies, resources that ceramic manufacturers could provide.

=== Metalworking ===
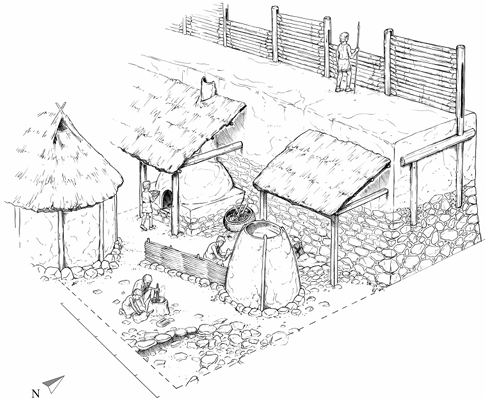
Reconstruction of an Iron Age casting pit in Gabii.

Nijboer proposes that the proliferation of metalworking during the 8th and 7th centuries BCE may have predicated later economic developments. Increasing production during the 8th-century BCE is reflected in the bronze fibulae of this time, which began to be created via a serialized production method. In the area surrounding Rome, a system in which multiple separate variously specialized craftsmen cooperated in the production process may have existed around 850-725 BCE. Contemporary tombs from the Tiber Valley include chariots composed of a wooden frame plated with bronze and wooden wheels coated in iron, indicating that the input of woodworkers, ironsmiths, and bronzesmiths was provided for the creation of these objects.

New metallurgical technologies were introduced around this period, such as carburization and quenching—which first reached Central Italy during the 700s BCE—and granulation, which arrived in Italy by the late 8th and early 7th centuries BCE. Metallographic examination of 7th-century BCE iron knives from Satricum indicates that the craftsmen likely had developed significant metalworking skills, although they still lacked knowledge of certain aspects of metallurgy. Enhanced metalworking techniques allowed for advancements in the quality of gold production. Although goldsmithing in Old Latium may date back to the IIB period—as a period IIB tomb from Santa Palomba includes, among other objects, a gold nail—gold production reached heightened levels of quality by the 7th-century BCE, likely due to the incorporation of new metalworking techniques.

Advancements in metallurgy the manufacture of more substances forged from iron, which—by the 7th-century BCE—had emerged as the preeminent metal in the Latial culture. Unlike Etruria, where iron was—during the 9th and 8th centuries BCE—utilized largely for the creation of ornaments, iron in Latium—during the 8th and 7th centuries BCE—was initially utilized in Latium for the creation of both knives and ornaments. The shift to iron began in the 8th-century BCE with the production of iron knives, which are the first iron materials found in Latial sites. Sestieri notes that, in Osteria, all knives dated after 770 BCE are forged from iron, whereas in previous periods such knives were restricted to more high-status burials. In Satricum, iron artifacts became widespread after 725 BCE, eventually—by, at least, the mid 7th-century BCE—supplanting copper as the most common material at the site. Excavations at Satricum reveal multiple clusters of iron slags—themselves traces of metal-production—that are dated from the 7th-4th centuries BCE, although the majority belong to the 7th or the 6th century BCE.

=== Textiles ===
Alongside the advancements in metallurgy and pottery, textile manufacturing appears to have undergone a process of increasing standardization and specialization during the 7th-century BCE. It is likely that advanced textile manufacturing techniques were already available in Early Iron Age Latium, as the discovery of an 11th-century BCE tablet-woven textile in Santa Palomba and other elaborately crafted Early Iron Age textiles in the Caolino necropolis attests to the availability of weaving technologies during this period. However, finds of textile equipment dated to around this time often surface within domestic areas, indicating that the creation of textiles primarily occurred within private households, not workshops. Moreover, Gleba suggests that—during this period—the technology and skills required for the production of such textiles were likely reserved for upper-class women who were identified in burials by weaving equipment. Textile manufacturing tools generally decreased in size and in diversity of appearance throughout Latial history, a phenomenon Gleba attributes to increasing standardization.

== Funerary rites ==
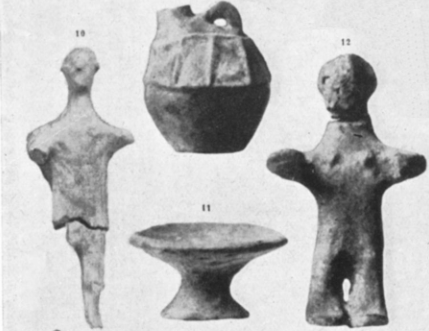
Goods from cremation burials from the Alban hills.

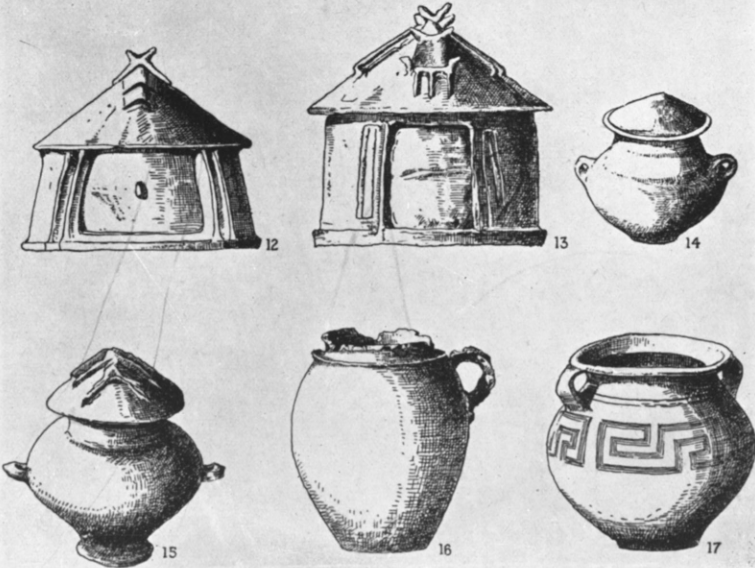
Goods from cremation burials in the Roman Forum.

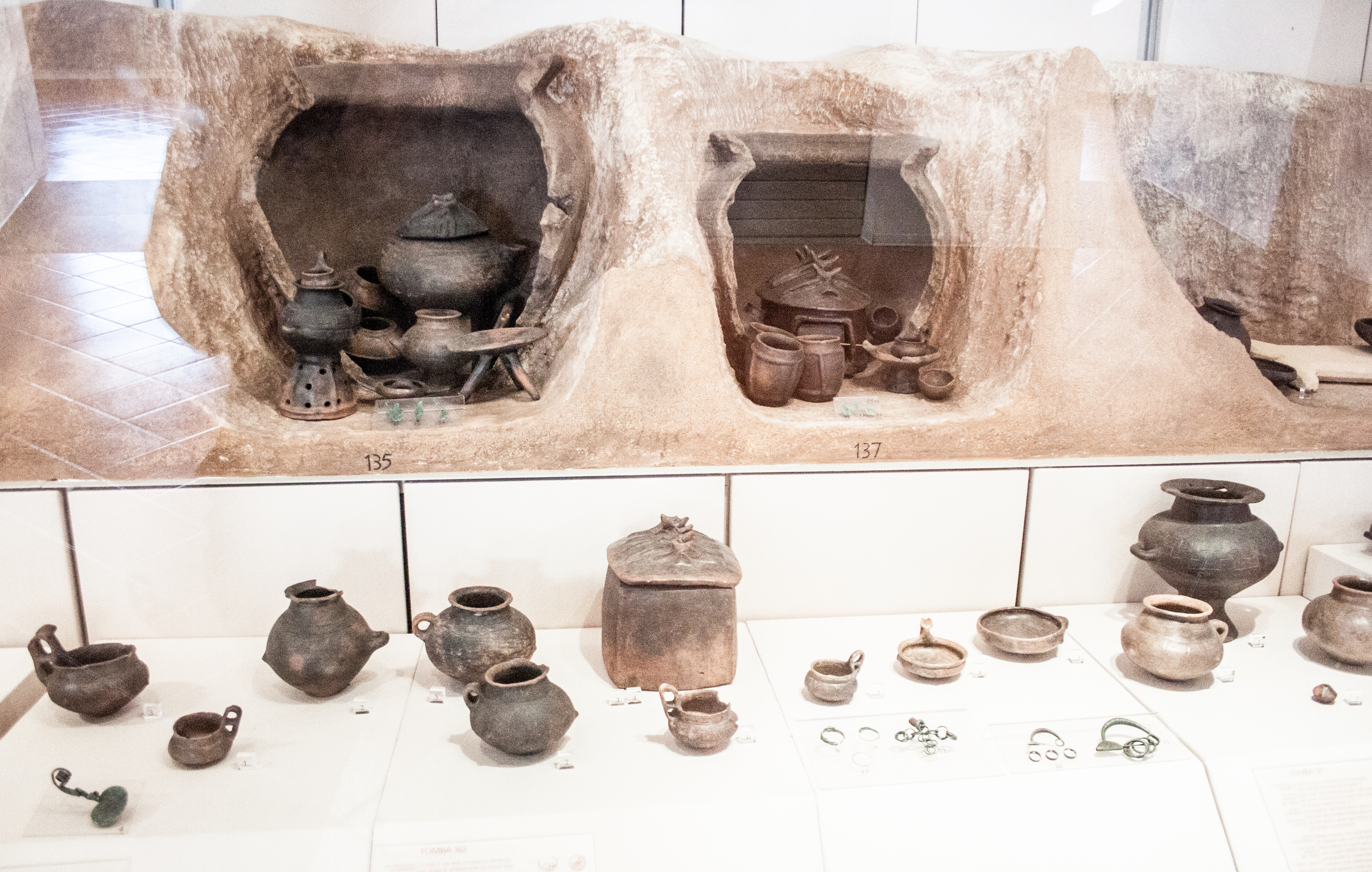
Finds from the necropolis of Osteria dell'Osa, Museo Nazionale Romano

=== Burial techniques ===
Cremation was the only burial ritual used during the Late Bronze Age throughout the Latial culture, including the cemetery at Osteria. The practice was generally restricted to burials of male individuals aged between 17 and 45 at their time of death. Cremation burials are typically found at the center of burial clusters, possibly indicating that the deceased was the head of a household or family, or, alternatively, possibly a local community figurehead. Rossenberg argues that the ritual may have carried domestic connotations in the Latial culture, as the remains of the deceased were often stored in hut-shaped urns, some of which were characterized by ovoid shapes topped by conical lids likely representative of a hut roof. These urns were often themselves stored within either stone containers or a pottery vessel called a "dolium", likely for the purpose of safeguarding the remains. The urns were interred within a type of cylindrical pit that varied between 0.5-1 meter deep and was typically around 1 meter wide. Common ceramic funerary goods for cremation burials during the Latial period II included corded jars, small braziers, and jars with a retaining rim.

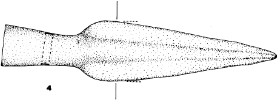
Weapon from a burial in Valvisciolo.

Miniature versions of standard funerary goods were frequently included within cremation burials, a practice largely unique to the Latial culture. Sets of miniature spearheads and figurines were typically placed first within the burial, often at the bottom of the larger container storing the smaller cinerary urn within. These burial objects were thus placed outside the container, whereas other funerary goods—often miniature knives, razors, and swords—were included within the vessel. Sestieri argues that the miniaturization of the grave goods likely derived from fears regarding the spirits of the deceased, which members of the Latial culture—according to Sestieri—sought to protect themselves from by depriving the dead of real weapons. However, the archaeologist Lisa Cougle argues that miniature goods may have been employed in cremation rituals as the usage of real materials would require the burial and consequent loss of said items, thereby wasting potentially valuable resources. Alternatively, the Italian archaeologist Renato Peroni proposes the cremation ritual held religious significance. Peroni notes that miniaturized burial goods are similar to the Latial offerings left in caves and lakes, which likely were dedicated to deities. Furthermore, Peroni argues that the act of cremation necessitates the transfer of the deceased into a more incorporeal state, which itself may reflect the inherently supernatural realm of gods. Among the rare example of cremation burials for women at Osteria, it is common for the deceased to be entombed with life-sized burial goods rather than miniatures.

Cremation tombs remained in use during the Latial period II, although inhumation became more frequent. The most common type of inhumation technique in the Latial Period II involved the interment of the deceased in a rectangular pit referred to as a "fossa" that was then covered with stones or soil. In some tombs, the corpse was laid within a coffin or only on a wooden board. It is possible that the shift from cremation to inhumation burials during the transition from the first to the second Latial period was motivated by external influence from southern Italy, as the new type of fossa burials resemble similar fossa from Campania or Calabria. Another burial type referred to as the "tombe a loculo" utilized a loculus to entomb both the deceased and their funerary goods. Inhumation burials during this period did not necessarily contain exclusively one corpse: Double burials, burials containing two individuals, became more prevalent following the 9th-century BCE. These burials usually contained one male and one female, although several examples of burials containing same-sex pairs are known. Loculi tombs were largely reserved for single burials, although rare examples of double loculi burials have been uncovered, which themselves were usually exclusive to a male and female couple or a mother and a child.

Evidence from the cemetery at Osteria dell'Osa attests to post-mortem tampering with the skeleton of the deceased, which Sestieri argues may constitute instances of secondary burial. In the majority of graves, the skull was separated from its mandible and turned around and—in some graves—the skull was relocated towards the feet. Certain burials also contained skeletons whose long bones were reorganized into parallel pairs. Due to the poor preservation of necropolises in Old Latium, it is unclear whether such customs were pervasive throughout the Latial culture or restricted to the cemetery at Osteria. Even among the skeletons in Osteria, it is indeterminable whether all corpses within the cemetery were subject to such tampering. Sestieri suggests that, following the interment of the deceased, the grave was left uncovered for a period of time, possibly until the deceased's muscle and had decomposed. Following the completion of these rites, the bones could be displaced, and the grave could then be covered with soil or stone.

Amongst the chamber tombs at Cisterna Grande, a cemetery within Crustumerium, it was not uncommon for graves to be modified following the original deposition. One burial at the site found on the floor of a chamber tomb consists of a pile of bones that were intentionally and methodically reorganized. The skull was placed first, followed by the ribs, then the long bones were deposited, and the entire burial was covered in stones. Other skeletons were repositioned to allow additional corpses to be interred within the same loculus. Such a practice indicates that the local inhabitants of Crustumerium did not concern themselves much with preserving the bones of the deceased, which—according to the archaeologist Ulla Rajala—is itself indicative of a belief that the deceased continued to exist in a nonphysical form. Henceforth, the populus of Crustumerium still felt the necessity to inhume the deceased.

==== Later Latial burial techniques ====
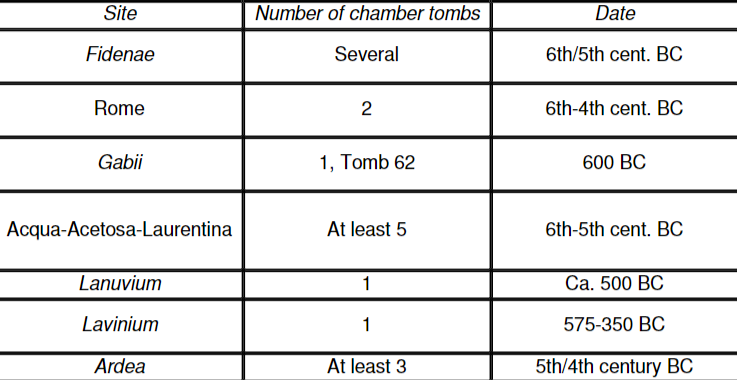
Distribution of 6th-5th century BCE chamber tombs across Latial sites.

Around the late 7th-century BCE and early 6th-century BCE, a new type of burial in which the deceased were housed within a rectangular room carved from tuff—the chamber tomb—became more common in central Italy. The precise details of the design or layout of the chamber tombs at any given site varies significantly across Latium. One Late Orientalizing chamber tomb from Osteria consists of two separate rooms carved from bedrock. In contrast, another tomb from Torrino that was used from the 7th-century BCE to around the 5th-century BCE consists of a singular dromos leading into a central area that splits off into separate rooms each containing one or two loculi. Dromoi and loculi were absent from earlier chamber burials; they only began to appear in such tombs by the end of the 7th-century BCE, or perhaps at the beginning of the 6th-century BCE.

For unknown reasons, no Latial cemetery is fully datable to the 6th-century BCE. There are various possible explanations: Perhaps contemporary burials exist but remain undiscovered or, alternatively, the Latial people may have ceased to inhume their dead. However, Cornell considers both suggestions implausible, as already known cemeteries—despite containing no evidence of 5th-century BCE mortuary practices—include 7th-century BCE burials alongside 4th-century BCE burials. Instead, he proposes that it is likely that burials dated to the 5th to 6th centuries BCE have survived in the archaeological record but are unrecognizable as such because grave goods were not included within the tombs. Cornell argues that the transition away from burial goods is likely related to the concurrent rise in the extravagance of tombs during the Orientalizing period, especially the rising popularity of chamber tombs. He proposes that such tombs indicate that the primary function of funeral services had shifted from commemorating or honoring the deceased to broadcasting the power, prestige, or wealth of their kinship clan. Cornell postulates that such a cultural change would have rendered the deposition of burial goods obsolete, as—if funerals no longer primarily existed to benefit the dead—there was no longer any need to dedicate significant resources towards the deceased.

Giovanni Colonna, an Italian archaeologist, proposed that the restrictions on mortuary goods may relate to prescriptions in the Twelve Tables concerning "the limitation of the expense and the mourning at funerals" ("cetera in duodecim minuendi sumptus sunt lamentationisque funebris"). The 1st-century BCE Roman statesman Cicero claims that such rules were borrowed from the constitution of the Athenian statesman Solon, which may indicate that such practices date back to the time of Solon, which was around the 6th-century BCE. Cornell considers it unlikely that any legislative decree was the sole motivator behind any social change; in part because the transformation in burial practices affected the city of Veii—an Etruscan city firmly removed from Latial authority at this time—but also because Cornell doubts whether it is possible for a single piece of legislation to induce significant cultural shifts. Instead, Cornell argues that the same rising lavishness of burials that underpinned the disappearance of burial goods may have motivated future legislation designed to restrict such activity. Another possibility, posited by the archaeologist Cristiano Viglietti, holds that the reductions in aristocratic expression were intended to present a semblance of legal equality that reinforced the notion of a unified citizenry. Viglietti connects these historical developments in Latium to the supposed reforms of the legendary Roman king Servius Tullius, who was said to have established the census to measure social status according to wealth and not family lineage. The archaeologist Peter Attema notes the existence of a votive deposit in Satricum near a temple that contains prestige material, arguing that this site indicates that the decreasing significance of burial goods during the 6th-century BCE reflects a shift in power from an aristocratic to a priestly class.

=== Burial organization ===
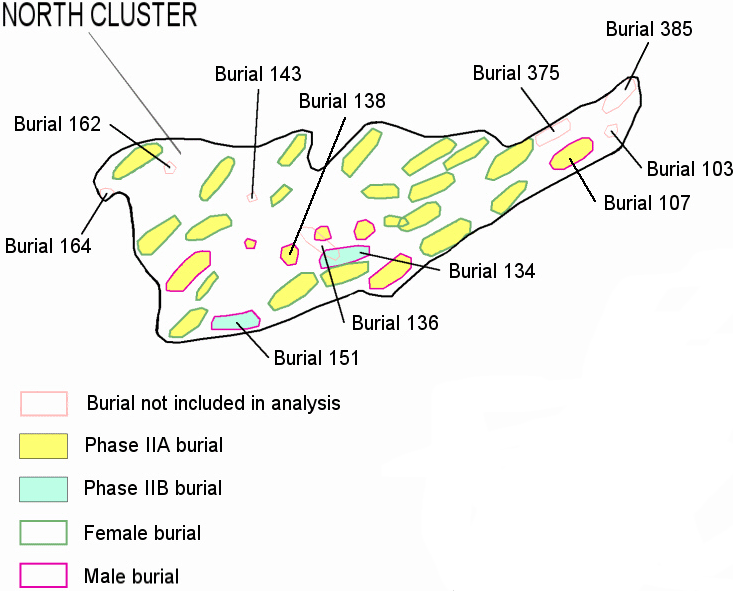
Map of the north cluster of burials at Osteria dell'Osa.

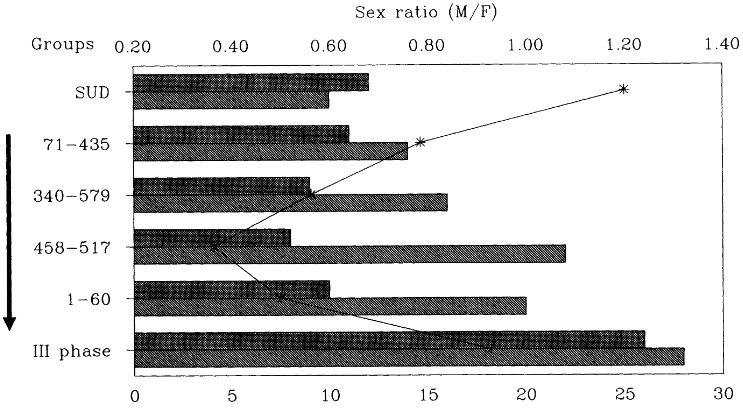
The sex ratio of burials at Osteria dell'Osa during the Latial periods II and III

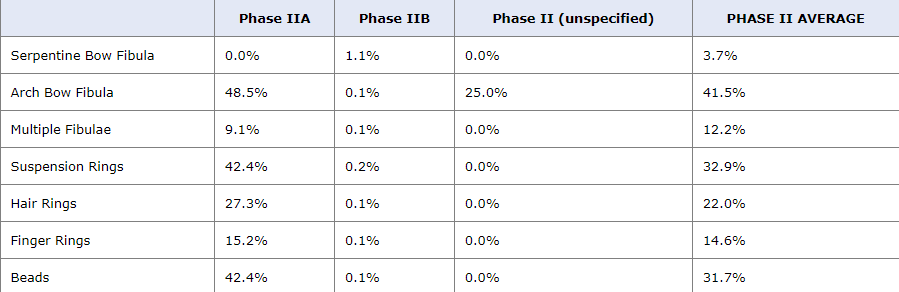
Grave good distribution across Latial Period II subadult burials in Osteria

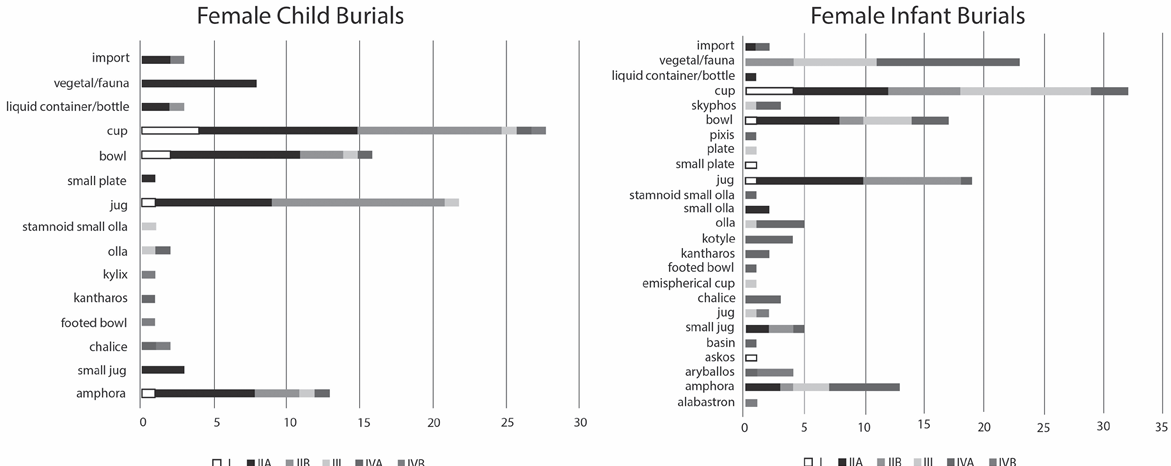
Grave good distribution across female child or infant burials in Old Latium

During the Latial period II, the corpses of the deceased—or their cremated remains—began to be interred within the large necropolises containing hundreds or thousands of burials that first emerged during this time. According to Fulminante, the creation of the necropolises may connect to the concurrent urbanization of this period. Fulminante argues that, alongside the growth of the first urban centers, the notion of distinct areas for the living and the dead emerged. Certain Latial communities—such as the settlement near Castello di Decima—likely made use of only one necropolis situated nearby the area, whereas other Latial settlements—such as the site of Crustumerium—utilized multiple cemetery areas. In the case of communities like Crustumerium, the necropolises were arranged in a circular pattern around the perimeter of the town, perhaps—according to Fulminante—forming a sort of "buffer zone" between the settlement and the surrounding land.

Other corpses, particularly those of children, were buried within the boundaries of the communities themselves, often in close proximity to homes. In Rome, the Sepulcretum—the necropolis located near the site of the later Temple of Antoninus and Faustina—although replete with adult burials prior to the 9th-century BCE, was reserved for infant burials in the following period, whereas adult burials shifted towards extramural areas—particularly at the Esquiline. Several graves placed within the confines of the local community have been identified as belonging to individuals of high social status due to the presence of prestigious burial goods within the tomb. For instance, the archaeological site of Valvisciolo contains a set of four double burials, all of which belong to female individuals, that are located near a votive pit and include numerous important burial goods such as ritualistic knives and various ornaments.

Burials at Osteria during the Latial period II were often organized into clusters of related graves that likely represented a social unit within Latial society. Sestieri further notes that the individuality of each grave was conserved; the Latial culture, during this period, largely ensured that each burial remained spatially distinct and untouched and undamaged by other graves. However, by the Latial period III—at Osteria—graves sites were placed more closely together and burials often intruded upon the space of other burials. The compacted layout of the burials likely did not exclusively derive from any limitations on the area for inhumation, as the grave clusters are separated from each other by unoccupied space, indicating that the burials were intentionally assigned to a specific burial group. Sestieri argues that the intentional congregation of these burials within each group reflects a desire to subdivide the cluster into multiple branches, each of which functioned as a component of the whole. These graves were organized around a set of two, central burials, one of which belonged to an elderly man with a life-sized bronze javelin-head and the other belonged to a younger female individual. According to Sestieri, it is likely that each burial group represented a family branch and that all the individuals interred within each site belonged to the same broader lineage.

Naglak and Terrenato argue that these funerary rites indicate the existence of a "house society," a kinship system in which legal rights, titles, property, or perceived social or moral standing are passed through family lineages. Sestieri identifies this system with the Roman gentes, which were clans of individuals with shared kinship. However, Naglak and Terrenato argue that—despite potential similarities—it is improper to apply the nomenclature of the Roman gentes to Latial society, as the specific features of certain Roman cultural concepts may not have existed within Latial society. Furthermore, archaeologist Christopher Smith criticizes the possible relation between these burial groups and the gentes, as the clusters contain an insufficient number of burials to reflect the massive size of an entire family lineage extending for numerous generations.

Nijboer accepts Smith's line of reasoning, although he adds that the larger necropolises located outside of community areas were sizeable enough to reflect a gens-like kinship group. Nijboer cites the presence of a burial ground outside of Crustumerium that covered 2000 square meters and included at least 88 tombs dated over a time frame of 250–300 years. According to Nijboer, it is likely that multiple, individual family units were included within this larger burial compound, as there were seven chamber tombs placed within the area between the 7th and 6th-centuries BCE. Furthermore, Nijboer notes that several large burial areas existed outside of Crustumerium, indicating that individuals were selected for a specific mortuary ground over the others for a particular reason, a reason that Nijboer suggests may have been their family associations.

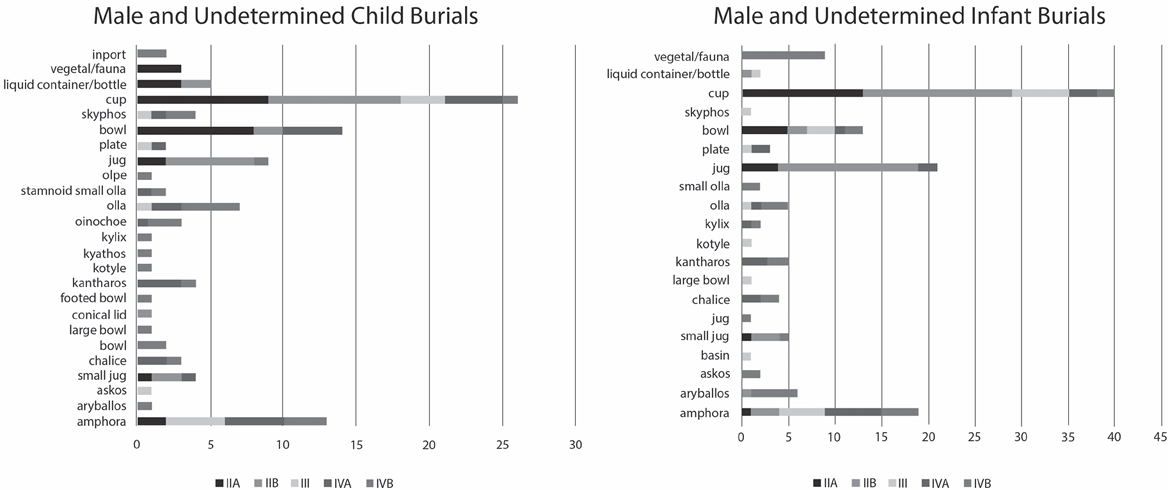
Grave good distribution across male child or infant burials in Old Latium

Regardless, it is possible—according to Naglak and Terrenato—that certain elements of Latial familial organization precipitated the gens system. The archaeologists note the existence of prescriptions in the Twelve Tables regarding the passage of wealth through gentes, which consequently attests to the existence of familial inheritance prior to the institution of the Twelve Tables in the 5th-century BCE. Naglak and Terrenato argue that an emphasis on inheritance through familial lineage is a common practice among house societies that lack any state entity. Thus, the scholars conclude that the laws of the Twelve Tables represent the codification of cultural practices that may date back to the early Latial periods.

Few female burials are attested during the Latial period I, with only five female and two probably female burials of a sample of thirty from the cemetery at Osteria dell'Osa. However, Early Iron Age burials from the same cemetery reveal 250 female burials compared to 188 male burials. The sex ratio among graves in Osteria is most skewed towards women during phase II, during which time cremation burials largely disappeared. If only graves containing burial goods indicative of high social status are considered, then the male-to-female ratios for the Early Iron Age and the Latial period I burials are similar. Henceforth, Sestieri argues that it is likely that—during Latial period I—only individuals of sociocultural importance were buried, most of whom were male. By the Latial period III, alongside increasing social stratification, female and male graves began to appear in more equal quantities at Osteria. Likewise, the cemetery at Crustumerium contains disproportionately more female graves than male graves during the period from 750 and 600 BCE. Archaeologists Albert J. Nijboer and Sarah Willemsen suggest that, at least at the cemetery of Crustumerium, various groups were excluded from interment within the local necropolis. Nijboer and Willemsen note that, alongside the scarcity of male graves at the cemetery, there are few infant or child burials despite the high rates of infant and child mortality during this time period.

Based on the heavily skewed funerary sample from Crustumerium, Nijboer and Willemsen suggest that between 50-75% of the local population may not have been interred within the local necropolis. Fulminante proposes that infant burials only constituted 15-20% of burials dated from the Latial period IIA-IIB, under 20% of Latial period III-IVA burials, although around 30% of burials dated to the IVB period. Finnish archaeologist Sanna Lipkin postulates that the absence of infant burials may be explicable if children were not recognized as full members of the community, warranting burial within a separate cemetery. Infant burials during the Latial periods II and III typically lacked indicators of role or position within a social hierarchy. It was more common, although still rare, during both periods, for objects denoting sex—such as male serpentine fibulae or female weaving equipment—to be placed in child burials.

Excavations in the Latial sites of Rome, Ardea, Lavinium, and Ficana revealed numerous infant burials, usually dated between the Latial period III and IV, that were located beneath the eaves of houses. It is possible that these burials relate to the "subgrundaria" mentioned by Pliny the Elder, which were infant tombs situated near Roman houses. Francesca Roncoroni, an Italian archaeologist, suggests that the custom of interring deceased infants nearby domestic areas may relate to the Roman worship of the Lares and Penates, both of which were types of guardian deity. Infant burials are often situated, more specifically, near wealthier houses with high-status objects. For instance, the settlement at Lavinium contains infant burials located near a set of unusually large huts on the highest hill of the area. Sestieri argues that such placement may reflect an attempt by local aristocrats to mark their family territory through the location of infant burials.

== Gender roles ==
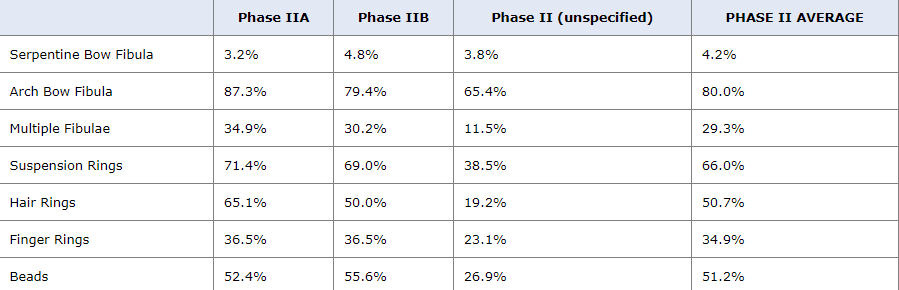
Distribution of funerary goods across Latial Period II adult female burials in Osteria

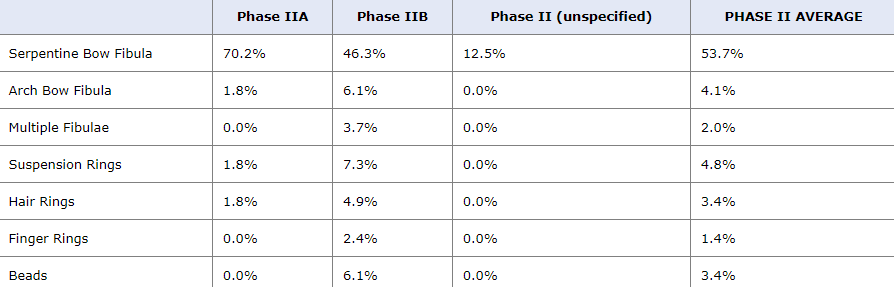
Distribution of funerary goods across Latial Period II adult male burials in Osteria

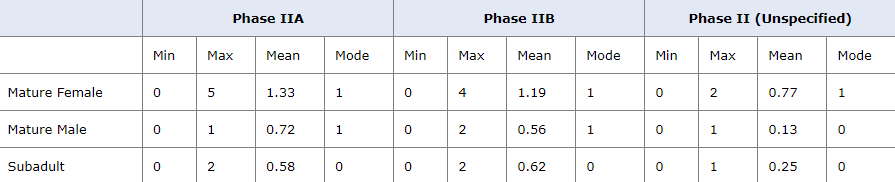
Distribution of fibulae across Latial Period II burials in Osteria

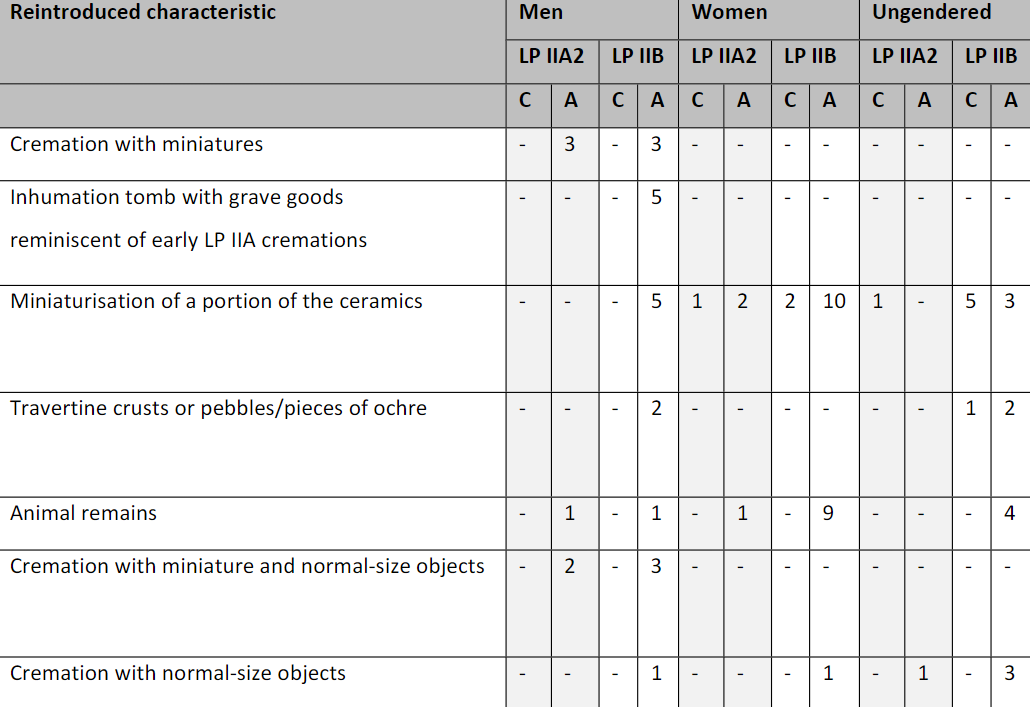
Variance of burial customs across burials of different genders during the Latial period II at Osteria

During the Latial period I, the Latial culture observed a strict distinction between a type of "Warrior" burial exclusive to biologically male individuals and a type of "weaver" burial reserved for biologically female burials. However, the archaeologist Ilona Venderbos proposes that in addition to the standard "warrior" and "weaver" type burials, the Latial culture—during the Late Bronze Age—utilized a third, gender-neutral burial category referred to as the "master of the household". These categories manifested themselves through associated burial goods, many of which were largely exclusive to male or female graves. Female "weaver" burials were characterized by objects such as arch-shaped fibulae, combs, spindles, spools, and spindle whorls. "Weaver" burials throughout the Latial culture often contained items related to the maintenance of physical appearance, particularly hair-related objects such as combs, tweezers, and hair-spirals. In contrast, "Warrior" burials dated to the Latial period I unanimously—with the exception of the settlement at Tenuta Quadraro—contained miniaturized versions of weapons or armor, which often included swords, spears, greaves, lances, or shields. Alongside miniaturized weapons, "warrior" graves often included razors, knives, and other cosmetic adornments. The "master of the household" archetype may appear in the form of the hut-shaped funerary urns that appear within cremation burials.

Sestieri and De Santis postulate that men, during the Latial period I, likely could assume high-status roles in religious, military, and political hierarchies, as male burials during this period often included both objects associated with political or military prestige—such as swords—and objects associated with religious significance, such as knives or statuettes. The archaeologists Anna Sestieri and Anna De Santis propose that the miniaturized funerary items of warrior burials were indicative of local "chiefs" belonging to social elite. However, Iaia suggests that these graves more likely reflected a cultural ideal rather than a specific social stratum, as—according to Iaia—they are too numerous to represent an exclusive class of prominent individuals. The presence of military equipment in male burials may indicate a perceived connection between war and masculinity within the Latial culture, although Venderbos suggests that such bellicose imagery may possess more metaphorical symbolism beyond a literal connection to warfare. For instance, Venderbos notes that—in other cultures—weapons may hold a prominent position within rituals or ceremonial garb, especially as—according to Venderbos—ornately decorated weaponry can highlight personal prestige. Venderbos further suggests that weapons may also often serve as symbolic representations of power or authority.

The primary high-status social positions offered to women may have been religious in nature, as knives—a cult item—were the primary high-status burial good incorporated within female graves. Sestieri notes that, in Osteria, the graves of nearly all girls younger than 12 years of age contain gendered items, whereas the graves of boys from the same age groups almost entirely lack markers of gender roles. Moreover, Sestieri argues that the presence of cult-related objects in the graves of subadult women indicates that these individuals received these ritual roles in youth. Other graves contain religious equipment which may further indicate that women could be tasked with religious roles from youth. For instance, one grave from San Lorenzo Vecchio belonging to a young girl around the age of twelve contains a hut urn and a statuette that itself is possibly posed as if it were performing a religious offering. This grave in particular may indicate that women could play an active role in religious rituals from a young age.

The distinction between "warrior" and "weaver" burials weakened during the Latial period II. "Warrior" type burials persisted into the IIA period, although they generally contained fewer miniature weapons, often only containing a spear and a lance. Although razors were almost always included in male burials dated to the Latial period I, there were few razors present in Latial period IIA1 male burials. However, the "warrior" type completely dissipated from the funerary record by the Latial period IIA2. Regular-sized razors and serpentine fibulae continued to appear in male burials, although weapons, corded jars, and miniature braziers largely vanished from such tombs. All female burials from the Latial period II and onwards contain a spindle whorl, perhaps indicating that the spindle whorl had come to merely signify that the deceased was female, rather than to convey any more complex gender identity or role in life.

Sestieri argues that, by the Latial period III, the representation of the different gender roles within the funerary record at Osteria had largely dissipated. Gender identity continued to be expressed in the funerary record through the interment of certain gender-specific articles of clothing. Female burials in Castel di Decima were marked by the presence of hair rings, a headdress with amber or glass-paste beads, and new types of fibulae—such as the boat fibulae, leech fibulae, or fibulae with an amber bow. Likewise, in Osteria and Caracupa, female burials are differentiated by the inclusion of hair rings and arch bow, leech, or boat fibulae. Men from Castel di Decima were often entombed with a short-sleeved tunic, an iron lance, a sword, and a mantle fastened to either the chest or the right shoulder by 1-2 serpentine fibulae. Some male burials from this cemetery contain buckles or hooks that Venderbos interprets as the remains of decayed belts. Male tombs from Osteria and Caracupa were marked by the inclusion of serpentine or dragon fibulae and the presence of weaponry.

== Trade ==
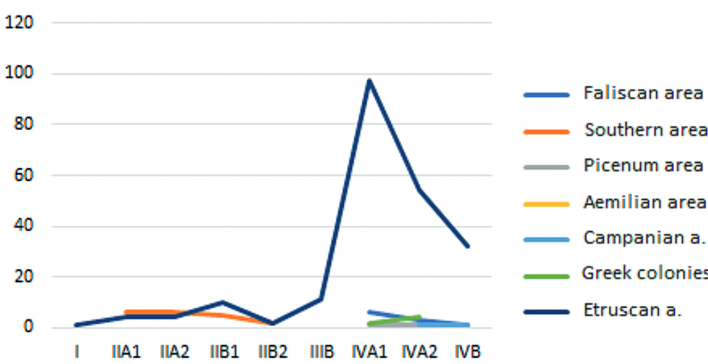
The number of imported objects across the Latial culture.

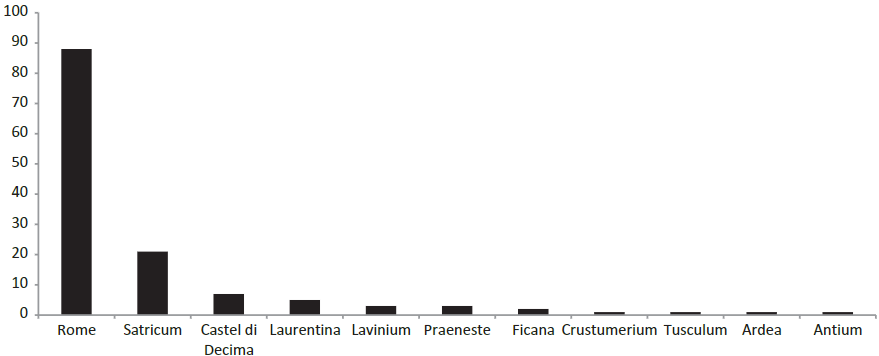
Distribution of Corinthian-style pottery across Old Latium.

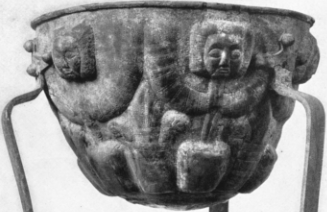
Bronze bowl from the Barberini Tomb that may have been imported.

Grave goods from the earlier Latial culture indicate contact with populations from Southern Italy, contact which likely continued during the later phases as graves from such periods include goods from Campania or the colonies of Magna Graecia. Excavations at a non-Latial cemetery in Carinaro, a town in Campania, unearthed a grave contemporaneous with the Latial period I that contained miniaturized burial goods and urns topped by roof-shaped lids, features which are reminiscent of Latial burial practices. Sestieri and De Santis suggest that these correspondences provide further attestation of contact between Latium and southern Italy. Fulminante argues that the Latial culture likely had contact with Spain during its earliest periods, noting the presence of a Latial period IIB2 grave containing an iron serpentine fibula that likely originated in Spain in Osteria, the appearance of multiple Latial period II objects from Spain in Gabii, and a Latial period IVA2 object from Spain in Acqua Acetosa Laurentina. Moreover, Fulminante cites the presence of Latial artifacts in Spain as further proof of trade links between the two regions.

Cosmetic items, such as perfume jars or amulets, and banqueting materials constituted the majority of imported materials during the Latial period III. The importance of banqueting items may have evolved due to the influence of the customs of various Eastern Mediterranean peoples, such as the significance of the Semitic practice of Marzēaḥ or the Ancient Greek symposium. Various tombs from Castel di Decima contain Levantine artifacts, such as one high-status female burial dated to around 850 BCE that includes a type of Levantine bowl. Two other Latial period III graves and another Latial period IVA tomb from the site included Levantine burial goods and various other tombs from the area contained Phoenician transport amphorae. The presence of such materials attests to potential connections between Decima and the Levant or with Phoenician–Punic Sardinia. Contact with Sardinia is further evidenced by the discovery of two bronze pins in Osteria that originate from the Nuragic culture.

It is impossible to ascertain the precise means by which these goods arrived in Latium, as the contemporaneous Orientalizing trade was conducted via pan-Mediterranean networks of commerce that allowed for such materials to pass through multiple merchants before reaching their destination. However, the presence of Eastern Mediterranean imports at coastal sites such as Castel di Decima or Satricum allows for the possibility of importation without Etruscan intermediaries. Nijboer concedes that it the ethnicity of the traders cannot be confidently determined, although he argues that direct trade between Phoenicians and Decima is evidenced by the long history of Near Eastern commerce across multiple periods at the site and the presence of Phoenician transport amphorae. Goods may also have been introduced into Central Italy from sites in Southern Italy via a Latial intermediary. Moreover, it is possible that many Orientalizing goods were manufactured by local craftsmen, some of whom may have been immigrants from the Greek world.

Graves at Castel di Decima, located on the via Ostiensis 10 miles (16 km) south of Rome date to Latial IV and show much more substantial dispersion in grave goods. Most inhumations were simple with no goods at all, but some of the wealthiest graves dated to the seventh century contained women dressed in rich garments adorned with amber and glass bead, gold and silvery fibulae, and ornamental silver wire. Occurrences of Etruscan material—such as bucchero pottery—at Latial sites increase during the IVA period, a phenomenon which the archaeologist Francesca Fulminante connects to the reigns of Tarquinius Priscus and Tarquinius Superbus, two legendary Roman kings who—according to Roman mythology—were Etruscan. The exact time period of their reigns is controversial, although it may be dated to the Latial period IVB.

== Religion ==
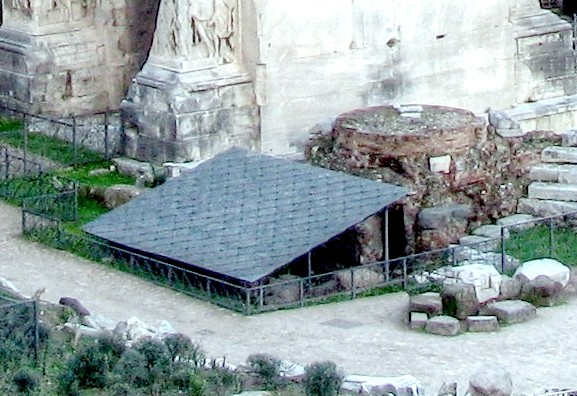
Cornell suggests that this site, the Altar of Saturn, may have once functioned as an open-air sanctuary.

Archaeological examination of votive deposits throughout West-Central Italy has proffered no evidence of any specific role that manmade buildings may have played in Latial religion. Latial religion, during the Final Bronze Age, was largely centered around open-air spaces—such as pits, rivers, springs, or lakes—which had supplanted the caverns of previous periods as the primary locus for cult sites. The disappearance of caves as cult sites occurred contemporaneously to the emergence of a new tradition wherein food items—most often cereals—were deposited within pits and ditches situated within settlement areas. Sacred springs also housed votive offerings of other objects, though pottery was the most common item deposited in these spaces. According to the Classical archaeologist Marianne Kleibrink, it is likely that worship of the numina—a type of spirit in Roman mythology—originated with open-air Latial cult sites. Kleibrink further connects these practices with Roman worship of water-deities, such as sacred spring of the nymph Egeria or the worship of Juturna. These open-air sites may have influenced the establishment of later settlements. For instance, the sacred spring of Laghetto del Monsignore—which is situated near Satricum—contains hundreds of miniature vases dating to the Bronze Age, indicating the area had already maintained a level of sociocultural significance to Latial settlers prior to the creation of Satricum.

Following the Early Iron Age, Latial religious activities largely shifted from open-air natural sites towards votive deposits located within villages, on the boundaries of settlements, or by necropolises. Fulminante suggests that the popularization of intramural religious sites may have stemmed from a desire by local aristocrats to increase their control over religious activity. Van Loon and de Haas argue that the shared cultural significance of sanctuaries allowed them to function as hubs for communal activity, and consequently to contribute to urban development in the region. For instance, the cult site at the acropolis of Satricum—which originated during the 9th-century BCE—likely spurred trade and economic activity, thereby allowing for the development of Satricum around its acropolis. In the 7th-century BCE, new sanctuaries emerged within or on the borders of Satricum, which Van Loon and de Haas explain as the result of increasing demand for ritual activity, itself explained as a consequence of urban development. However, not all sanctuary sites acquired surrounding urban centers: The site of Laghetto del Monsignore remained unpopulated, likely because its geographical conditions were not particularly conducive to settlement growth, unlike Satricum, which benefited from a nearby tuff plateau and river. It is likely that Laghetto del Monsignore remained prominent within the local society, as numerous artifacts deposited at the lake were most likely manufactured in Satricum.

According to Nijboer, Latial sanctuaries functioned as centers for economic activity. For instance, the earliest evidence of workshop activities at Satricum—dated to around 650 BCE—were initially centered around the central sanctuary by the acropolis. Nijboer argues that the religious authorities of the temple in Satricum may have played an important and active role in managing the local economy. It is possible, according to Nijboer, that the temple officials assessed the value of local currencies, as samples of scales and weights have been uncovered in votive deposits near the site. One weight, dated to the 7th-century BCE, weighs around 267 grams, which Nijboer relates to 273 gram Roman pound utilized in measurements of currency. Moreover, beginning in the 7th-century BCE, numerous votive deposits containing expensive goods such as gold or silver artifacts begin to appear in Satricum, indicating that their wealth was removed from circulation and deposited in the votive pits. Nijboer proposes that such a practice likely served to store surplus value and was probably performed at the behest of local sanctuaries, perhaps as a means of stockpiling wealth for the temple's benefit. According to Smith, it is possible that such monetary reserves helped finance the rapid construction of temples during the 6th-century BCE. Furthermore, these cult sites may have served as the predecessors to future fora, as—like fora—they offered religious, commercial, and communal functions. Additional evidence for a connection between fora and temples may derive from Gabii, where a forum may have been constructed on the basis of an earlier shrine to Juno. Cornell suggests that certain sanctuaries, such as the Temple of Diana in Rome, were established outside cities specifically for the purpose of inviting foreigners to intercommunal religious activities. Cornell further notes that many of the sanctuary sites located near harbors—such as the sanctuaries by Minturno or Ardea—were also dedicated to erotic deities, such as Aphrodite or Mater Matuta, which Cornell argues may attracted foreign merchants and therefore incentivized trade.

Based on the application of Thiessen polygons to the mapping of cult sites, the archaeologists Elisabeth van't Lindenhout and Jelle Bouma conclude that, although—during the 7th-century BCE—sacred sites were primarily situated within Latial communities, following the 7th-century BCE, Latial sanctuary sites shifted towards the borders between the polygons. Bouma and Lindenhout connect this development to the broader trend of increased territorial markers throughout the Latial culture, such as the increased building of settlement defenses (i.e. walls, ditches). These sites may connect to the controversial notion of border sanctuaries as territorial markers for the ancient ager Romanus.

=== Possible sacred huts ===
By the 8th-century BCE, a distinct type of religious building—the sacred hut—may have emerged within villages. Though, Potts argues that the identification of many of these huts as specifically sacred is not conclusively supported by the archaeological evidence, as there is a noticeable lack of religious material (i.e. votive objects) found within these spaces. However, finds of household materials—such as cooking equipment—are common, which itself could be interpreted as either evidence for a domestic function or an indication that domestic and religious rituals were similar. Potts concludes that there is no evidence for the existence of "sacred huts" as a specific and widespread class of religious site in ancient Latium, although Potts does allow for the possibility that certain huts with ritual functions did exist. If this hypothesis is accepted, then it may indicate that—within the Latial culture—there was little necessity to mark religious sites with distinctive features, or perhaps that any designs characteristic of Latial religious architecture were not capable of persisting in the archaeological record.

In many cases, potential sacred huts were situated nearby other areas of ritual activity, such as votive deposits. For instance, at Satricum, a votive deposit containing 20,000 artifacts dated between the 9th-6th centuries BCE was uncovered nearby the temple to Mater Matuta, which was itself built atop a hut constructed in the 9th-century BCE. Yet, according to Potts, this geographic proximity is not firm evidence that these huts were considered sacred within the Latial culture. Potts suggests various alternative possibilities regarding the function of these huts: They may have merely constituted houses located close to areas of religious activity, or perhaps they stored items connected to the aforementioned rituals. In Satricum, various Iron Age buildings—including a possibly sacred hut—were arranged in a semicircular pattern beside an artificial lake that was constructed in the 8th or 7th centuries BCE, possibly in the same area as a preexisting natural pool. If the hut is interpreted as a religious site and the lake as a former sacred spring, neither of which are universally accepted, this choice of hut location may provide evidence for the establishment of new cult sites in areas previously considered ritualistically significant. Such a concentric hut pattern was not necessarily unique to Satricum: Parallels may be found at the site of Ficana.

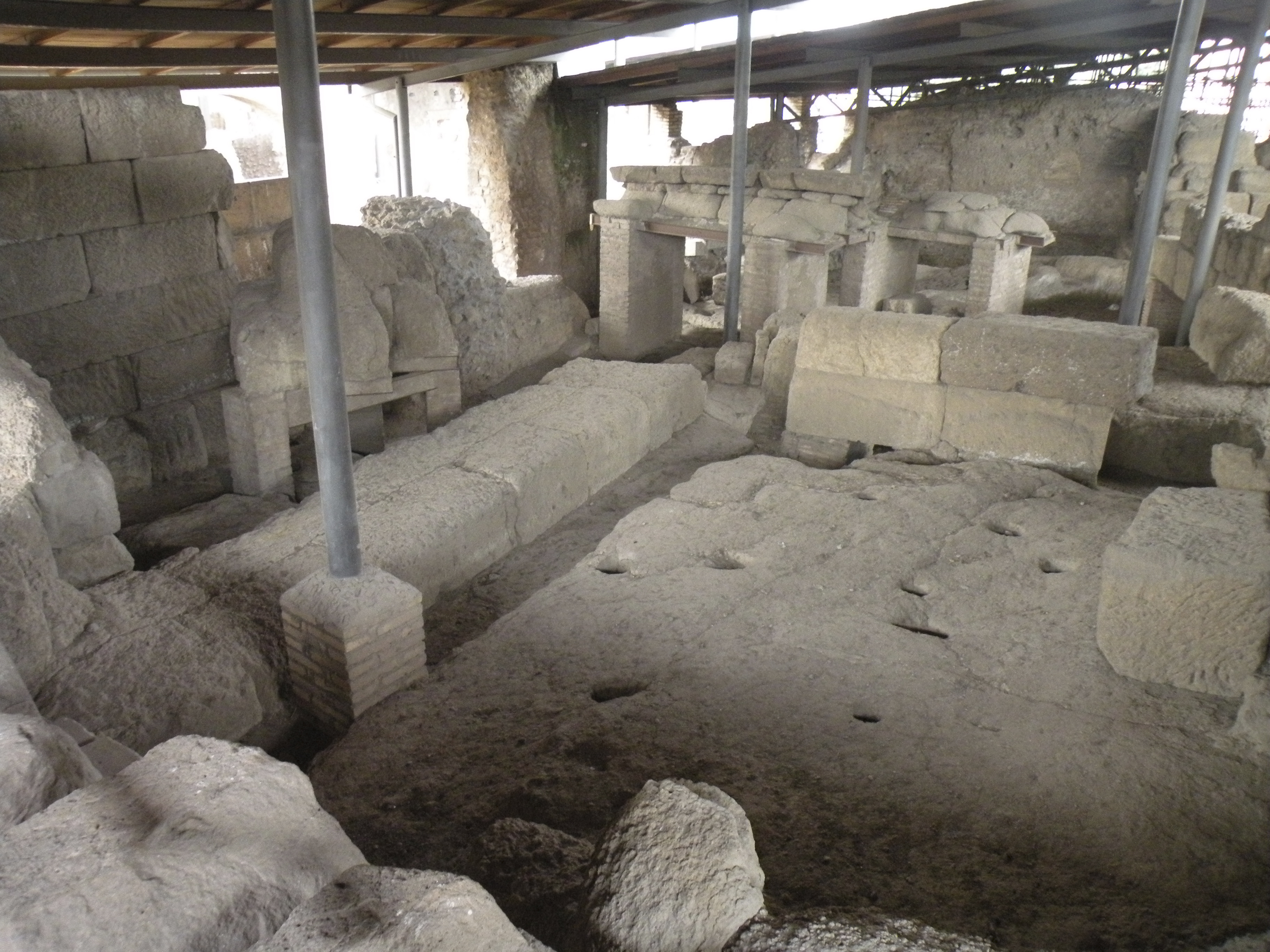
"House of Romulus" on the Palatine Hill.

Often, Latial huts served as the basis for later temples, which began to emerge around the 600s or 500s BCE. For example, the temples of Satricum and Velletri were constructed atop the remains of ancient Latial huts. In the case of Satricum, the underlying hut was not originally the largest structure in its vicinity, perhaps implying that the community did not consider this site to be the most deserving of land or resource investment, which itself may indicate that the hut was not the most prominent area in the settlement. It is possible that the later reuse of these huts for religious functions may indicate that the original structure likewise possessed ritual purposes, though Potts argues that the construction of a temple does not necessarily indicate that all prior structures in the same location were also sacred. Evidence from a hut in Ficana reveals the remains of cooking equipment above earlier layers marked by slags, indicating that the site had shifted purpose without requiring any change in layout or design. In the later Roman culture, there is also evidence for the reuse of nonritual land for sacred purposes, such as the Temple of Honos that was built near the Colline Gate.

Various ancient Roman authors reference ancient sacred huts, which may be connected to the sacred huts identified in the Latial culture. For instance, both Dionysius of Halicarnassus and Cassius Dio report the existence of a hut in Rome that supposedly belonged to Romulus. Although the existence of such a site has never been confirmed, archaeological research has revealed evidence for a set of huts on the Palatine Hill underneath the Temple of Magna Mater, which may relate to the fabled hut of Romulus. Moreover, Ovid claims that the Temple of Vesta once had thatched rooves, walls formed from willow, and a circular shape deliberately designed to imitate the Earth. However, the archaeologist Charlotte Potts suggests that the notion of an ancient sacred huts appears in various cultures as a literary motif associated with archaic traditions. For instance, Vitruvius writes that "shrines covered with straw" in the Capitolium, the Hut of Romulus, and in the Citadel can "signify the customs and the antiquities of Rome" and Lucretius associates the acquisition of "huts and skins of fire" with the growth of civilization. Thus, these descriptions of ancient huts may more accurately reflect artistic conceit rather than the architectural practices of Latial society.
