= Laghetto del Monsignore =

Lake in Italy

- Location: Campoverde, Lazio, Italy
- Coordinates: 41.5457°N 12.7362°E

Location
- Interactive map of Laghetto del Monsignore

The Laghetto del Monsignore is a lake and archaeological site located near Campoverde, Italy.

== Votive deposit ==
Votive dedications at Laghetto del Monsignore
| Object | Quantity |
|---|---|
| Impasto pottery | 3,743 |
| Etrusco-Corinthian | 3,016 |
| Bucchero | 2,743 |
| Miniature impasto | 1,590 |
| Lithic, stone | 75 |
| Bronze, iron, or lead | 68 |
| Amber, glass, faience | 68 |
| Bone | 46 |
| Attic pottery | 23 |
| Depurated ware | 22 |
| Other | 7 |

The lake served as a Latial open-air deposit from the 10th to the 5th centuries BCE. Votive deposits were first uncovered at the area in 1968. Large quantities of votive objects were abandoned in the lake and, given that limonite had formed on some of the items, it is likely they remained submersed for an extended period of time. Ceramics composed over 97% of the votive dedications at the site, although—among the total 11,401 items from the area—other amber, glass, or faience beads and bronze fibulae or sheets have also been uncovered. The samples of pottery from the lake include types of miniaturized biconical jars dated to the 10th-century BCE and miniature corded jars dated to the 9th-century BCE. Kleibrink notes that these miniaturized vessels were often modeled after standard-sized Latial pottery, leading her to argue that the specific ritual function of these votive objects was likely related to the vessel which they had imitated. Most of the material is dated to around the Late Orientalizing period—during the late 7th or early 6th centuries BCE—likely due to the increasing importation of Etrusco-Corinthian or bucchero objects, which were utilized in aristocratic banquets. Politically, the cult site at Monsignore likely fell under the influence of the sanctuary in the acropolis of Satricum by the 7th-century BCE. During this time, the pottery at Laghetto increasingly borrowed decoration patterns from styles found at Satricum, indicating a closer bond between the two sites than in previous periods.

== Social significance ==
According to Kleibrink, the site may have acquired cult significance due to its marshiness, an attribute to which Kleibrink assigns a degree of "liminality". Alternatively, the archaeologists Tanja von Loon and Tymon de Haas proposes that the site may have functioned as a central gathering point for various disparate pastoralist communities in Early Latium, as it is situated near multiple roads connected to grazing land and could have provided livestock with fresh water. Moreover, the pottery at Laghetto del Monsignore is similar to the pottery of other Latial sites, such as Satricum, which may attest to a shared cultural identity between these regions and, consequently, close links between the Monsignore cult site and other Latial areas. According to the archaeologist Alessandro Guidi, it is possible that the cult site of Monsignore may have influenced the eventual establishment of the nearby settlement of Satricum, as hundreds of artifacts from the lake deposited during the Bronze Age indicate the area already maintained a level of sociocultural significance to Latial settlers prior to the creation of Satricum.
