= Laurentino-Acqua Acetosa Nature Reserve =

Protected area in Italy

- Riserva Naturale Laurentino-Acqua Acetosa
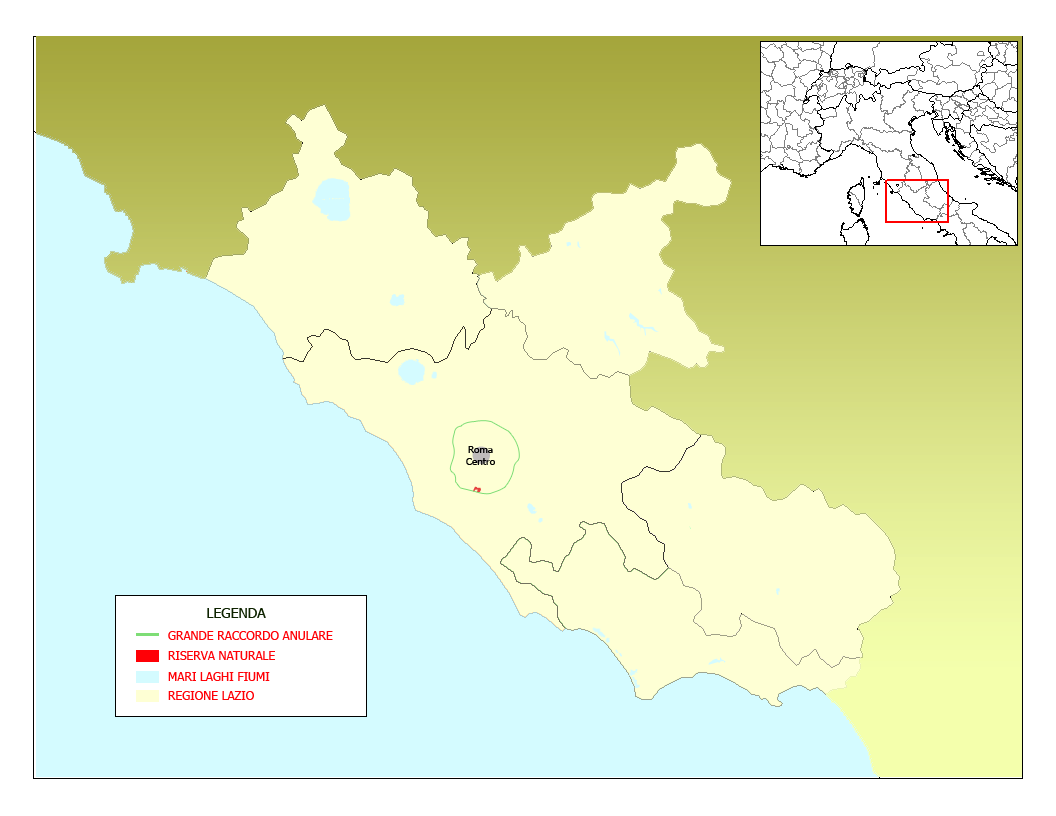
- Map of the Nature Reserve
- Location: Rome, Italy
- Nearest city: Rome
- Coordinates: 41.809°N 12.468°E
- Area: 1.68 km^{2} (0.65 sq mi)
- Established: 6 October 1997 (Regional Law no. 29)
- Governing body: RomaNatura – Regional body for the management of the system of protected natural areas in the Municipality of Rome

The Laurentino-Acqua Acetosa nature reserve is a protected natural area located in the Province of Rome.

It occupies an area of 273 hectares in the zone of Rome Fonte Ostiense and is classified by the Municipality of Rome as an "intermediate value area".

== Territory ==
The nature reserve, whose soil consists mainly of tuff, is spread on the slopes of the Latium Volcano and occupies three little valley floors (in Italian fosso, meaning "ditch"): from north to south Fosso del Ciuccio, Fosso dell'Acqua Acetosa and Fosso del Vallerano. The first two streams reach the Vallerano downstream of the hamlet il Castellaccio (after Via Cristoforo Colombo), a few hundred meters before it flows into the Tiber.

The first ditch, heavily urbanized, is the axis around which the Laurentino 38 ring road develops. It is partially equipped for leisure.

In the second ditch the use of the territory is varied, since there are both residential and agricultural areas. Its peculiarity derives from the presence, in the eastern part, of the Acqua Acetosa Ostiense archeological area and, at the south-eastern edge, of the San Paolo mineral water source.

The third ditch shows the characteristics of an agricultural valley and has kept the appearance conferred by the hydraulic reclamation carried out in the 1930s.

== Fauna ==
In the freshwater streams that cross the Reserve live the river crab (Potamon fluviatile), the frog (Rana), the toad (Bufo bufo) and the newt (Triturus). Among the reptiles, there is the grass snake (Natrix natrix), as well as the green whip snake (Hierophis viridiflavus), the lizard (Lacertilia), the gecko (Tarentola mauritanica). The nocturnal fauna includes Foxes (Vulpes vulpes), Common pipistrelles (Pipistrellus pipistrellus), Crested porcupines (Hystrix cristata) and Hedgehogs (Erinaceus europaeus). Among the raptors, which often nest in the numerous farmhouses of the Reserve, there are the kestrel (Falco tinnunculus), the little owl (Athene noctua) and the peregrine falcon (Falco peregrinus). Finally, the Reserve hosts several species of birds, including the grey heron (Ardea cinerea), the common moorhen (Gallinula chloropus), the hoopoe (Upupa epops), the nightingale (Luscinia megarhynchos) and the common pheasant (Phasianus colchicus). The presence of the barn owl (Tyto alba) has been signaled.

== Flora ==
In the Reserve grow holm oak (Quercus ilex) and downy oak (Quercus pubescens) woods, as well as Willows (Salix), poplars (Populus), eucalyptus (Eucalyptus). The area shows a modest forest cover, modified by the intense agricultural use and by the surrounding urbanization, but with good chance of recovery.

== Places of interest ==
The name Acqua Acetosa (or Acquacetosa or Acqua Cetosa) is due to the presence of the ditch of Acqua Acetosa, a tributary stream of the Vallerano, in turn a left tributary of the Tiber, otherwise known as Acqua Acetosa Ostiense, to distinguish it from another stream with the same name in the quarter Parioli.

Roughly at kilometer 8 of the Via Laurentina there is a source of sulfur mineral water. The source, known to the ancient Romans, was probably used for therapeutic purposes. This water was sold by street vendors known as Acquacetosari. In 1937 a plant for the bottling and sale of the water was installed; the plant, called "Fonte S. Paolo", is currently closed sine die, due to pollution of the acquifer.

Probably this source was already used in protohistoric times, since a settlement – maybe the ancient Tellenae – developed on the plateau overlooking the ditch and the source of Acqua Acetosa. In 1976 the village and the nearby necropolis were protected with the establishment of the archaeological area of Acqua Acetosa, which however is not part of the Nature Reserve.

== Issues ==
The area included in the Reserve is one of the smallest (152 hectares, then increased up to 273) and the most degraded in the Province of Rome. Biodiversity is reduced to just few floral and faunal species, mainly anthropophilic. The agricultural areas are those that maintain an appearance more similar to that preceding the massive building expansion.

As for the archaeological site, this is closed to the public – although it falls within the redevelopment area of the Reserve – since it is under the exclusive control of the Archaeological Superintendence of Rome. This patch of land of a few hectares is actually a crucial knot to untie for a coherent development of the Reserve, since, in addition to Roman antiquities, it includes the 17th-century casale of San Sisto, the old bottling plant of Fonte San Paolo, the Judicial Deposit and an unofficial landfill.
