= Valvisciolo =

Archaeological site in Lazio, Italy

Valvisciolo is a historical location in Latium, Italy, close to Sermoneta and Latina. Known mainly for the Valvisciolo Abbey, this locality also includes important archaeological remains of a prehistoric, hillside settlement at the Valvisciolo/Caracupa site. The site is a terraced settlement utilizing megalithic architecture, perhaps in technical terms an early predecessor of the more developed polygonal masonry of the later first millennium BC. Occupation on the site ends in the sixth century BC, with local populations perhaps shifting to the Latin city of Norba which was incorporated as a Latin colonia by 492 BCE, according to the textual tradition, mainly based on the historian Livy.
