= ARPA =

Arpa or ARPA may refer to:

== Given name ==
- Arpa Ke'un (died 1336), Ilkhan during the disintegration of the Mongol state in Persia

== Surname ==
- José Arpa (1858–1952), Spanish artist who worked in Spain, Mexico, and Texas
- Okay Arpa (born 1977), Turkish karateka
- Yvan Arpa, Swiss watch designer

== Geographical names ==
- Areni, formerly Arpa, a village in Armenia
- Arpi, Armenia, also known as Arpa, a town in Armenia
- Arpa (river), in Armenia
- Arpa (river), Chhattisgarh in Chhattisgarh, India
- Akhurian River, Arpa in Turkish, river in Turkey and Armenia
- Arpa Darreh, a village in Iran
- Arpa Valley, a high-altitude valley in Kyrgyzstan

== Music ==
- Arpa d'Eolo, a musical instrument
- Arpa jarocha, a Mexican harp used in conjunto jarocho music
- Rinaldo dall'Arpa (died 1603), Italian composer, singer, and harpist

== Acronym ==
- Advanced Research Projects Agency, former name of the US Defense Advanced Research Projects Agency
- ARPA-E, the Advanced Research Projects Agency-Energy, an agency created in 2007 within the US Department of Energy
- ARPA-H, the Advanced Research Projects Agency for Health, an organization created in 2022 within the US National Institutes of Health
- ARPA-I, the Advanced Research Projects Agency for Infrastructure, an organization created in 2022 within the US Department of Transportation
- HSARPA, the Homeland Security Advanced Research Projects Agency, an agency within the Science and Technology Directorate at the US Department of Homeland Security
- IARPA, the Intelligence Advanced Research Projects Activity, an organization within the US Office of the Director of National Intelligence
- .arpa (address and routing parameter area), a top-level domain in the Domain Name System of the Internet
- Aerolíneas Paraguayas, a former Paraguayan airline
- Agenzie Regionali per la Protezione Ambientale, the Italian Regional Environmental Protection Agency
- Amazon Region Protected Areas Program, an initiative to expand protection of the Amazon rainforest in Brazil
- American Rescue Plan Act of 2021, an economic stimulus program of the United States
- Archaeological Resources Protection Act of 1979, a federal law of the United States
- Arctic Research and Policy Act of 1984 (amended 1990)
- Automatic radar plotting aid, a capability of some marine radar systems
- Average revenue per account, a metric similar to average revenue per user

== Other uses ==
- Arpa Yeghegnadzor, an inactive Armenian football club
- Arpa şehriye, Turkish for orzo

== See also ==
- Biomedical Advanced Research and Development Authority (BARDA)
- Arpa Chai (disambiguation)
