= Strada statale 148 Pontina =

State highway in Italy

State Highway 148
- Strada statale 148
- Pontina
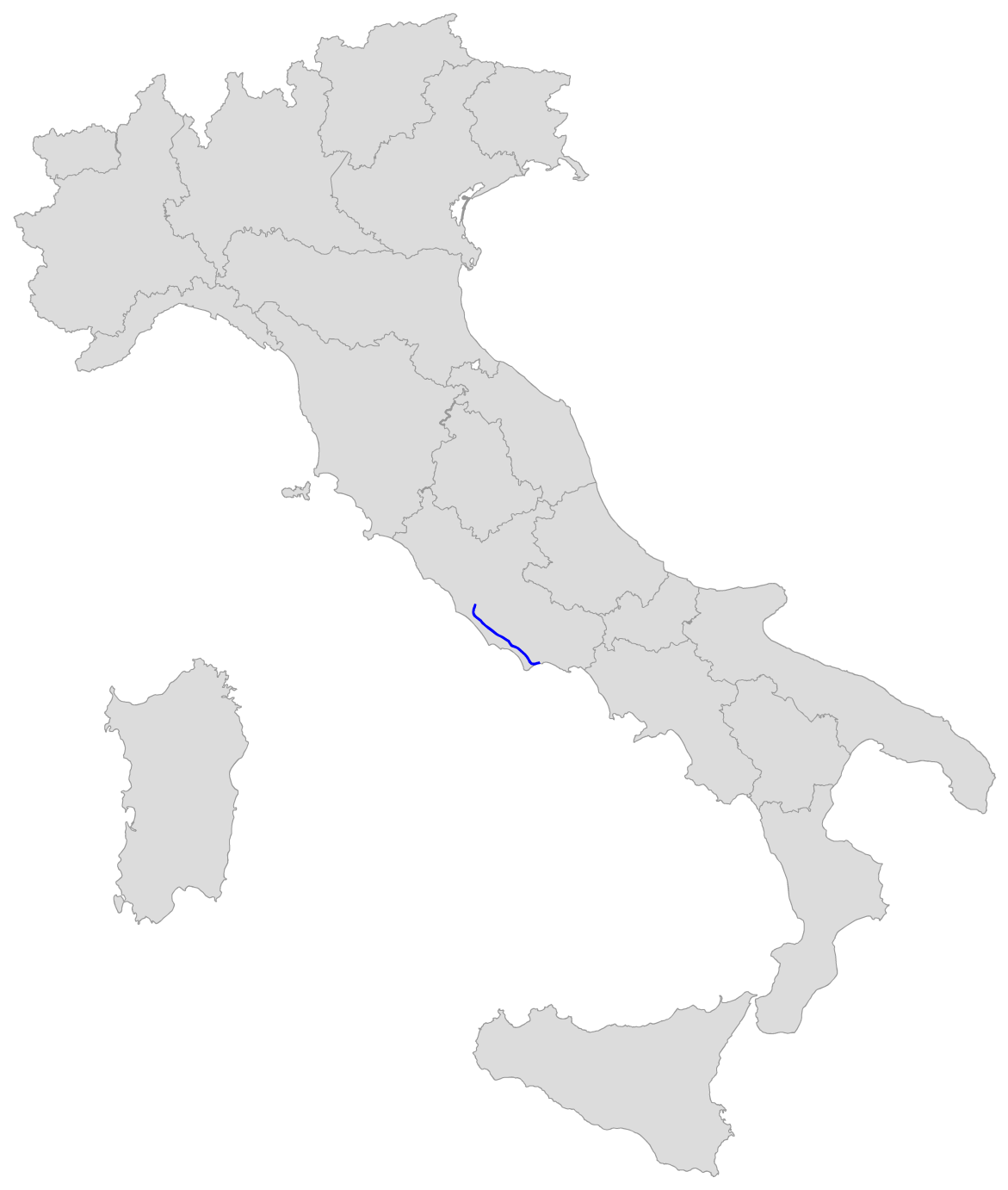

Route information
- Maintained by ANAS
- Length: 109.2 km (67.9 mi)
- Time period: 1950-2002, 2019-

Major junctions
- From: Rome
- To: Terracina

Location
- Country: Italy
- Regions: Lazio

Highway system
- Roads in Italy; Autostrade; State; Regional; Provincial; Municipal
← SS 145 var	→ SS 153

Strada statale 148 Pontina (SS 148), previously known as Strada regionale 148 Pontina (SR 148), is an Italian state highway 109.2 kilometres (67.9 mi) long in Italy in the region of Lazio that connects Rome to Terracina, passing through Latina and through the localities of Pomezia, Ardea in the Metropolitan City of Rome and for Aprilia, Pontinia and Sabaudia in province of Latina.

== History ==
Traced on the route of the ancient via Pontina or via Severiana, the northern section, between Rome and Borgo Piave (LT), was built in the forties and inaugurated in 1950. The southern section, between Borgo Piave and Terracina, was built between the sixties and seventies with the name of "via Mediana", integrating and expanding the existing road network, including in particular a large part of the reclamation road called "via Lunga" built in the thirties for the reclamation of the Agro Pontino.

In 1998 the government decided to devolve to the Regions all the state roads that were not considered of "national importance". The list of those roads, compiled in 2000, defined the state road nr. 148 of "regional interest", and therefore it was devolved to the Lazio region effectively from 1 February 2002, which then devolved the competences to the provinces of Rome and Latina for the relevant sections; from 5 March 2007, the management was entrusted to ASTRAL S.P.A.; from 21 January 2019 management has returned to ANAS.

== Route ==
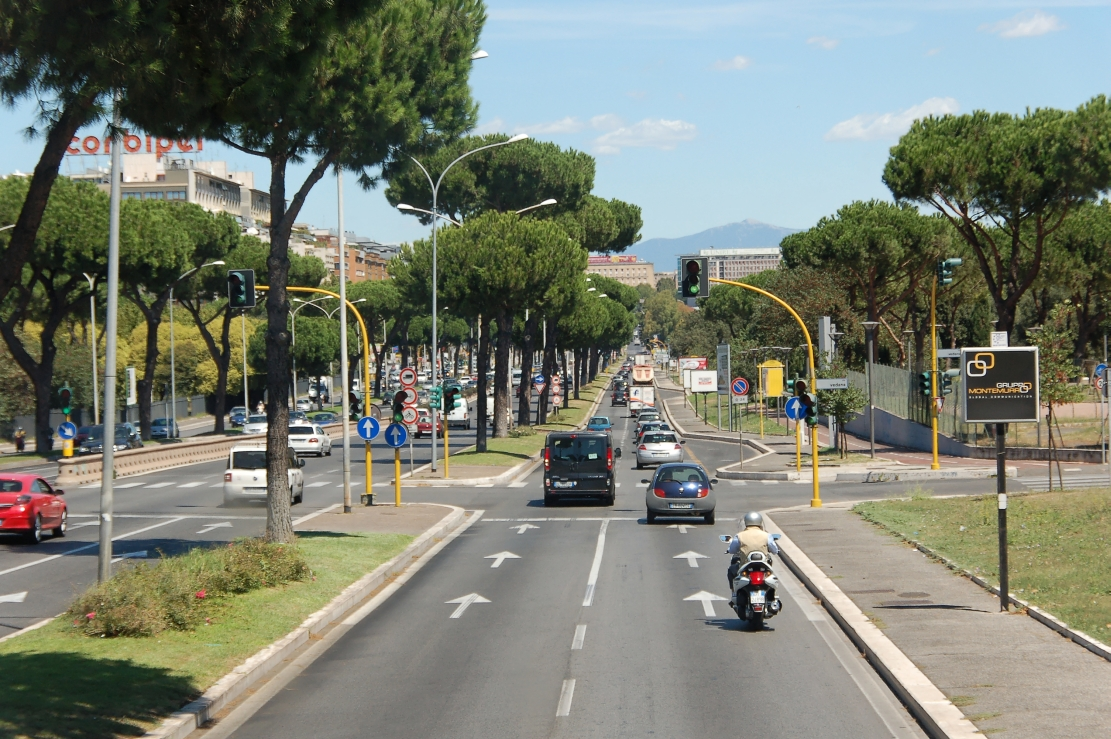
Via Cristoforo Colombo

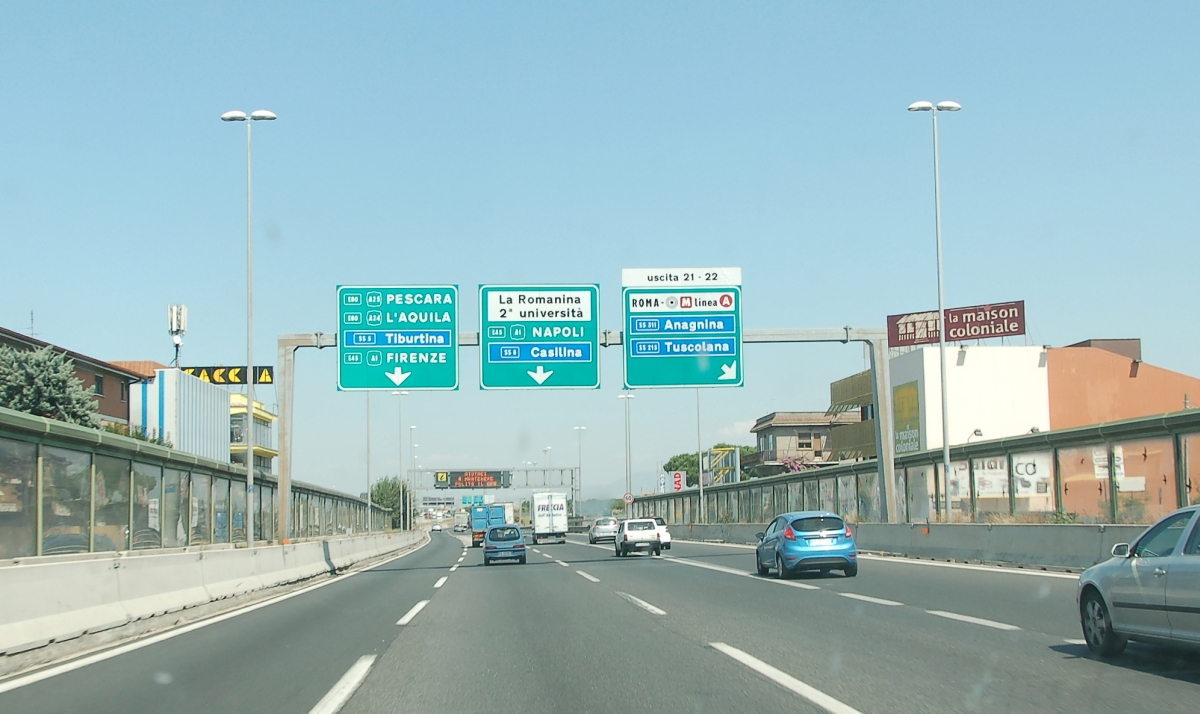
The Grande Raccordo Anulare

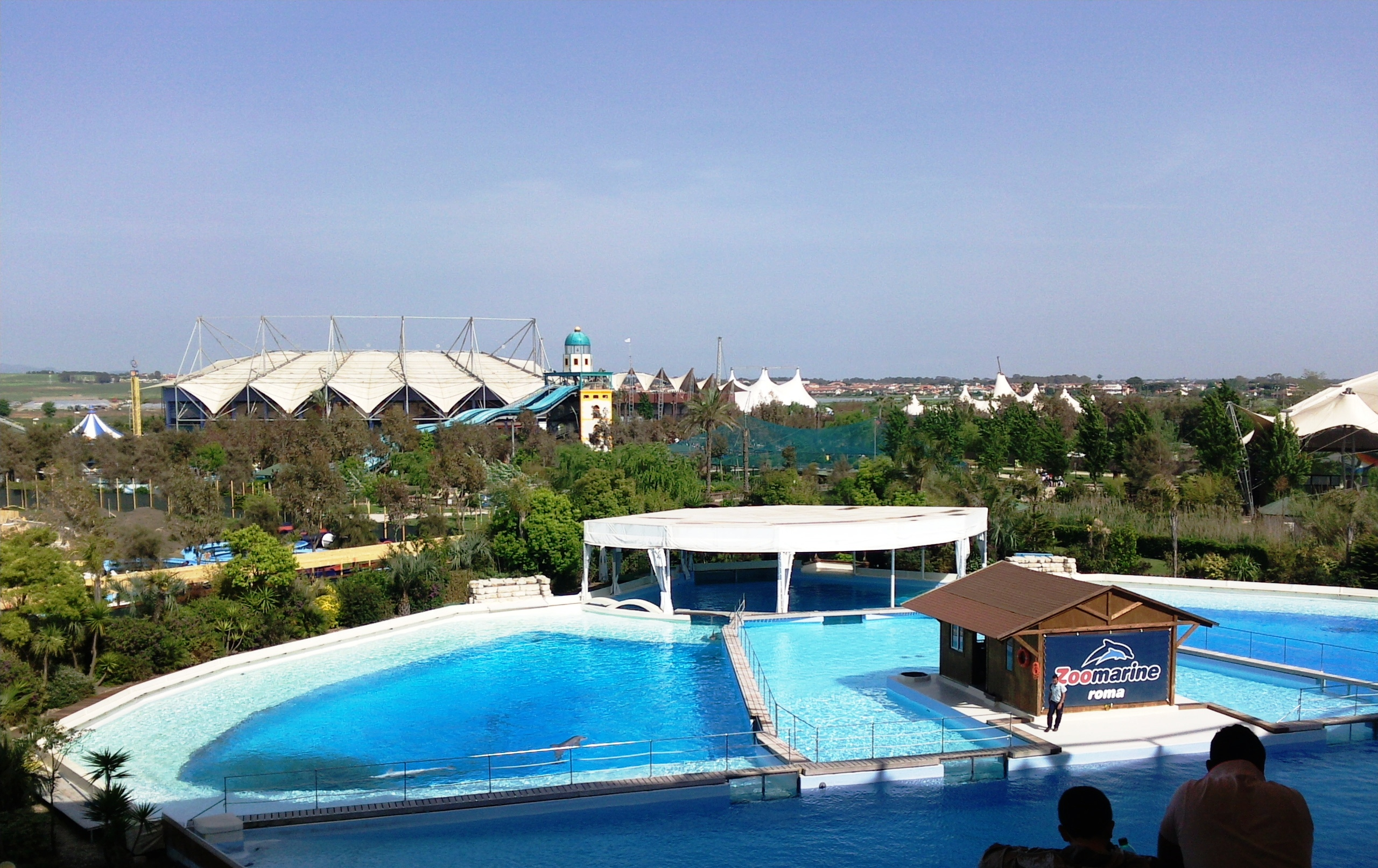
Zoomarine

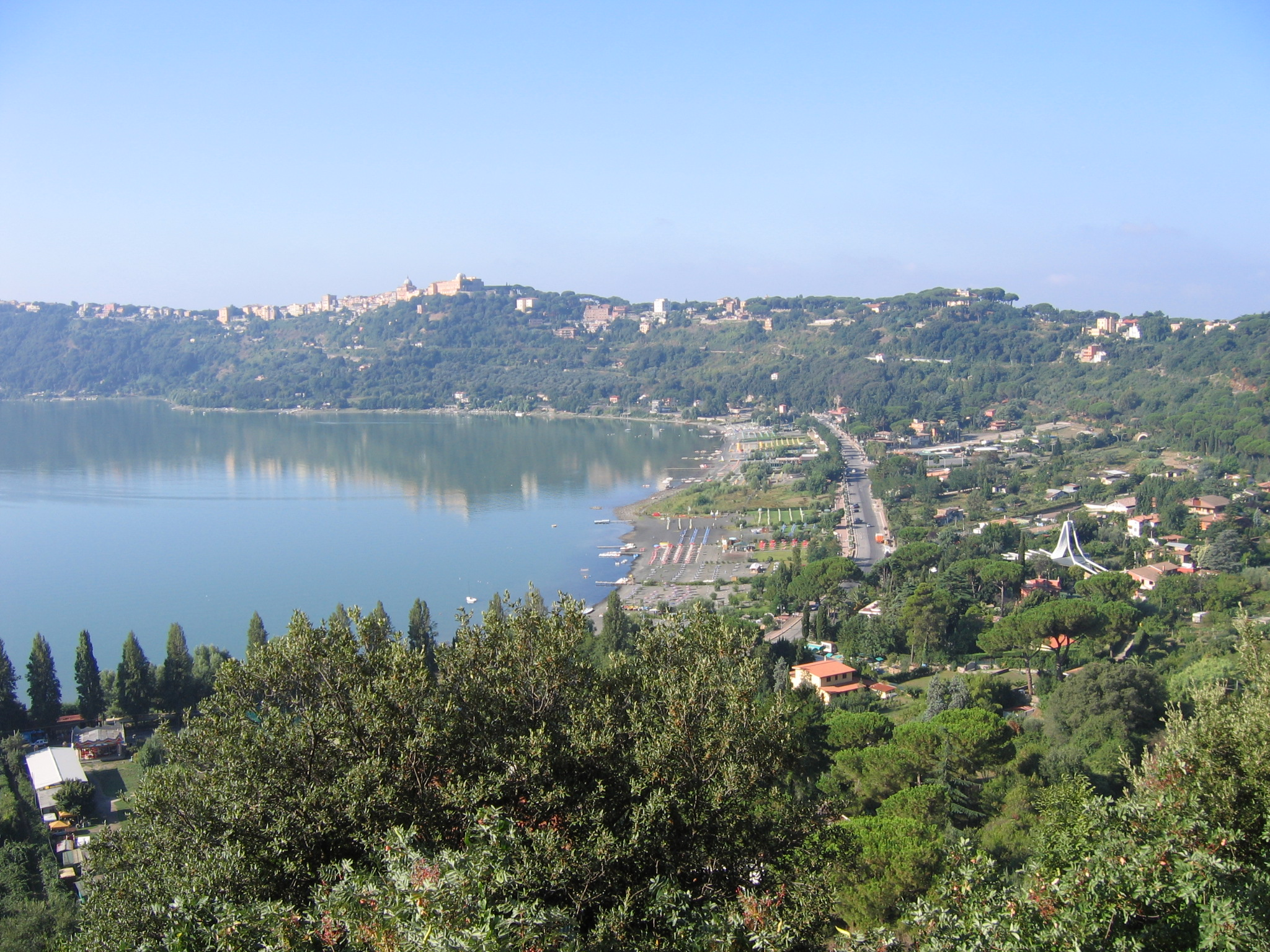
View of Castelli Romani

Via Pontina
Exit	Province
Via Cristoforo Colombo	RM
Via di Acqua Acetosa - Ostiense; Via Laurentina - Via Cristoforo Colombo	RM
Grande Raccordo Anulare	RM
Spinaceto - Mostacciano; Commercial area	RM
Tor de' Cenci; Spinaceto sud	RM
Castel di Decima; Tor de' Cenci sud	RM
Torvajanica - Pratica di Mare; Zoomarine	RM
Castel Romano; Consortium agglomeration	RM
Via della Comunella	RM
Pomezia; Torvajanica	RM
Pomezia; Castelli Romani	RM
Torvajanica; Pomezia sud	RM
Maggiona	RM
Via Pontina Vecchia	RM
Via Laurentina; Via Pontina Vecchia – Ardea	RM
Ardea	RM
Ardea; Via Ardeatina; Casalazzara	LT
Via Apriliana	LT
Via del Tufetto	LT
Via Vallelata – Via Fossignano	LT
Via delle Valli – Via della Riserva Nuova	LT
Via Isarco	LT
Anzio – Nettuno	LT
Aprilia; Via Appia	LT
Montarelli; Multiplex	LT
Aprilia; Via Mascagni – Via del Commercio – Borgata Agip	LT
Aprilia; Viale Europa	LT
Stadio; Via dei Giardini	LT
U-turn	LT
Nettuno - Via Campana; Torre del Padiglione – Campo di Carne	LT
Nettuno–Velletri; Campoverde nord	LT
Campoverde "Flower Market" Fair	LT
Nettuno – Anzio; Le Ferriere; U-turn	LT
Strada provinciale Cisterna–Nettuno; Borgo Montello	LT
Borgo Bainsizza; Borgo Podgora	LT
Piattaforma Logistica Integrata; Dogana – Latina Scalo	LT
Cisterna di Latina; Borgo Sabotino	LT
Borgo Santa Maria	LT
Istituto statale Agrario; ARPA Lazio	LT
Via Pontina; Sabaudia – San Felice Circeo – Terracina	LT
Latina	LT

== See also ==
- State highways (Italy)
- Roads in Italy
- Transport in Italy

=== Other Italian roads ===
- Autostrade of Italy
- Regional road (Italy)
- Provincial road (Italy)
- Municipal road (Italy)
