= 1603 in music =

The year 1603 in music involved some significant events.

== Events ==
- January 1 – Francesco Soriano is appointed maestro di cappella at St. Peter's Basilica, replacing Asprilio Pacelli
- Orlando Gibbons becomes a member of the Chapel Royal.
- Giovanni Artusi attacks the "crudities" and "licence" in the works of Claudio Monteverdi.
- Sebastian Aguilera de Heredia leaves his post as organist of Huesca Cathedral to become maestro de música at La Seo Cathedral in Saragossa.
- Asprilio Pacelli is appointed maestro di capella for King Sigismund III of Poland.

== Publications ==
- Agostino Agazzari
  - Sacrae laudes... liber secundus (Rome: Aloysio Zannetti)
  - Sacrarum cantionum... liber tertius (Rome: Aloysio Zannetti)
- Gregor Aichinger
  - Liturgica sive sacra officia, ad omnes dies festos Magnae Dei Matris per annum celebrari solitos (Augsburg: Johannes Praetorius)
  - Vespertinum Virginis canticum sive Magnificat... (Augsburg: Johannes Praetorius)
  - Ghirlanda di canzonette spirituali, for three voices (Augsburg: Johannes Praetorius)
- Costanzo Antegnati – Book 14: Missa Borromea, motets, and French chansons for three choirs (Venice: Angelo Gardano)
- Adriano Banchieri – Fantasie o vero canzoni alla francese for organ and other musical instruments, for four voices (Venice: Ricciardo Amadino)
- Giulio Belli – Psalmi ad vesperas in totius anni festivitatibus (Vespers psalms for the feasts of the whole year) for six voices (Venice: Angelo Gardano), also includes three Magnificats
- Sethus Calvisius – Tricinia for three voices or instruments (Leipzig: Abraham Lamberg for Jacob Apel), a collection of sacred songs in German
- Giovanni Croce – Devotissime Lamentationi et Improperii per la Settimana Santa for four voices (Venice: Giacomo Vincenti), music for Holy Week
- John Dowland – The third and last booke of songs or aires (London: Peter Short for Thomas Adams)
- Johannes Eccard – HochzeitLied (Lasst uns singen) for four voices (Königsberg: Georg Osterberger), a wedding song
- Christian Erbach – Mele sive cantiones sacrae ad modum canzonette ut vocant for four voices (Augsburg: Johann Praetorius)
- Achille Falcone – Madrigals for five voices (Venice: Giacomo Vincenti), published posthumously
- Stefano Felis – Second book of masses for six voices (Venice: Giacomo Vincenti)
- Melchior Franck
  - Opusculum for four voices (Nuremberg: Konrad Baur), a collection of secular partsongs
  - Neuer Pavanen, Galliarden, unnd Intraden for four, five, and six voices (Coburg: Justus Hauck)
  - Noch ein ander Quodlibet dem Herrn Marx Weisen for four voices (Coburg: Justus Hauck)
- Bartholomäus Gesius – Enchiridium etlicher deutschen und lateinischen Gesengen for four voices (Frankfurt an der Oder: Friedrich Hartmann)
- Carlo Gesualdo – Sacrarum cantionum liber primus, 2 vols. (Naples: Costantino Vitale)
- Claude Le Jeune – Le printemps (The Spring) for two, three, four, five, six, seven, and eight voices (Paris: the widow of R. Ballard and his son Pierre Ballard), a collection of airs, published posthumously
- Carolus Luython – Selectissimum sacrarum cantionum for six voices (Prague: Georg Nigrinus), a collection of motets)
- Ascanio Mayone – Il Primo libro di diversi capricci per sonare (Naples: Costantino Vitale), a collection of keyboard music
- Rogier Michael – Introitus Dominicorum dierum ac praecipuorum festorum for five voices (Leipzig: Abraham Lamberg), a collection of motets
- Claudio Monteverdi – Il quatro libro de madrigali a cinque voci di Claudio Monteverdi Maestro della Musica del Ser.mo Sig.r Duca di Mantova (Fourth book of madrigals for five voices) (Venice: Ricciardo Amadino)
- Pomponio Nenna – Fifth book of madrigals for five voices (Naples: Giovanni Battista Sottile)
- Giovanni Pierluigi da Palestrina — Cantiones sacrae, published posthumously (Antwerp: Pierre Phalèse)
- Benedetto Pallavicino – First book of masses (Venice: Ricciardo Amadino)
- Tomaso Pecci
  - Musicae modi in responsoria divini officii feria quarta, quinta & sexta, Sanctae Hebdomadae (Venice: Giacomo Vincenti)
  - First book of canzonettas for three voices (Venice: Giacomo Vincenti), also contains one piece by Giulio Giuliani
- Peter Philips – Second book of madrigals for six voices (Antwerp: Pierre Phalèse)
- Orfeo Vecchi
  - First book of Magnificats for five voices (Milan: Agostino Tradate)
  - First book of motets for four voices (Milan: Agostini Tradate)
  - Cantiones sacrae for six voices (Antwerp: Pierre Phalèse)

== Classical music ==
- Tomás Luis de Victoria – Officium Defunctorum, composed for the funeral obsequies of Maria of Austria, Holy Roman Empress, performed on April 22 and 23

== Opera ==
- none listed

== Births ==
- March 18 – King John IV of Portugal, composer, patron of music and the arts, and writer on music (died 1656)
- November – Francesco Foggia, composer (died 1688)
- date unknown
  - Denis Gaultier, French lutenist and composer (died 1672)
  - William Smith, liturgical composer (died 1645)
- probable – Benedetto Ferrari, composer and theorbo player (died 1681)

== Deaths ==
- June – Baldassare Donato, composer and singer (born 1525–1530)
- July 4 – Philippe de Monte, Flemish composer (born 1521)
- August 2 – Rinaldo dall'Arpa, composer, singer and harpist
- August 16 – Cardinal Silvio Antoniani, amateur musician (born 1540)
- September 25 – Stefano Felis, Neapolitan composer and music teacher (born c.1538)
- October 23 – Johann Wanning, Dutch-born composer, kapellmeister and alto singer (born 1537)
- date unknown – Ambrosio Cotes, Spanish composer (born c.1550)
