= Arpaçay (disambiguation) =

Arpaçay is a town and a district of Kars Province in the Eastern Anatolia region of Turkey.

Arpaçay or Arpa çay or Arpachay may also refer to:

- Arpaçay, Azerbaijan
- Arpaçay River or the Akhurian River, a river in the South Caucasus.
- Arpaçay Dam, a dam in Armenia and Turkey

== See also ==
- Arpa Chai (disambiguation)
