= Arpa Chai =

Arpa Chai or Arpa Chay or Arpachay or Arpachayi (Persian: ارپاچايي) may refer to:

- Arpa Chai, Ardabil
- Arpachayi, West Azerbaijan
- Arpa-Chay, or Arpachay, or Akhurian River

== See also ==
- Arpaçay (disambiguation)
