= Zoomarine =

Amusement park in Torvaianica, Rome, Italy

Zoomarine ROME - Italy
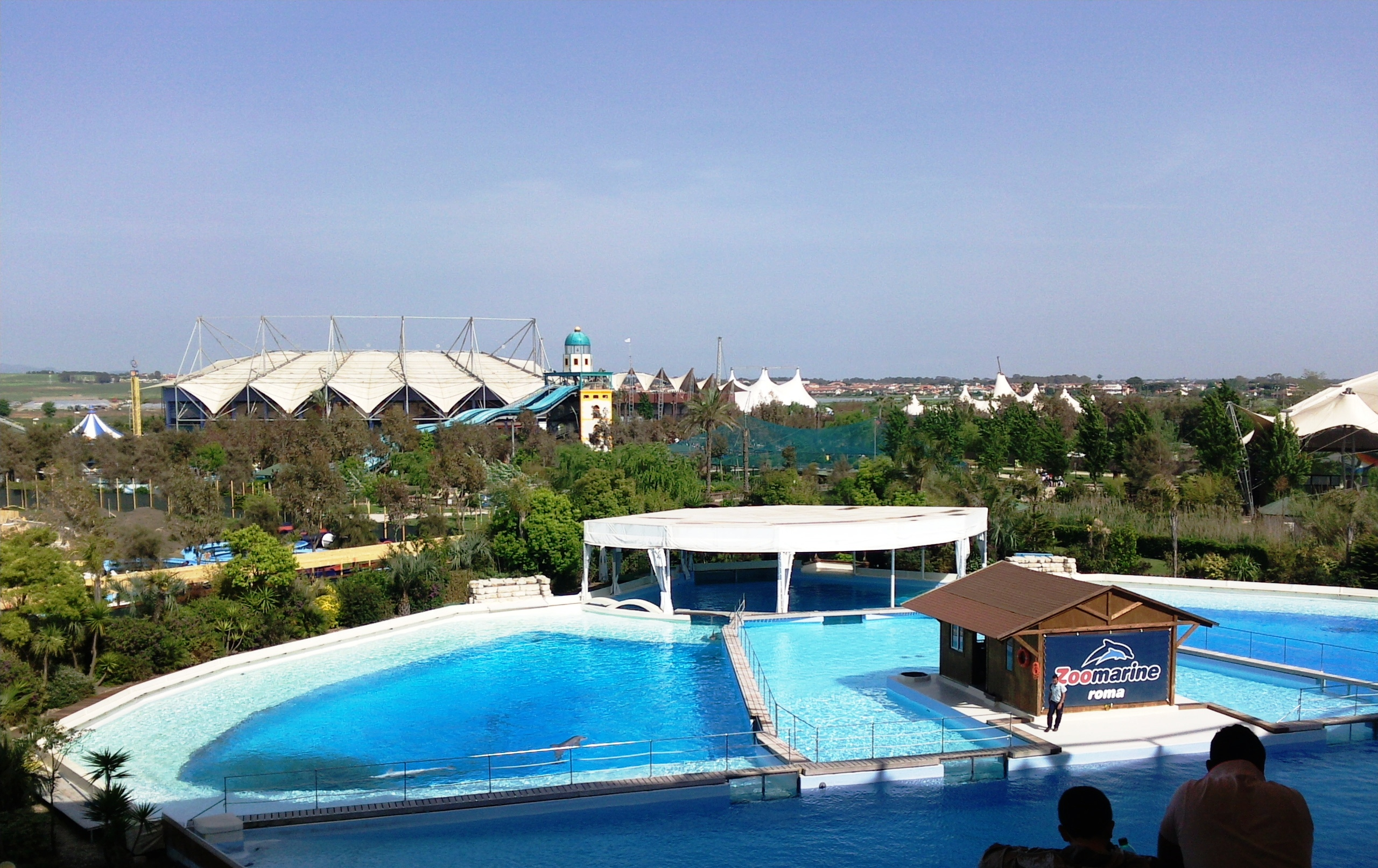
- The view of the park from the Dolphin Discovery Stadium.
- Interactive map of Zoomarine ROME - Italy
- Location: Torvajanica, Rome, Italy
- Coordinates: 41°38′01″N 12°27′24″E
- Opened: September 2005
- Owner: Dolphin Discovery
- Theme: Amusement park, water park, dolphinarium, zoo
- Operating season: Spring-Summer-Autumun
- Attendance: 400,000
- Area: 40,000 m^{2} (9.9 acres)
- Website: Official website

Zoomarine Rome-Italy is a zoological park, oceanarium, amusement park and water park, located in Lazio, southwest of Rome, in Torvajanica, Pomezia. Inaugurated in September 2005, it is owned by Dolphin Discovery from August 2015. It includes one of three Italian dolphinariums, with a dedicated area "Island of dolphins".

Zoomarine Rome-Italy is mainly a zoological park, it has several zoological areas divided by category, where you can admire educational demonstrations of dolphins, pinnipeds and sea lions, tropical and aquatic birds and penguins, but also includes water park and theme park attractions, with a total area of 40,000 m^{2}. It counts 22 attractions.

On March 31, 2025, The Dolphin Company, current owner of Zoomarine Rome-Italy, filed for Chapter 11 bankruptcy protection to deal with its debt and financial challenges.

== Attractions ==
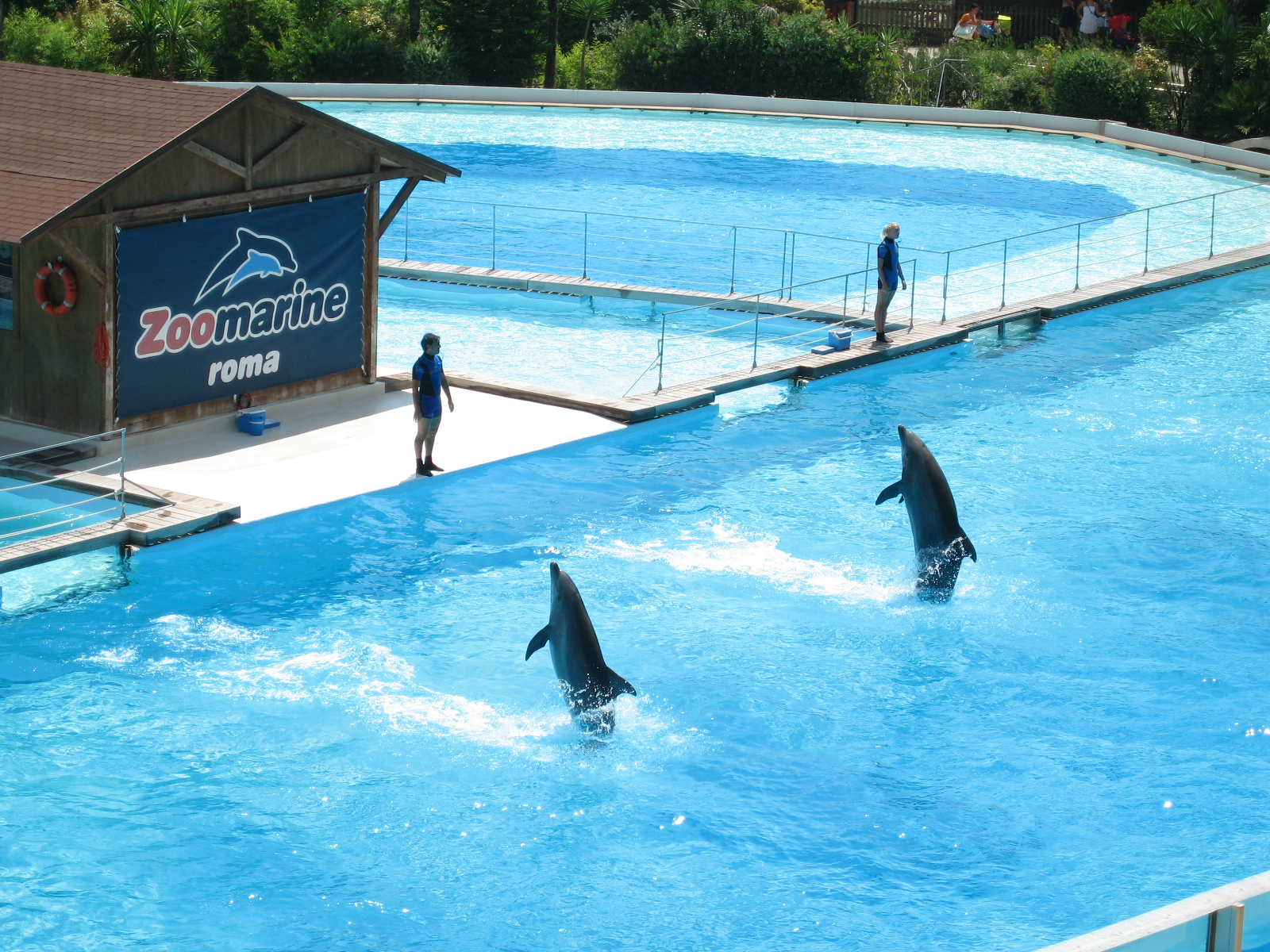
The dolphin show

=== Current Attractions ===
The park has 22 operating attractions, listed in chronological order of opening to the public. In brackets, the year of opening.

- Blue River (2005), Log Flume.
- Carousel (2005), Flat Ride.
- Harakiri (2005), Slide.
- Eureka (2005), Flat Ride.
- Mini Octopus (2005), Flat Ride.
- Octopus (2005), Flat Ride.
- Little farm train (2005), little train.
- Cinema 4D (2009), Cinema 4D.
- Playground Cinema 4D (2009), Playground.
- Age of the Dinosaurs (2011), Dark Ride.
- Shark (2011), Junior Coaster.
- Pirate Lagoon (2012), Splash Battle.
- Hawaii (2016), Aquatic Playground. Until 2017 it was identified with the name of Acqua Splash.
- Flow Rider (2016), Flow Rider. Until 2017 it was identified with the name of Surf.
- Formula Segway (2017), Path inside the park.
- Flight of the Hawk (2017), Zipline.
- Pirate Cove (2017), Children's pool.
- Cursed Galleon (2018), Horror House.
- Land of Dragons (2018), Dark Ride.
- Free Fall (2019), Inflatable.
- Camelot (2022), Playground

==== Current attractions gallery ====
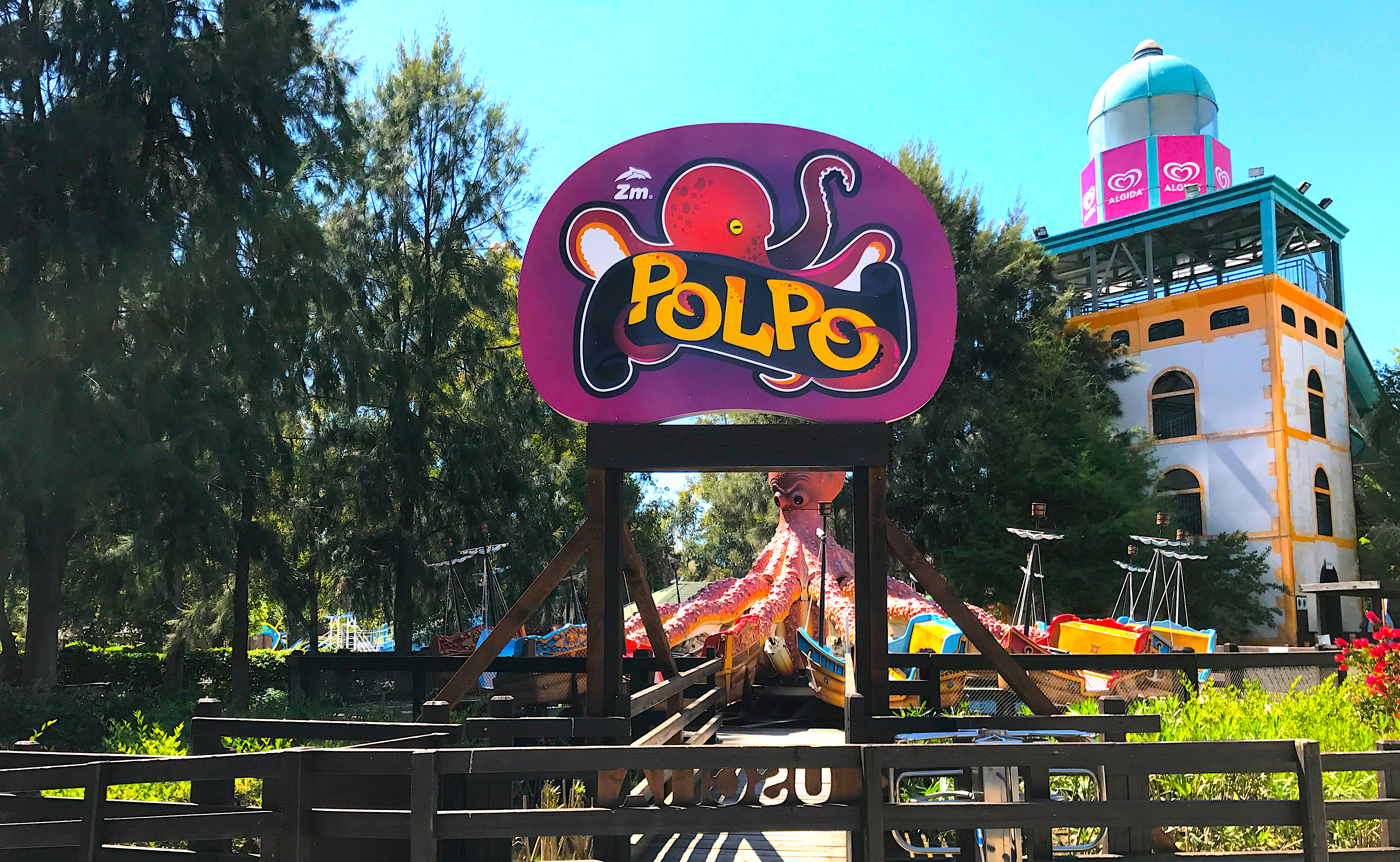
Octopus

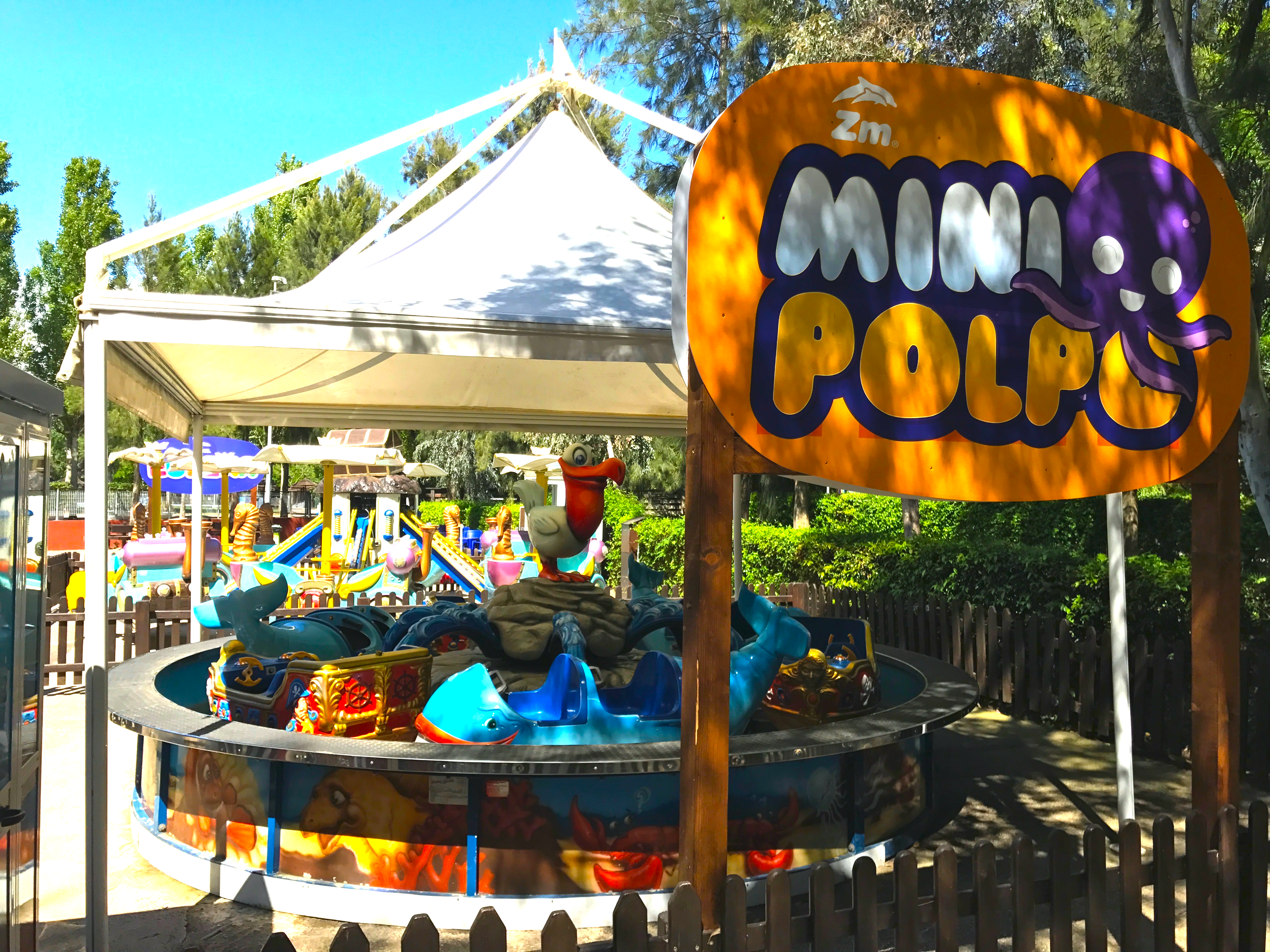
Mini octopus

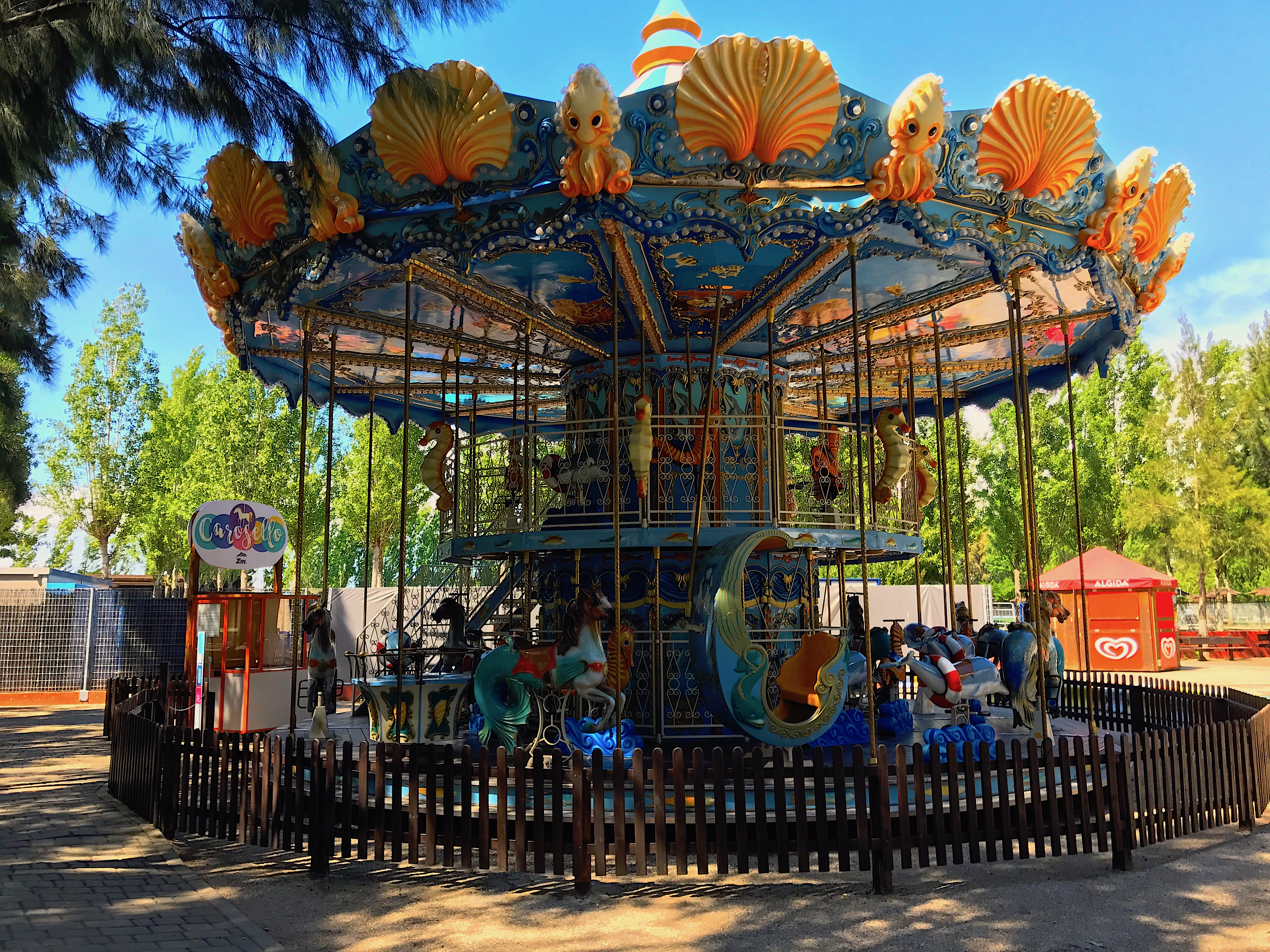
Carousel

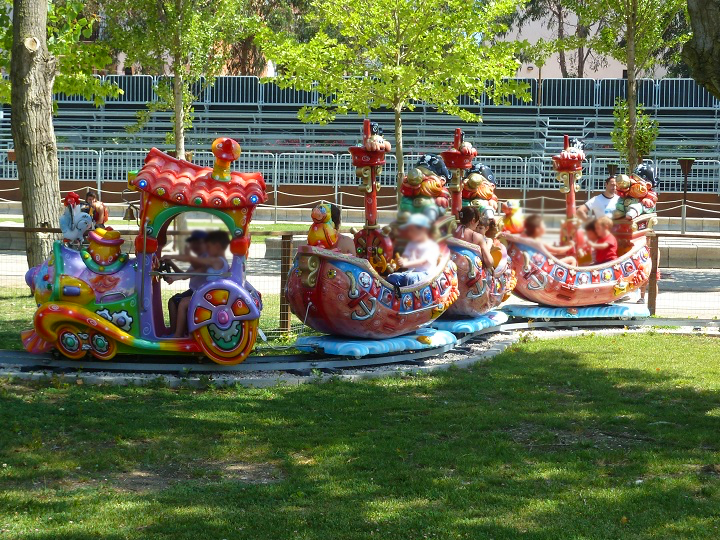
Trenino fattoria

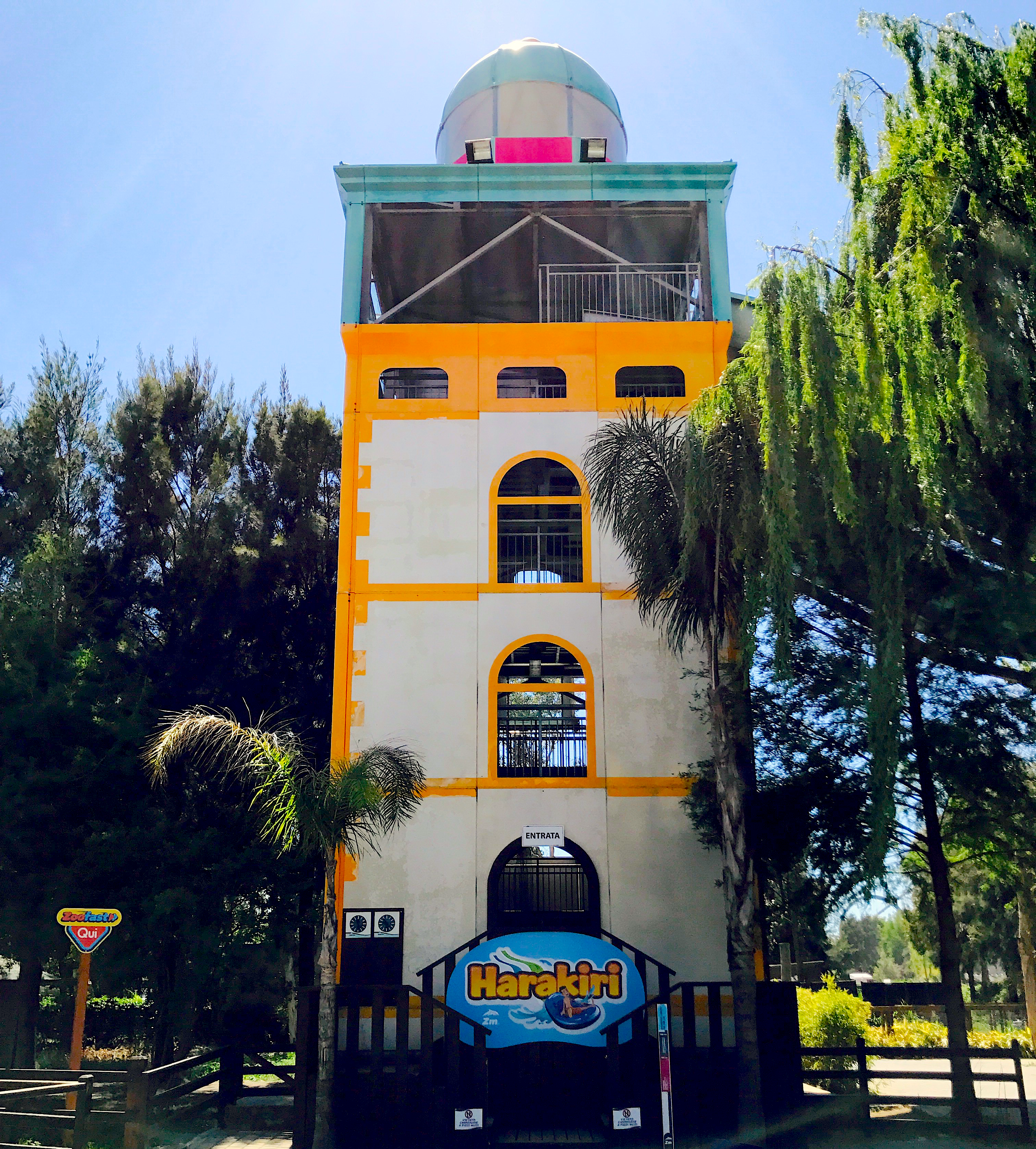
Harakiri

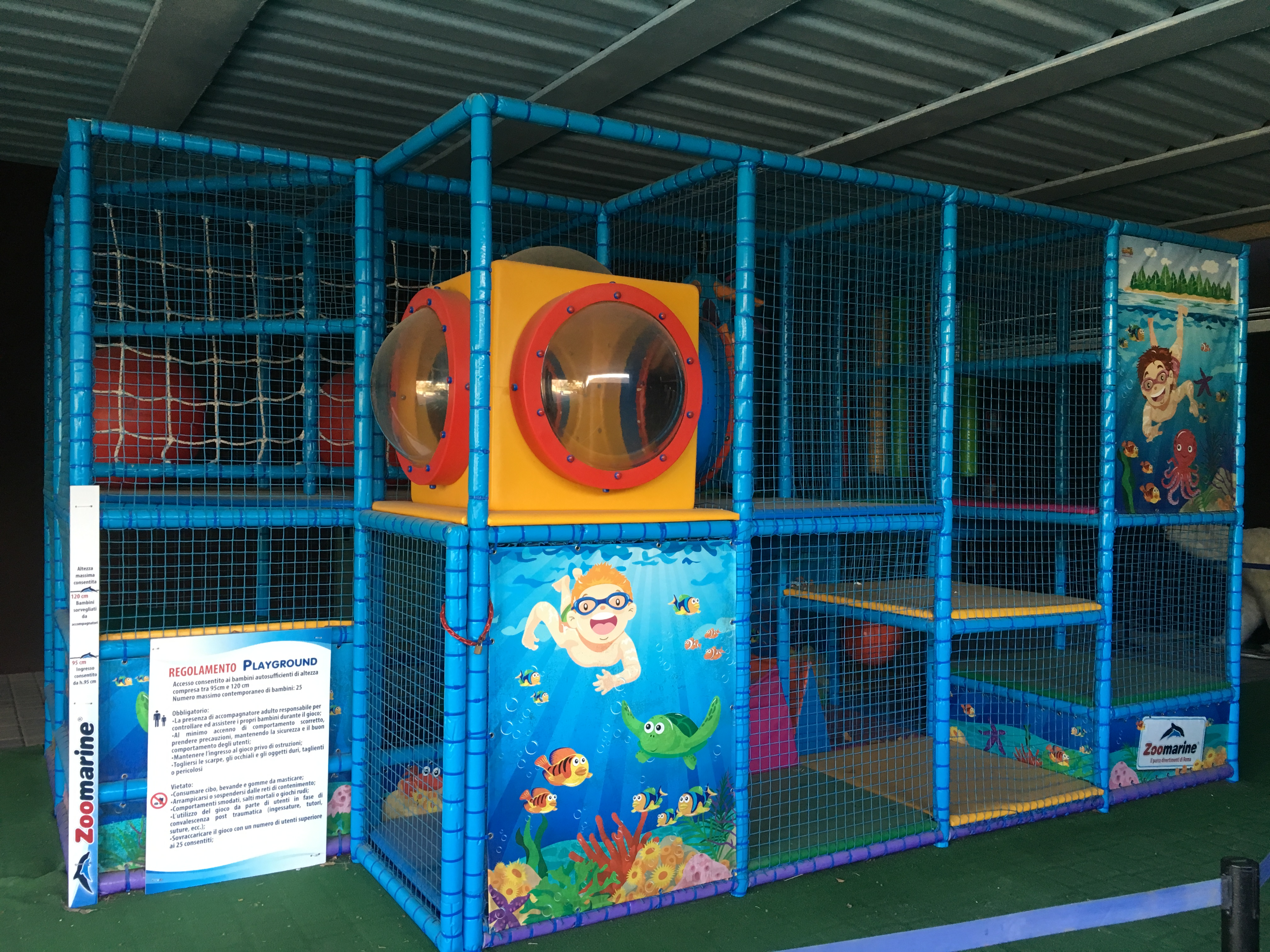
Playground Cinema 4D

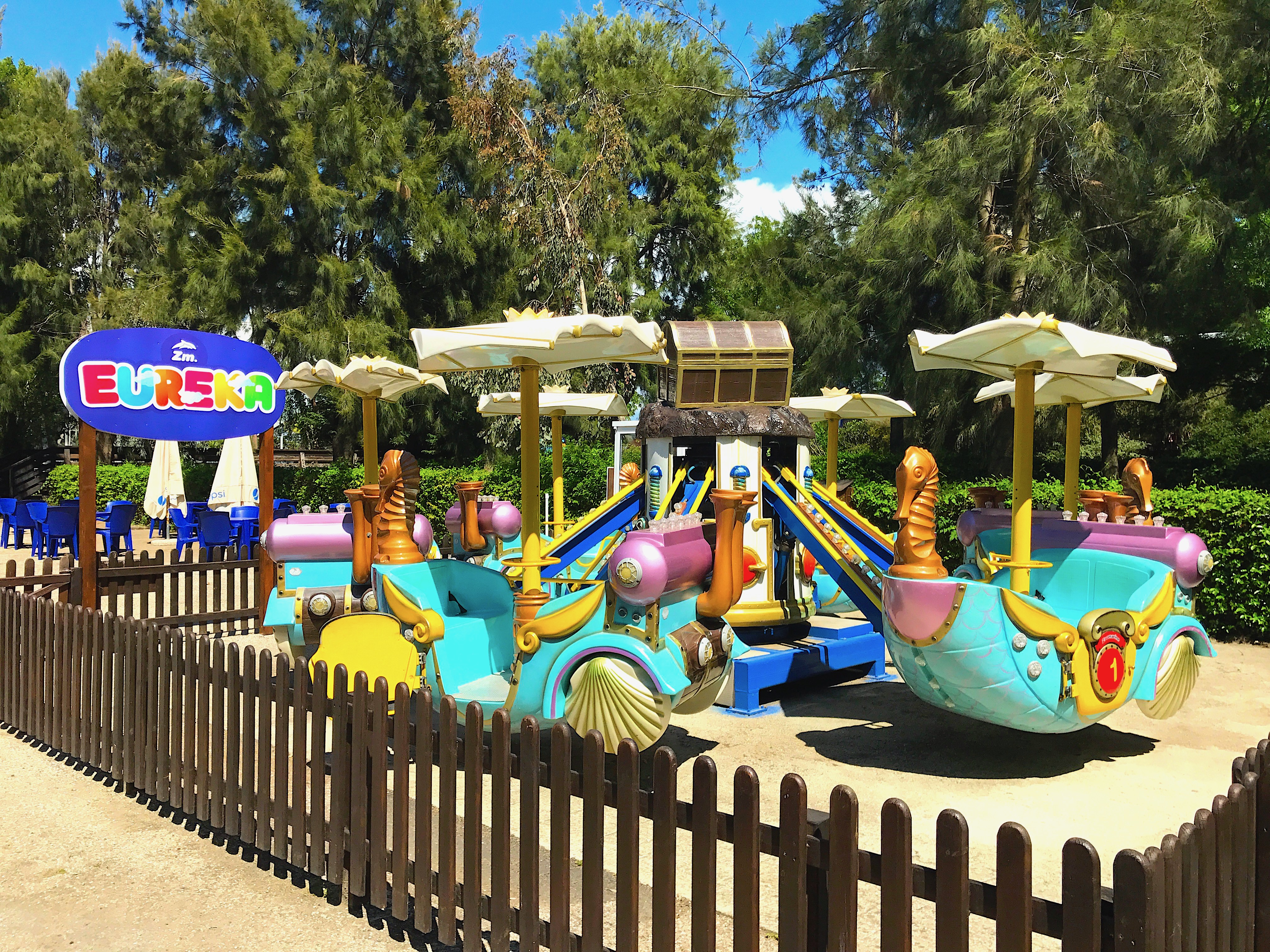
Eureka
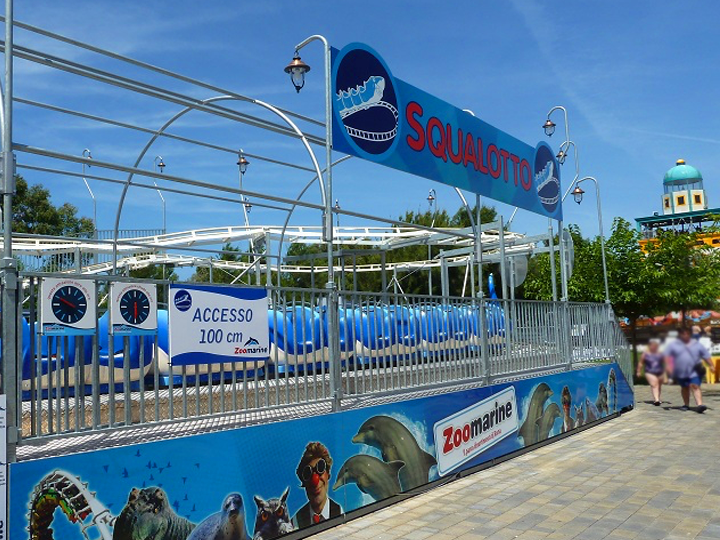
Squalotto

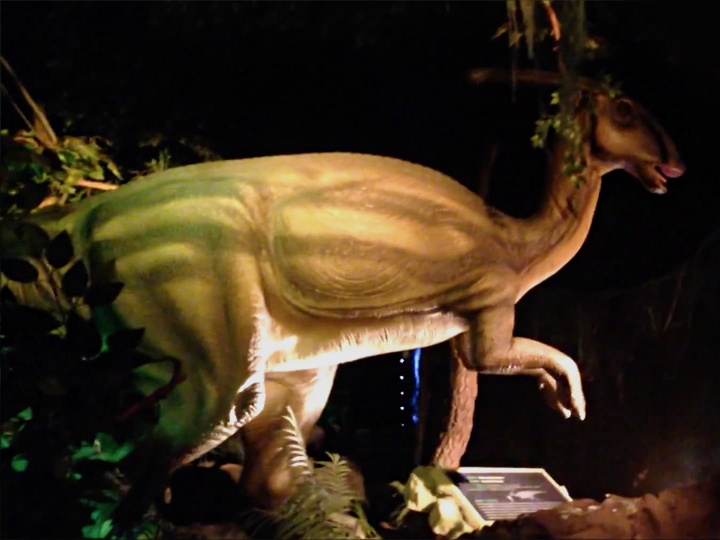
Era dei dinosauri

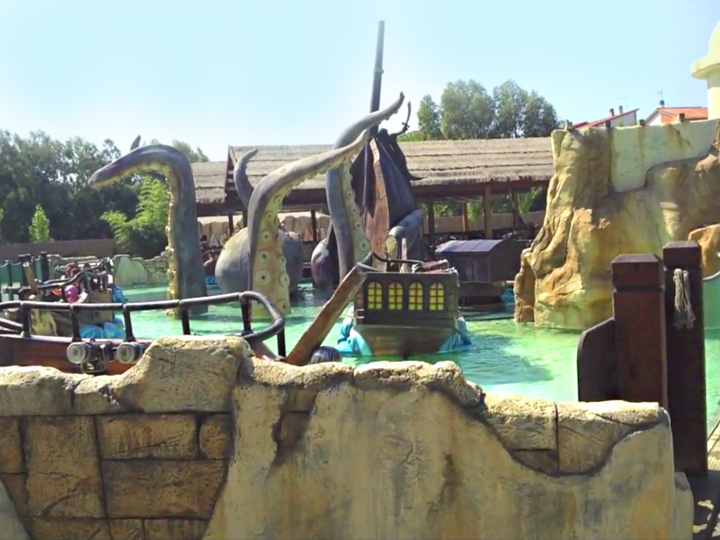
Laguna dei pirati

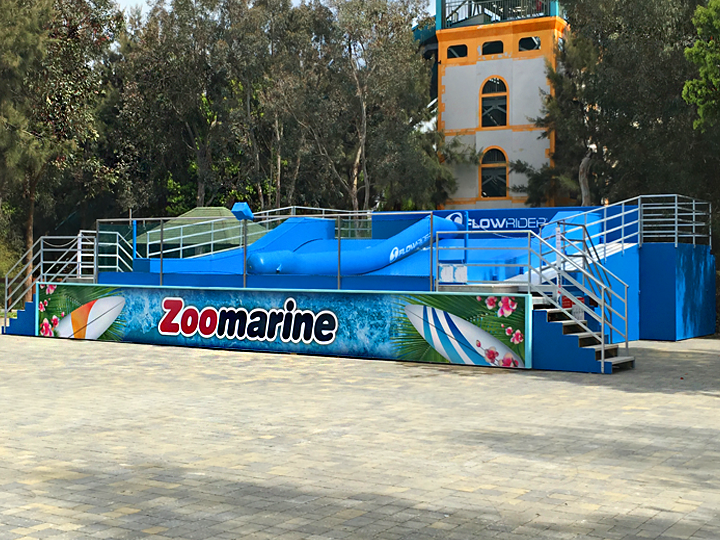
Flow Rider

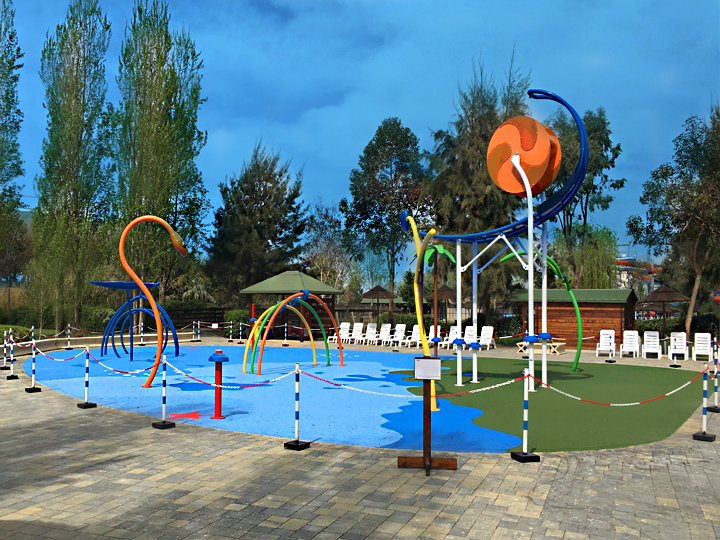
Hawaii

=== Attractions removed ===
The following attractions have been dismantled or decommissioned to make way for new attractions (in brackets the period in which they were in operation):

- Playground (2006-2016)
- Drop Zone (2009-2013), free fall tower
- Playground Amazonia (2016-2017), playground

==== Gallery Removed Attractions ====
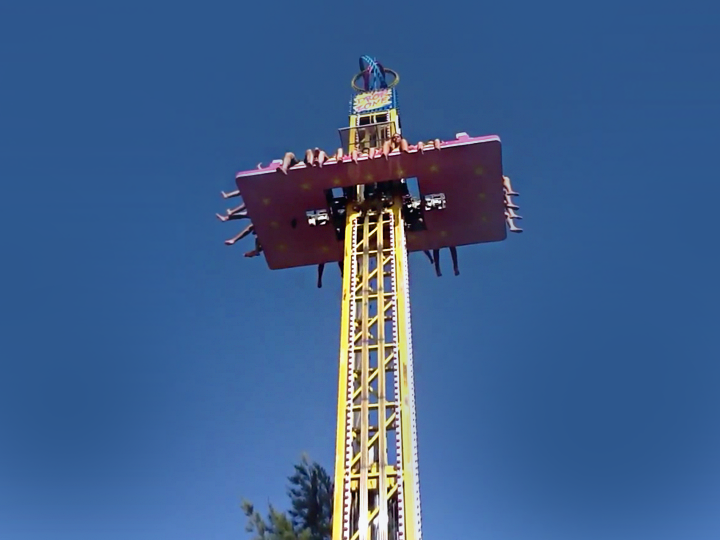
Drop Zone

== History ==
Born with the concept of a marine leisure park, the marine zoo has also become an amusement park and a water park. Zoomarine takes up the concept of the parks of the American group SeaWorld, just like the Zoomarine Algarve previously opened in Portugal, already owned by Mundo Aquatico SA. It attaches particular importance to the protection of nature and to the messages to convey to the public. It has a veterinary clinic and rehabilitation center for stranded animals.

In addition to its 5000 car park, there is a free shuttle service from Rome. Five hundred meters separate the park from the Tyrrhenian Sea. The construction of the park required 2 million euros which come from private resources with the support of large national banks.

In 2011, the park announced that its attendance had tripled in less than three years. It has grown from 220,000 visitors to more than 700,000 visitors per year, becoming the third Italian amusement park, an increase of 320%. Operating revenue increased from 5 to 20 million euros. That same year, director Stephen Cigarini was named director at Magicland (amusement park in Valmontone). Latella Aurelio resumes his post.

The company that owned Zoomarine Roma for a long time, Mundo Aquático, SA, was founded by Argentinian Pedro Lavia. This company is behind many other projects including the Mediterraneo Marine Park (Malta) and the Zoomarine (Portugal).

In 2015, the park located in Rome-Italy, was bought by the Mexican company Dolphin Discovery.
