= Yvan Arpa =

Swiss watch designer

Y. Arpa is a Swiss watch designer. He started his career as a mathematics professor who, after participating in professional martial art combats in Thailand and crossing Papua New Guinea by foot, came back to his roots in Switzerland.

In 1997, he joined the Richemont Group for Baume & Mercier as the Managing Director for Switzerland and as Sales Director for Europe and Asia.

From 2006 to 2009 he was the CEO of Romain Jerome introducing watches with rusted steel from the Titanic or real Moon dust.

In 2009 Yvan Arpa created his own company called Luxury Artpieces for which he launched the brands below:

- Black Belt Watch is inspired by the seven virtues, the samurai code of conduct, associated with the Bushido warrior. The brand proposes also a watch only for people who defends a black belt in Martial Arts.
- ArtyA: The brand is characterized by the unconventional raw materials it uses as butterfly wings, real bullets, fossilized dinosaur droppings, real spiders, boxes struck by lightning, tobacco leaves etc.

From 2010 to 2011, he acted as COO of Jacob&Co.

Yvan Arpa personalized a motorbike, which took more than 1'000 hours to sculpt and customize, with heavy artillery incrusted at the back, in the shape of a XXL shaped bullet belt.

In 2016, Yvan Arpa designed the smartwatch Gear S3 for Samsung.
