= Torvaianica =

Coordinates: 41°37′14″N 12°27′46″E

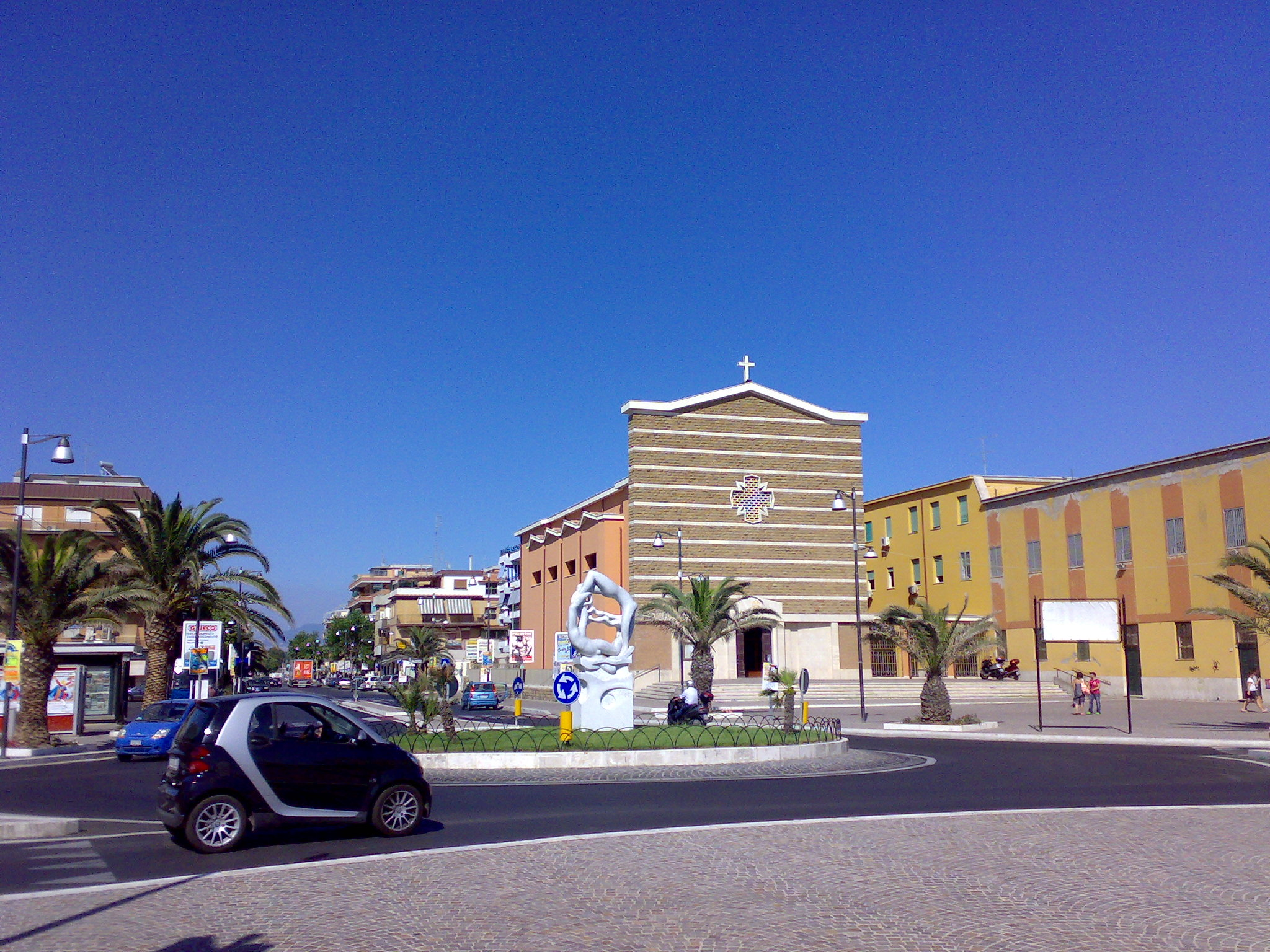
A square in Torvaianica.

Torvaianica or Torvajanica is a frazione of the comune of Pomezia, in the Metropolitan City of Rome, central Italy. Counting some 12,700 inhabitants, it extends for some eight kilometres (5.0 miles) on central Lazio's littoral.

== Overview ==
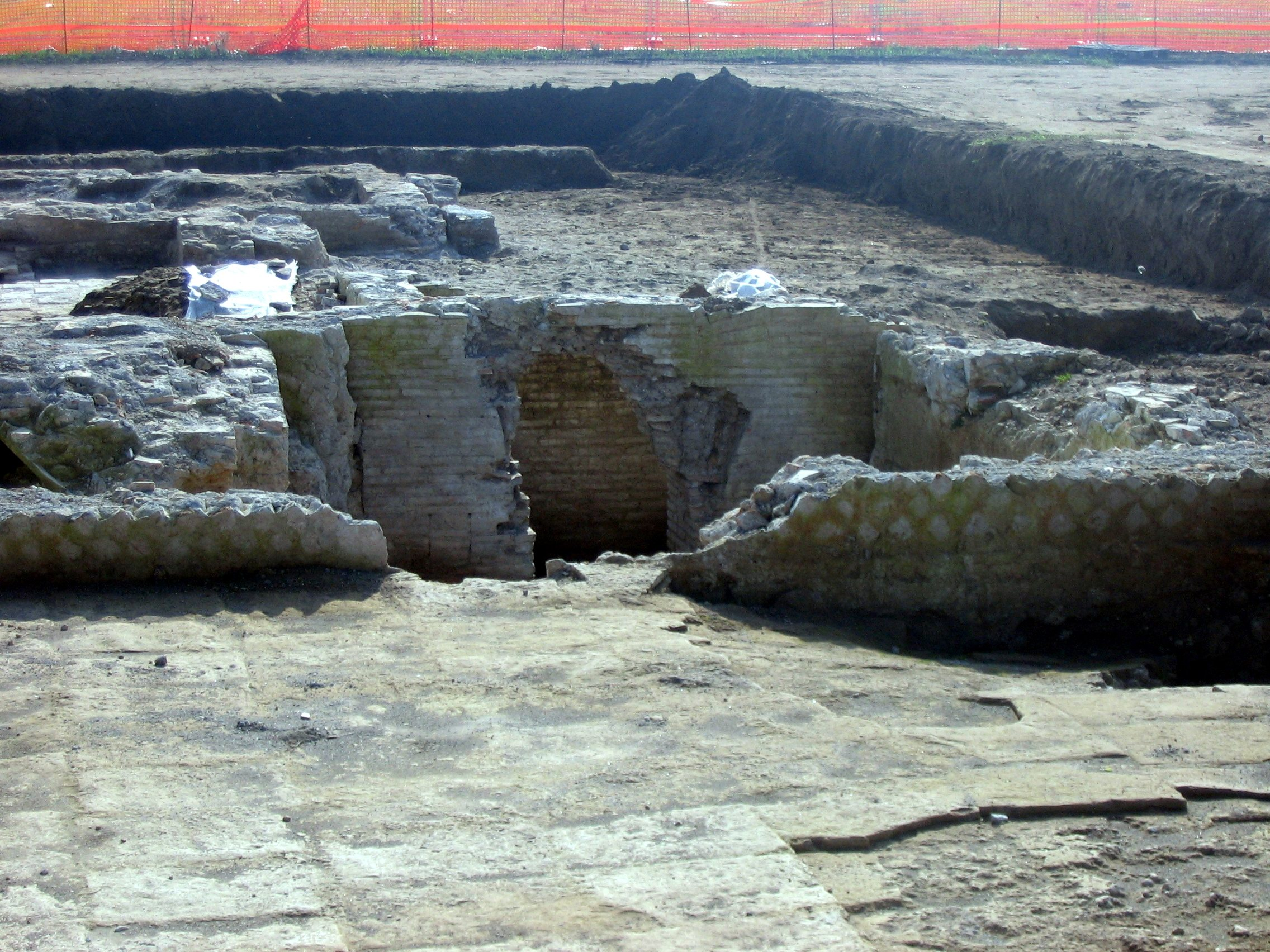
Roman villa of Torvaianica

According to Vergil's Aeneid, the Trojan hero Aeneas landed here: this event is confirmed by the excavation of the ancient Roman town of Lavinium in the neighbourhood of Torvaianica.

The name derives from a coastal watch tower, Torre del Vajanico, built in 1580 to defend against Barbary pirates attacks. The tower was damaged during World War II and demolished during the 1960s building speculations. The town was founded in the 1940s, after the reclamation of the Pontine Marshes; population at the time was mostly composed of fishermen.

The economy is mostly based on tourism. Torvaianica is home to the Zoomarine amusement park.

A Roman villa has been excavated nearby.

== See also ==
- Wilma Montesi
