= Francesco Foggia =

Italian composer

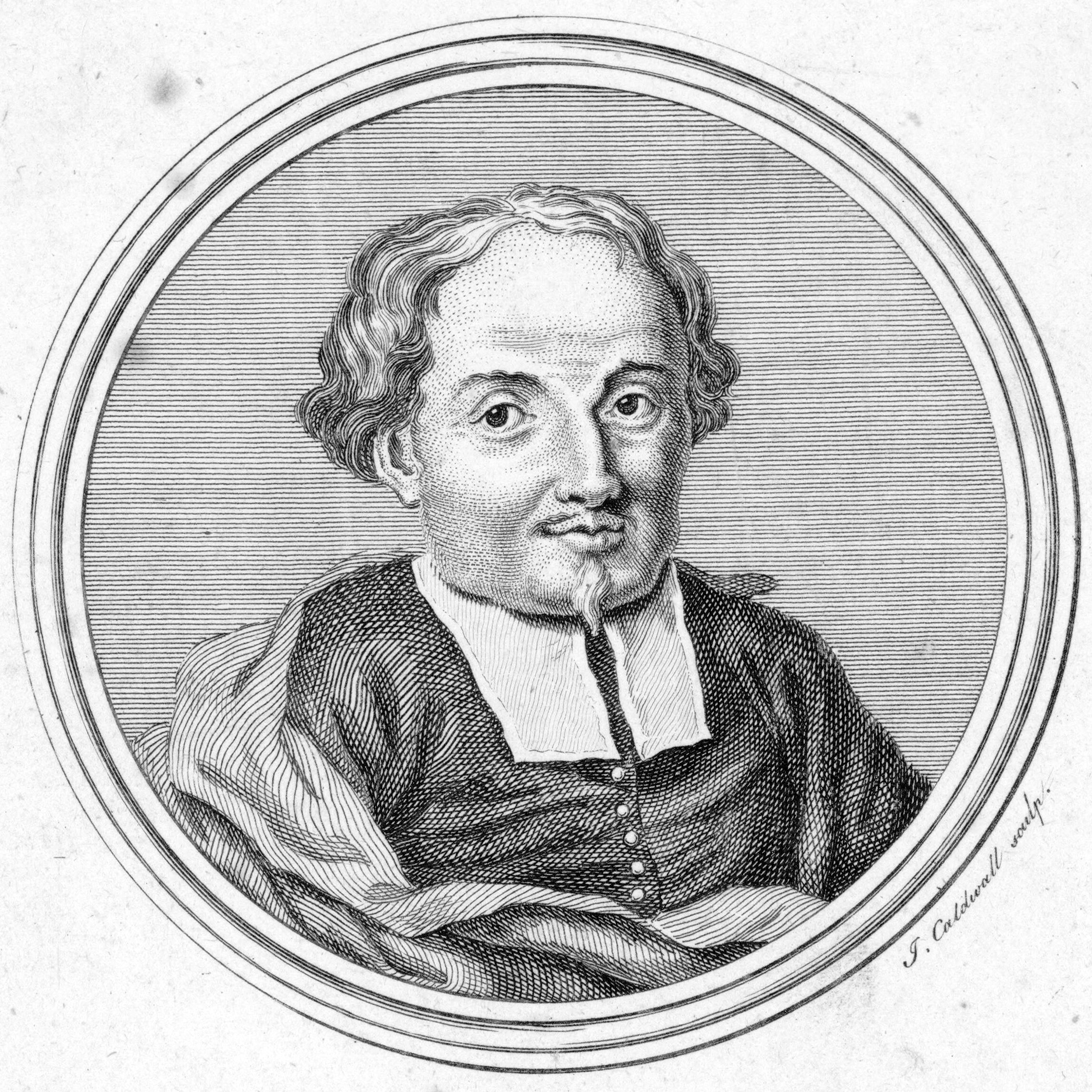
Francesco Foggia, portrait by James Caldwall.

Francesco Foggia (baptized 17 November 1603 – 8 January 1688) was an Italian Baroque composer.

== Biography ==
Foggia was a boy soprano at the Collegium Germanicum of the Jesuits in Rome, and was a student of Antonio Cifra, and Paolo Agostini. His family may have been in contact with Giovanni Bernardino Nanino, maestro di capella at San Luigi dei Francesi. Later, he was probably employed at the court of the Bavarian Elector Maximilian I in Munich and then again in Vienna.

He served in various churches in Rome as maestro di capella and infrequently as an organist. From October 1634 he served for two years at the chapel of St. Mary in Trastevere; from December 1646 to 1661 he was Kapellmeister of the Patriarchal Basilica of St. John Lateran. In 1667, while music director of the Basilica of San Lorenzo in Damaso, he published a collection, Psalmodia Vespertina, containing psalms, Magnificats, and Marian antiphons. From 1677 until his death, he was chapel master at the papal basilica of Santa Maria Maggiore in Rome, and while there published his valedictory Offertoria (1681). That publication has been linked to Palestrina's of about a century before. His son Antonio succeeded him in the same position at Santa Maria Maggiore. His wife Eugenia died on 12 March 1683; Foggia died on 8 January 1688 and was buried in the church of Santa Prassede in Rome.

== Works (selection) ==
Foggia's works were known outside the areas he worked - Italy, Munich and Vienna. For example, while he never worked in France, 7 of Foggia's motets survive in a collection by Danican Philidor, along with motets by Carissimi, Daniel Danielis, Pierre Robert and Lully.

- Beatus ille servus, 4-part motet for men's chorus and basso continuo, Braun-Peretti Bonn 1984
- Beatus vir qui timet dominum, Manuscript in the papers of Gustav Düben, edited by C. Hofius Ammerbuch, 2007
- Celebrate o fideles (1646), Manuscript in the papers of Gustav Düben
- Cessate, deh, Cessate for soprano and basso continuo, Cantio Sacra, vol. 38, ed. Rudolf Ewerhart, Verlag Edmund Bieler Köln 1976
- Confitebor tibi domine, Manuscript in the papers of Gustav Düben, edited by C. Hofius Ammerbuch, 2007
- David fugiens a facie Saul, oratorio
- De valle lacrimarum for soloists and basso continuo, Cantio Sacra, vol. 28, ed. Rudolf Ewerhart, Verlag Edmund Bieler Köln
- Dixit Dominus Domino meo, C. Hofius Ammerbuch, 2007
- Domine quinque talenta, Manuscript in the papers of Gustav Düben
- Egredimini addicte Christi nomini, Manuscript in the papers of Gustav Düben
- Eccelsi lumini cultures, Manuscript in the papers of Gustav Düben
- Exultantes et laetantes, Manuscript in the papers of Gustav Düben
- Gaudete jubilate o gentes, C. Hofius Ammerbuch, 2007
- Hodie apparuerunt voluptates, Manuscript in the papers of Gustav Düben
- Laetamini cum Jerusalem, Manuscript in the papers of Gustav Düben
- Laeta nobis refulget dies, Manuscript in the papers of Gustav Düben
- Laetantes canite diem laetitia, Manuscript in the papers of Gustav Düben, edited by C. Hofius Ammerbuch, 2008
- Laetatus sum in his, Manuscript in the papers of Gustav Düben
- Laudate Dominum omnes gentes, Manuscript in the papers of Gustav Düben, edited by C. Hofius Ammerbuch, 2007
- Laudate Pueri Dominum, C. Hofius Ammerbuch, 2007
- Magnificat for 5 voices and basso continuo
- Magnificat concertata con instromenti di 6 tono for 9-voice choir and instruments, C. Hofius Ammerbuch, 2007
- Quare suspiras in dolore anima mea
- Serve bone et fidelis
- Tobiae oratorium, oratorio
- Victoria Passionis Christi, oratorio
