= Regional Environmental Protection Agency =

- Agenzia Regionale per la Protezione Ambientale; ARPA

Agency overview
- Formed: January 21, 1994; 32 years ago
- Parent agency: Istituto Superiore per la Protezione e la Ricerca Ambientale (ISPRA)

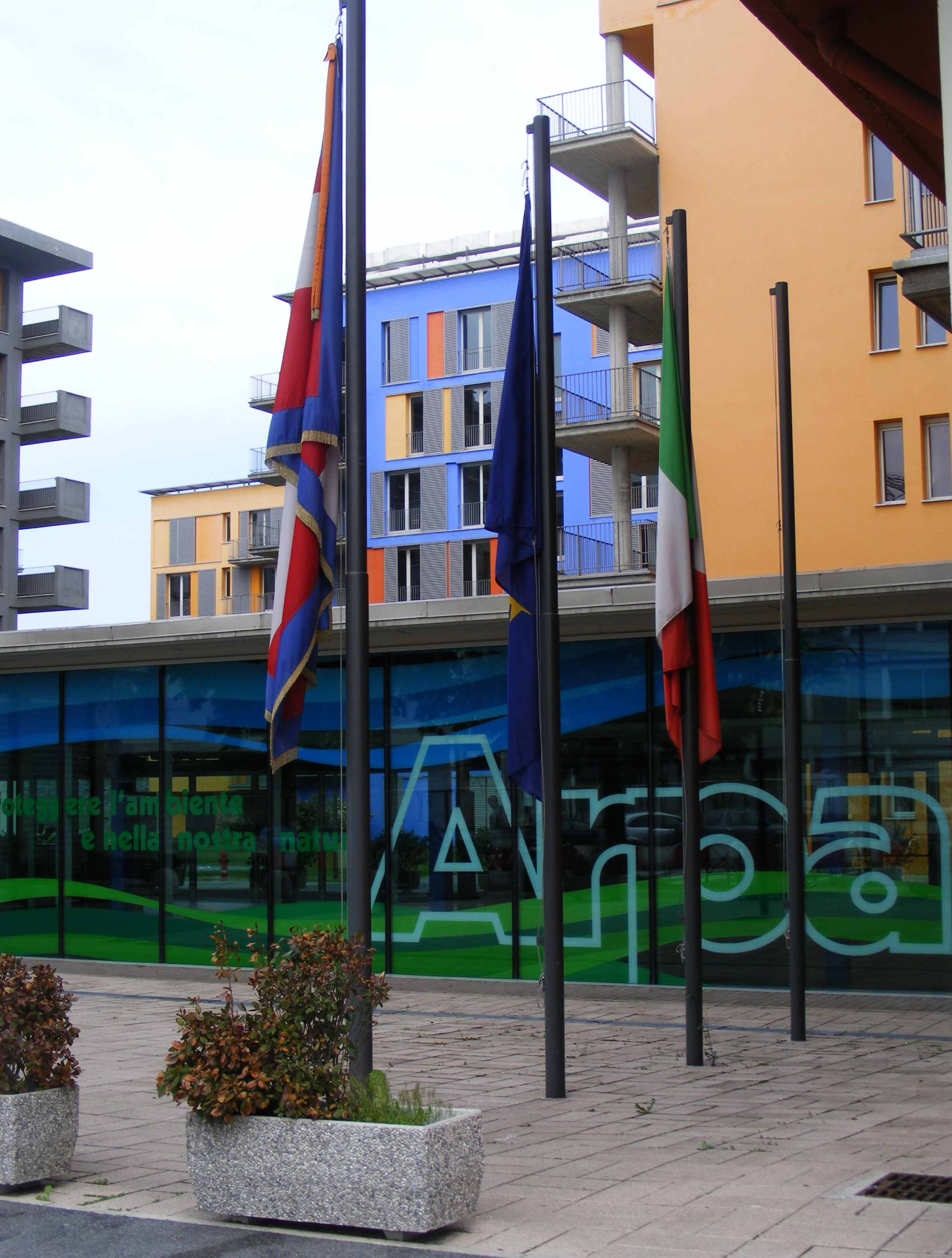
Headquarters of ARPA for Piedmont in Turin

The Regional Environmental Protection Agency (Italian: Agenzia regionale per la protezione ambientale), commonly shortened to ARPA, is the Italian environmental agency, one for each region of Italy (excluding Trentino-Alto Adige/Südtirol, which has been split for the two Autonomous Provinces of Trento and Bolzano).

== Purposes ==
The agencies are under regional or provincial administration and their main role is the natural environmental protection of Italy, with the task of keep under control the natural environment and verify environmental regulations.
