= Rinaldo dall'Arpa =

Italian composer, singer, and harpist

Rinaldo dall'Arpa (b. late 16th century – 12 July 1603) was an Italian composer, singer, and harpist. He was a valuable member of Carlo Gesualdo's retinue, and accompanied him to Ferrara on the occasion of Gesualdo's marriage in 1594. He may have remained in Ferrara as a member of the Este court until its dissolution in 1598. He wrote at least two keyboard pieces which survive.

== Notes ==
- Roland Jackson. "Rinaldo dall'Arpa", Grove Music Online, ed. L. Macy, grovemusic.com (subscription access).
