= Søren Kierkegaard bibliography =

List of works by Søren Kierkegaard

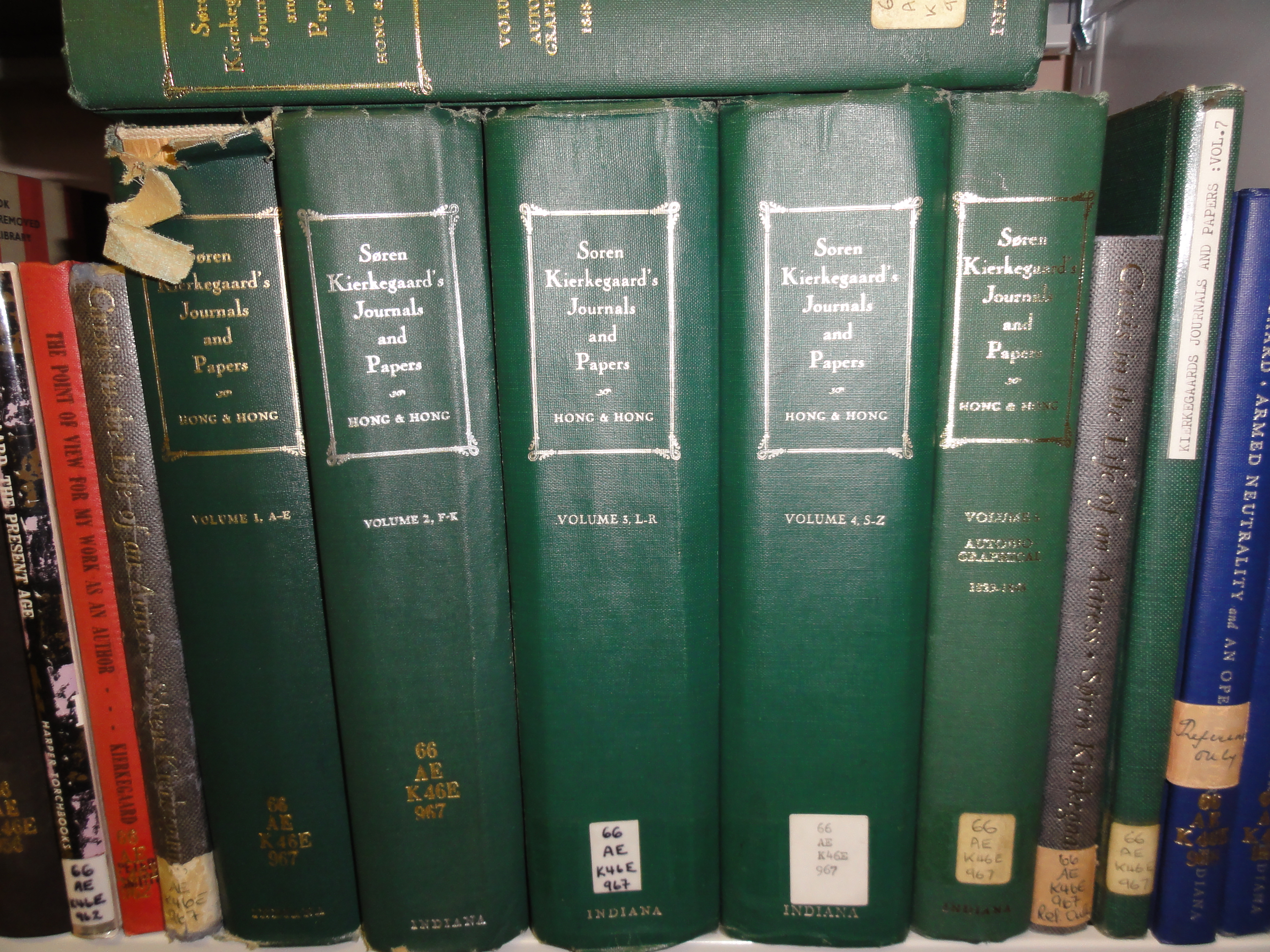
Kierkegaard's works were voluminous.

This article is a list of works by Søren Kierkegaard.

== A–D ==
- Armed Neutrality, and An Open Letter; with relevant selections from his journals and papers.

- trans. Howard V. Hong and Edna H. Hong with background essay and commentary by Gregor Malantschuk.
- Bloomington, Indiana University Press [1968]

- Attack upon Christendom

- trans. Walter Lowrie.
- Princeton, N.J., Princeton University Press [c1968]

- The Book on Adler

- eds. and trans. Howard V. Hong and Edna H. Hong.
- Princeton, N.J. : Princeton University Press, c1998.

- Christian Discourses and The Lilies of the Field and the Birds of the Air, and Three Discourses at the Communion on Fridays

- trans. by Walter Lowrie, D.D.
- Princeton, NJ : Princeton University Press, 1974.

- Christian Discourses; The Crisis and a Crisis in the Life of an Actress

- eds. and trans. Howard V. Hong and Edna H. Hong
- Princeton, N.J. : Princeton University Press, c1997.

- The Concept of Anxiety: a simple psychologically orienting deliberation on the dogmatic issue of hereditary sin

- eds. and trans. by Reidar Thomte with Albert B. Anderson
- Princeton, N.J. : Princeton University Press, c1980.

- The Concept of Irony, with continual reference to Socrates

- Together with notes of Schelling's Berlin lectures
- eds. and trans. by Howard V. Hong and Edna H. Hong
- Princeton, N.J. Oxford: Princeton University Press, c1989 (1992 [printing])

- Concluding Unscientific Postscript to Philosophical Fragments

- eds. and trans. by Howard V. Hong and Edna H. Hong
- Princeton, N.J. Princeton University Press, 1992.

- Concluding Unscientific Postscript to Philosophical Fragments

- Translated by David F. Swenson, completed after his death by Walter Lowrie
- Princeton, N.J. Princeton University Press, 1941

- The Corsair Affair and articles related to the writings

- eds. and trans. by Howard V. Hong and Edna H. Hong
- Princeton, N.J. Princeton University Press, c1981.

- Cumulative Index to Kierkegaard's Writings: the works of Søren Kierkegaard

- Cumulative index prepared by Nathaniel J. Hong, Kathryn Hong, Regine Prenzel-Guthrie
- Princeton, N.J. Princeton University Press, c2000.

- Diary of a Seducer

- trans. by Alastair Hannay
- London: Pushkin Press, 1999.

== E–J ==
- Either/Or (1843)
- Eighteen Edifying Discourses (1843-1844)
- Edifying Discourses in Diverse Spirits (1845)
- Fear and Trembling (1843)
- For Self-Examination: Recommended to the Present Age (1851)
- Four Upbuilding Discourses, 1843
- From the Papers of One Still Living (1838)
- The Highpriest - The Publican - The Woman, which was a Sinner
- Judge for Yourself! (1851, published posthumously 1876)

== K–Q ==
- Kierkegaard's Attack upon "Christendom" 1854-1855.

- Translated, with an introd., by Walter Lowrie.
- Princeton, N.J., Princeton University Press [1968]

- Kierkegaard's The Concept of Dread

- Translated with introduction and notes by Walter Lowrie.
- Princeton, Princeton University Press 1957.

- Kierkegaard's Concluding Unscientific Postscript

- Translated from the Danish by David F. Swenson, completed after his death and provided with introduction and notes by Walter Lowrie.
- Princeton, Princeton University Press, for American Scandinavian foundation, 1974, c1941.

- The Kierkegaard Reader

- edited by Jane Chamberlain and Jonathan R‚e.
- Malden, MA, Blackwell Publishers, 2001.

- Letters and Documents / Kierkegaard

- Translated by Henrik Rosenmeier, with introd. and notes.
- Princeton, N.J. : Princeton University Press, c1978.

- A Literary Review : Two ages, a novel by the author of A story of everyday life

- Translated with an introduction and notes by Alastair Hannay. London: Penguin, 2001, reviewed by S. Kierkegaard.
- Published by J.L. Heiberg, Copenhagen, Reitzel, 1845

- The Moment and late writings

- Edited and translated with introduction and notes by Howard V. Hong and Edna H. Hong. Princeton, N.J.
- Princeton University Press, c1998.

- On Authority and Revelation: The Book on Alder; or, A Cycle of Ethico-Religious Essays

- Translated with an introd. and notes by Walter Lowrie.
- New York, Harper & Row [c1966]

- Philosophical Fragments, Johannes Climacus

- Edited and translated with introduction and notes by Howard V. Hong and Edna H. Hong. Princeton, N.J.
- Princeton University Press, c1985.

- The Point of View for my Work as an Author; a report to history and related writings

- Translated with introd. and notes by Walter Lowrie. Newly edited with a pref. by Benjamin Nelson.
- New York, Harper [1962]

- The Point of View

- Edited and translated with introduction and notes by Howard V. Hong and Edna H. Hong.
- Princeton, N.J. Princeton University Press, c1998.

- Practice in Christianity

- Edited and translated with introduction and notes by Howard V. Hong and Edna H. Hong.
- Princeton, N.J. Princeton University Press, c1991.

- Prefaces; Writing sampler

- Edited and translated with introduction and notes by Todd W. Nichol.
- Princeton, N.J. Princeton University Press, c1997.

- The Present Age and Two Minor Ethico-Religious Treatises

- Translated by Alexander Dru and Walter Lowrie.
- London, New York [etc.] Oxford University Press, 1949.

- Purity of Heart is to Will One Thing; spiritual preparation for the office of confession

- Translated from the Danish with an introductory essay by Douglas V. Steere.
- New York Harper & Row [1956, c1948]

== R–Z ==
- Repetition: an essay in experimental psychology

- Translated with introduction and notes by Walter Lowrie.
- New York, Harper & Row [1964, c1941]

- The Sickness Unto Death: a Christian psychological exposition for upbuilding and awakening

- Edited and translated with introd. and notes by Howard V. Hong and Edna H. Hong.
- Princeton, N.J. : Princeton University Press, c1980.

- Stages on Life's Way

- Translated by Walter Lowrie. Introduction by Paul Sponheim.
- New York, Schocken Books [1967]

- Stages on Life's Way : studies by various persons

- Edited and translated with introduction and notes by Howard V. Hong and Edna H. Hong.
- Princeton, N.J. Princeton University Press, c1988.

- Thoughts on Crucial Situations in Human Life; three discourses on imagined occasions

- Translated from the Danish by David F. Swenson, edited by Lillian Marvin Swenson.
- Minneapolis, Minn., Augsburg publishing house [c1941]

- Three Discourses on Imagined Occasions

- Edited and translated with introduction and notes by Howard V. Hong and Edna H. Hong.
- Princeton, N.J. Princeton University Press, 1993.

- Three Upbuilding Discourses, 1843

- Edifying Discourses, by Søren Kierkegaard, Vol. I, Translated from the Danish by David F. Swenson and Lillian Marvin Swenson,
- Augsburg Publishing House, Minneapolis, Minnesota, 1943

- Eighteen Upbuilding Discourses, Søren Kierkegaard 1843-1844 Copyright 1990 by Howard V. Hong
- Princeton University Press

- Three Upbuilding Discourses, 1844

- Edifying Discourses, by Søren Kierkegaard, Vol. III, Translated from the Danish by David F. Swenson and Lillian Marvin Swenson,
- Augsburg Publishing House, Minneapolis, Minnesota, 1945

- Eighteen Upbuilding Discourses, Søren Kierkegaard 1843-1844 Copyright 1990 by Howard V. Hong
- Princeton University Press

- Training in Christianity and the Edifying Discourse which accompanied it

- Translated with an introduction and notes by Walter Lowrie.
- Princeton, N.J. Princeton University Press, 1967, 1972 printing.

- Two Ages : the age of revolution and the present age, a literary review, 1846

- Edited and translated with introd. and notes by Howard V. Hong, and Edna H. Hong.
- Princeton, N.J. Princeton University Press, [1978]

- Two Upbuilding Discourses, 1843

- Edifying Discourses, by Søren Kierkegaard, Vol. I, Translated from the Danish by David F. Swenson and Lillian Marvin Swenson,
- Augsburg Publishing House, Minneapolis, Minnesota, 1943

- Eighteen Upbuilding Discourses, Søren Kierkegaard 1843-1844 Copyright 1990 by Howard V. Hong
- Princeton University Press

- Two Upbuilding Discourses, 1844

- Edifying Discourses, by Søren Kierkegaard, Vol. III, Translated from the Danish by David F. Swenson and Lillian Marvin Swenson,
- Augsburg Publishing House, Minneapolis, Minnesota, 1945

- Eighteen Upbuilding Discourses, Søren Kierkegaard 1843-1844 Copyright 1990 by Howard V. Hong
- Princeton University Press

- Upbuilding Discourses in Various Spirits

- Edited and translated with introduction and notes by Howard V. Hong and Edna H. Hong.
- Princeton, N.J. Princeton University Press, 1993.

- Without Authority; The Lily in the Field and the Bird of the Air; Two Ethical-Religious Essays; Three Discourses at the Communion on Fridays; An Upbuilding Discourse : Two Discourses at the Communion on Fridays

- Edited and translated, with introduction and notes by Howard V. Hong and Edna H. Hong.
- Princeton, N.J. Princeton University Press, c1997.

- Works of Love

- Translated from the Danish by David F. Swenson and Lillian Marvin Swenson. With an introduction by Douglas V. Steere.
- Princeton, N.J., Princeton University Press, 1946.

- Works of Love

- Edited and translated with introduction and notes by Howard V. Hong and Edna H. Hong.
- Princeton, N.J. Princeton University Press, 1995.

== Original titles ==
Christian Discourses (Christelige Taler)
The Concept of Anxiety (Begrebet Angest)
The Concept of Irony (Om Begrebet Ironi)
Concluding Unscientific Postscript (Afsluttende uvidenskabelig Efterskrift)
The Crisis and A Crisis in the Life of an Actress (Krisen og en Krise i en Skuespillerindes Liv)
Edifying Discourses in Diverse Spirits (Opbyggelige Taler i forskjellig Aand)
Either/Or (Enten - Eller)
Fear and Trembling (Frygt og Bæven)
For Self-Examination: Recommended to the Present Age (Til Selvprøvelse. Samtiden anbefalet)
Four Upbuilding Discourses (1843) (Fire opbyggelige Taler)
Four Upbuilding Discourses (1844) (Fire opbyggelige Taler)
From the Papers of One Still Living (Af en endnu Levendes Papirer)
The Highpriest - The Publican - The Woman, which was a Sinner (Ypperstepræsten - Tolderen - Synderinden)
Judge for Yourself! (Dømmer selv!)
The Lilies of the Field and the Birds of the Air (Lilien paa Marken og Fuglen under Himlen)
A Literary Announcement (En literair Anmeldelse)
The Moment (Øieblikket)
On my Work as an Author (Om min Forfatter-Virksomhed)
Philosophical Fragments (Philosophiske Smuler)
The Point of View of My Work as an Author (Synspunktet for min Forfatter-Virksomhed)
Practice in Christianity (Indøvelse i Christendom)
Prefaces (Forord)
Repetition (Gjentagelsen)
The Sickness Unto Death (Sygdommen til Døden)
Stages On Life's Way (Stadier paa Livets Vei)
Three Discourses on Imagined Occasions (Tre Taler ved tænkte Leiligheder)
Three Upbuilding Discourses (1843) (Tre opbyggelige Taler)
Three Upbuilding Discourses (1844) (Tre opbyggelige Taler)
Two Minor Ethico-Religious Treatises (Tvende ethisk-religieuse Smaa-Afhandlinger)
Two Upbuilding Discourses (1843) (To opbyggelige Taler)
Two Upbuilding Discourses (1844) (To opbyggelige Taler)
Two Upbuilding Discourses at Friday Eucharist (To Taler ved Altergangen om Fredagen)
An Upbuilding Discourse (1850) (En opbyggelig Tale)
Works of Love (Kjerlighedens Gjerninger)
