= Bibliography of Søren Kierkegaard =

This is a bibliography of works by and about the 19th-century philosopher Søren Kierkegaard.

== Works by Søren Kierkegaard ==
Date	Title	Pseudonym (if applicable)
1834	"Another Defense of Woman's Great Abilities"	A
1836	"To Mr. Orla Lehmann"	
1836	"The Morning Observations in The Copenhagen Post No. 43"	B
1836	"On the Polemic of The Fatherland"	B
1838	From the Papers of One Still Living, Published Against His Will	
1838	The Battle between the Old and the New Soap-Cellars	
1841	On the Concept of Irony with Continual Reference to Socrates	
1842	"Public Confession"	
1843	"A Little Explanation"	
1843	Two Upbuilding Discourses, 1843: "The Expectancy of Faith", "Every Good and Perfect Gift is From Above" 1	
1843	Three Upbuilding Discourses, 1843: "Love Will Hide a Multitude of Sins" 1, "Love Will Hide a Multitude of Sins" 2, "Strengthening in the Inner Being"	
1843	Four Upbuilding Discourses, 1843: "The Lord Gave, and the Lord Took Away; Blessed Be the Name of the Lord", "Every Good and Perfect Gift is From Above" 2, "Every Good and Perfect Gift is From Above" 3, "To Gain One's Soul in Patience"	
1843	Either/Or	'A', an anonymous aesthete; 'B', Judge William; ed. by Victor Eremita
1843	"Who Is the Author of Either/Or?"	A. F.
1843	Fear and Trembling	Johannes de Silentio
1843	Repetition	Constantin Constantius
1843	De omnibus dubitandum est	Johannes Climacus; (unfinished and published posthumously, 1872)
1844	Two Upbuilding Discourses, 1844: "To Preserve One's Soul in Patience", "Patience in Expectation"	
1844	Three Upbuilding Discourses, 1844: "Think about Your Creator in the Days of Your Youth", "The Expectancy of an Eternal Salvation", "He Must Increase; I Must Decrease"	
1844	Four Upbuilding Discourses, 1844: "To Need God Is a Human Being's Highest Perfection", "The Thorn in the Flesh", "Against Cowardliness", "One Who Prays Aright Struggles in Prayer and Is Victorious—in That God Is Victorious"	
1844	Philosophical Fragments	Johannes Climacus, ed. by S. Kierkegaard
1844	The Concept of Anxiety	Vigilius Haufniensis
1844	Prefaces	Nicolaus Notabene
1845	Three Discourses on Imagined Occasions: "On the Occasion of a Confession", "On the Occasion of a Wedding", "At a Graveside"	
1845	"An Explanation and a Little More"	
1845	Stages on Life's Way	Frater Taciturnus et al.; "compiled, forwarded to the press, and published by" Hilarius Bookbinder
1845	"A Cursory Observation concerning a Detail in Don Giovanni"	A
1845	"The Activity of a Traveling Esthetician and How He Still Happened to Pay for the Dinner"	Frater Taciturnus
1846	Two Ages: A Literary Review	
1846	Concluding Unscientific Postscript to Philosophical Fragments	Johannes Climacus; ed. by S. Kierkegaard
1846	"The Dialectical Result of a Literary Police Action"	Frater Taciturnus
1847	Upbuilding Discourses in Various Spirits: "Purity of Heart Is To Will One Thing", "What We Learn from the Lilies in the Field and from the Birds of the Air", "The Gospel of Sufferings, Christian Discourses"	
1847	Works of Love	
1848	The Point of View for My Work as an Author	
1848	Three Notes Concerning My Work as an Author	
1848	Christian Discourses: 28 discourses in four parts	
1848	The Crisis and a Crisis in the Life of an Actress	Inter et Inter
1848	"Mr. Phister as Captain Scipio: A Recollection and for Recollection"	Procul
1849	Armed Neutrality: On My Position as a Christian in Christendom (published posthumously, 1880)	
1849	The Lily of the Field and the Bird of the Air	
1849	Three Discourses at the Communion on Fridays: "The High Priest", "The Publican", "The Woman Who Was a Sinner" 1	
1849	Two Minor Ethical-Religious Essays: "Has a Man the Right to Let Himself Be Put to Death for the Truth?", "The Difference Between a Genius and an Apostle"	H. H.
1849	The Sickness unto Death	Anti-Climacus; ed. by S. Kierkegaard
1850	An Upbuilding Discourse: "The Woman Who was a Sinner" 2	
1850	Practice in Christianity	Anti-Climacus; ed. by S. Kierkegaard
1851	"An Open Letter Prompted by a Reference to Me by Dr. Rudelbach"	
1851	Two Discourses at the Communion on Fridays: "To Whom Little is Forgiven, the Same Loveth Little", "Love Shall Hide the Multitude of Sins"	
1851	The Point of View of My Work as an Author	
1851	For Self-Examination	
1851	Judge for Yourselves!	
1851	The Dialectic of Ethical and Ethical-Religious Communication	
1855	This Must Be Said; So Let It Be Said	
1855	What Christ Judges of Official Christianity	
1855	The Changelessness of God	
1855	The Book on Adler: The Religious Confusion of the Present Age	Petrus Minor, ed. by S. Kierkegaard, published posthumously, 1872
1855	Articles in The Fatherland	
1855	The Moment	

== Works about Søren Kierkegaard ==
=== Literature ===
- Adorno, Theodor (1933). Kierkegaard – Konstruktion des Ästhetischen. Tübingen: Mohr Siebeck. ISBN 3-518-29302-8.
- Angier, Tom (2006). Either Kierkegaard/or Nietzsche: Moral Philosophy in a New Key. Farnham, Surrey: Ashgate Publishing. ISBN 0-7546-5474-5.
- Beck, M. (1928). Referat und Kritik von M.Heidegger: Sein und Zeit (in German). Indiana: Philosophische Hefte 1 7.
- Bergmann, Samuel Hugo (1991). Dialogical philosophy from Kierkegaard to Buber. New York: SUNY Press. ISBN 978-0-7914-0623-6.
- Bösl, Anton (1997). Unfreiheit und Selbstverfehlung. Søren Kierkegaards existenzdialektische Bestimmung von Schuld und Sühne (in German). Basel, Wien: Herder: Freiburg.
- Cappelorn, Niels J. (2003). Written Images. Princeton: Princeton University Press. ISBN 0-691-11555-9.
- Carlisle, Claire (2006). Kierkegaard: a guide for the perplexed. London: Continuum International Publishing Group. ISBN 978-0-8264-8611-0.
- Chaning-Pearce, Melville (1940). The Terrible Crystal: Studies in Kierkegaard and Modern Christianity. London: Kegan Paul, Trench & Trubner. World Cat
- Chaning-Pearce, Melville (1948). Soren Kierkegaard: A Study. London: James Clarke & Co. World Cat
- Conway, Daniel W.; Gover, K. E. (2002). Søren Kierkegaard: critical assessments of leading philosophers. London: Taylor & Francis. ISBN 978-0-415-23587-7.
- Dorrien, Gary (2012). Kantian Reason and Hegelian Spirit. The Idealistic Logic of Modern Theology (5th ed.). Hoboken, NJ: John Wiley & Sons. ISBN 978-0-470-67331-7.
- Dreyfus, Hubert (1998). Being-in-the-World: A Commentary on Heidegger's Being and Time, Division I. Cambridge, MA: MIT Press. ISBN 978-0-262-54056-8.
- Dru, Alexander (1938). The Journals of Søren Kierkegaard. Oxford: Oxford University Press.
- Duncan, Elmer (1976). Søren Kierkegaard: Maker of the Modern Theological Mind. Word Books. ISBN 0-87680-463-6.
- Kalkar (1847). "Denmark: Remarks on the State of the Danish National Church, by The Rev. Dr. Kalkar, Copenhagen". In Evangelical Alliance (ed.). Evangelical Christendom: Its State and Prospects. Vol. IX. London: Partridge and Co. pp. 269–274.
- Evans, C. Stephen (1996). "Introduction". Fear and Trembling by Søren Kierkegaard, translated by C. Stephen Evans and Sylvia Walsh. Cambridge: Cambridge University Press. ISBN 978-0-521-84810-7.
- Gardiner, Patrick (1969). Nineteenth Century Philosophy. New York: The Free Press. ISBN 978-0-02-911220-5.
- Gardiner, Patrick. (1988) Kierkegaard. Oxford University Press. ISBN 0-19-287642-2
- Garff, Joakim (2005). Søren Kierkegaard: A Biography, trans. by Bruce Kirmmse. Princeton: Princeton University Press. ISBN 978-0-691-09165-5.
- Hall, Sharon K (1983). Twentieth-Century Literary Criticism. Detroit: University of Michigan. ISBN 978-0-8103-0221-1.
- Hannay, Alastair (2003). Kierkegaard: A Biography (new ed.). Cambridge: Cambridge University Press. ISBN 0-521-53181-0.
- Hannay, Alastair; Marino, Gordon (1997). The Cambridge Companion to Kierkegaard. Cambridge: Cambridge University Press. ISBN 0-521-47719-0.
- Hegel, Georg Wilhelm Friedrich (1979). Phenomenology of Spirit. Oxford: Oxford University Press. ISBN 0-19-824597-1.
- Høffding, Harald (1896), Søren Kierkegard als Philosoph. Stuttgart: F. Frommann Verlag.
- Hong, Howard V; Hong, Edna (2000). The Essential Kierkegaard. Princeton: Princeton University Press. ISBN 0-691-03309-9.
- Howland, Jacob (2006). Kierkegaard and Socrates: A Study in Philosophy and Faith. Cambridge: Cambridge University Press. ISBN 0-521-86203-5.
- Houe, Poul; Marino, Gordon D. (2003). Søren Kierkegaard and the words. Essays on hermeneutics and communication. Copenhagen: C.A. Reitzel.
- Hubben, William (1962). Dostoevsky, Kierkegaard, Nietzsche, and Kafka: Four Prophets of Our Destiny. New York: Collier Books.
- Hutchens, Benjamin C (2004). Levinas: a guide for the perplexed?. London: Continuum International Publishing Group. ISBN 978-0-8264-7282-3.
- Jaspers, Karl (1935). Vernunft und Existenz. Fünf Vorlesungen (in German). Groningen.
- Jothen, Peder (2014). Kierkegaard, Aesthetics, and Selfhood: The Art of Subjectivity. Farnham, Surrey: Ashgate Publishing. ISBN 978-1-4094-7016-8.
- Kosch, Michelle (1996). Freedom and reason in Kant, Schelling, and Kierkegaard. Oxford: Oxford University Press. ISBN 978-0-19-928911-0.
- Lippitt, John (2003). Routledge Philosophy Guidebook to Kierkegaard and Fear and Trembling. London: Routledge. ISBN 978-0-415-18047-4.
- Lowrie, Walter (1942). A Short Life of Kierkegaard. Princeton: Princeton University Press.
- Lowrie, Walter (1968). Kierkegaard's Attack Upon Christendom. Princeton: Princeton University Press.
- MacIntyre, Alasdair (2001). "Once More on Kierkegaard". Kierkegaard after MacIntyre. Chicago: Open Court Publishing. ISBN 0-8126-9452-X.
- Mackey, Louis (1971). Kierkegaard: A Kind of Poet. Philadelphia: University of Pennsylvania Press. ISBN 0-8122-1042-5.
- Mackey, Louis (1986). Points of View: Readings of Kierkegaard. Tallahassee: Florida State University Press. ISBN 978-0-8130-0824-0.
- Malantschuk, Gregor; Hong, Howard; Hong, Edna (2003). Kierkegaard's concept of existence. Milwaukee: Marquette University Press. ISBN 978-0-87462-658-2.
- Matustik, Martin Joseph; Westphal, Merold, eds. (1995). Kierkegaard in Post/Modernity. Bloomington, Indiana: Indiana University Press. ISBN 0-253-20967-6.
- McGrath, Alister E (1993). The Blackwell Encyclopedia of Modern Christian Thought. Oxford: Blackwell Publishing. ISBN 0-631-19896-2.
- Mooney, Edward F. (2007). On Søren Kierkegaard: dialogue, polemics, lost intimacy, and time?. Farnham, Surrey: Ashgate Publishing. ISBN 978-0-7546-5822-1.
- Morgan, Marcia (September 2003). Adorno's Reception of Kierkegaard: 1929–1933 (PDF). University of Potsdam.
- Oden, Thomas C (2004). The Humor of Kierkegaard: An Anthology. Princeton: Princeton University Press. ISBN 0-691-02085-X.
- Muggeridge, Malcolm (1983). A Third Testament. Little Brown and Company. ISBN 0-345-30516-7. (Examines the lives of St. Augustine, Blaise Pascal, William Blake, Søren Kierkegaard, Fyodor Dostoevsky, Leo Tolstoy, and Dietrich Bonhoeffer)
- Ostenfeld, Ib; McKinnon, Alastair (1972). Søren Kierkegaard's Psychology. Waterloo: Wilfrid Laurer University Press. ISBN 0-88920-068-8.
- Pattison, George (2002). Kierkegaard's Upbuilding Discourses: Philosophy, theology, literature. London: Routledge. ISBN 0-415-28370-1.
- Pattison, George (2005). The Philosophy of Kierkegaard. Montreal: McGill-Queen's Press. ISBN 978-0-7735-2987-8.
- Popper, Sir Karl R (2002). The Open Society and Its Enemies Vol 2: Hegel and Marx. London: Routledge. ISBN 0-415-29063-5.
- Pyle, Andrew (1999). Key philosophers in conversation: the Cogito interviews. London: Routledge. ISBN 978-0-415-18036-8.
- Rorty, Richard (1989). Contingency, Irony, and Solidarity. Cambridge: Cambridge University Press. ISBN 0-521-36781-6.
- Sartre, Jean-Paul (1969). Being and nothingness: an essay on phenomenological ontology?. London: Routledge. ISBN 978-0-415-04029-7.
- Skopetea, Sophia (1995). Kierkegaard og graeciteten, En Kamp med ironi. Copenhagen: C. A. Reitzel. ISBN 87-7421-963-4.
- Staubrand, Jens (2009). Jens Staubrand: Søren Kierkegaard's Illness and Death (in English and Danish). Copenhagen: Søren Kierkegaard Kulturproduktion. ISBN 978-87-92259-92-9.
- Staubrand, Jens (2009). Søren Kierkegaard: International Bibliography Music works & Plays, New edition (in English and Danish). Copenhagen: Søren Kierkegaard Kulturproduktion. ISBN 978-87-92259-91-2.
- Stern, Kenneth (1990). "Kierkegaard on Theistic Proof". Religious studies. 26 (2). Cambridge: 219–226. doi:10.1017/S0034412500020370. S2CID 170283075.
- Updike, John (1997). "Foreword". The Seducer's Diary by Søren Kierkegaard. Princeton: Princeton University Press. ISBN 0-691-01737-9.
- Walsh, Sylvia (2009). Kierkegaard: Thinking Christianly in an Existential Mode?. Oxford: Oxford University Press. ISBN 978-0-19-920836-4.
- Watkin, Julia (2000). Kierkegaard. Londong: Continuum International Publishing Group. ISBN 978-0-8264-5086-9.
- Westfall, Joseph (2007). The Kierkegaardian Author: Authorship and Performance in Kierkegaard's Literary and Dramatic Criticism. Berlin: Walter de Gruyter. ISBN 978-3-11-019302-2.
- Weston, Michael (1994). Kierkegaard and Modern Continental Philosophy. London: Routledge. ISBN 0-415-10120-4.
- Westphal, Merold (1996). Becoming a self: a reading of Kierkegaard's concluding unscientific postscript. West Lafayette, Indiana: Purdue Press. ISBN 978-1-55753-089-9.
- Westphal, Merold (1997). "Kierkegaard and Hegel". The Cambridge Companion to Kierkegaard. Cambridge: Cambridge University Press. ISBN 0-521-47719-0.
- Wyschogrod, Michael (1954). Kierkegaard and Heidegger. The Ontology of Existence. London: Routledge.

=== Collections ===
==== Kierkegaard research by Ashgate Publishing ====
Directed by Jon Stewart, the Søren Kierkegaard Research Center Foundation, and the University of Copenhagen:

===== Sources =====
- Volume 1: Kierkegaard and the Bible, edited by Lee C. Barrett and John Stewart
  - Tome I: The Old Testament (June 2010)
  - Tome II: The New Testament (July 2010)
- Volume 2: Kierkegaard and the Greek World, edited by John Stewart and Katalin Nun
  - Tome I: Socrates and Plato (January 2010)
  - Tome II: Aristotle and Other Greek Authors (January 2010)
- Volume 3: Kierkegaard and the Roman World, edited by John Stewart (May 2009)
- Volume 4: Kierkegaard and the Patristic and Medieval Traditions, edited by John Stewart (June 2008)
- Volume 5: Kierkegaard and the Renaissance and Modern Traditions, edited by John Stewart
  - Tome I: Philosophy (July 2009)
  - Tome II: Theology (July 2009)
  - Tome III: Literature, Drama and Aesthetics (August 2009)
- Volume 6: Kierkegaard and His German Contemporaries, edited by John Stewart
  - Tome I: Philosophy (August 2007)
  - Tome II: Theology (August 2007)
  - Tome III: Literature and Aesthetics (June 2008)
- Volume 7: Kierkegaard and His Danish Contemporaries, edited by John Stewart
  - Tome I: Philosophy, Politics and Social Theory (November 2009)
  - Tome II: Theology (December 2009)
  - Tome III: Literature, Drama and Aesthetics (December 2009)

===== Reception =====
- Volume 8: Kierkegaard's International Reception, edited by John Stewart
  - Tome I: Northern and Western Europe (April 2009)
  - Tome II: Southern, Central and Eastern Europe (March 2009)
  - Tome III: The Near East, Asia, Australia, and the Americas (January 2009)
- Volume 9: Kierkegaard's Influence on Existentialism (May 2011)
- Volume 10: Kierkegaard's Influence on Theology, edited by John Stewart
  - Tome I: German Protestant Theology (May 2012)
  - Tome II: Anglophone and Scandinavian Protestant Theology (April 2012)
  - Tome III: Catholic and Jewish Theology (June 2012)
- Volume 11: Kierkegaard's Influence on Philosophy, edited by John Stewart
  - Tome I: German and Scandinavian Philosophy (February 2012)
  - Tome II: Francophone Philosophy (July 2012)
  - Tome III: Anglophone Philosophy (April 2012)
- Volume 12: Kierkegaard's Influence on Literature, Criticism and Art, edited by John Stewart
  - Tome I: The Germanophone World (February 2013)
  - Tome II: Denmark (October 2013)
  - Tome III: Sweden and Norway (June 2013)
  - Tome IV: The Anglophone World (April 2013)
  - Tome V: The Romance Languages and Central and Eastern Europe (May 2013)
- Volume 13: Kierkegaard's Influence on the Social Sciences, edited by John Stewart (November 2011)
- Volume 14: Kierkegaard's Influence on Social-Political Thought, edited by John Stewart (December 2011)

===== Resources =====
- Volume 15: Kierkegaard's Concepts, edited by Steven M. Emmanuel, William McDonald and John Stewart
  - Tome I: Absolute to Church (November 2013)
  - Tome II: Classicism to Enthusiasm (March 2014)
  - Tome III: Envy to Incognito (June 2014)
  - Tome IV: Individual to Novel (November 2014)
  - Tome V: Objectivity to Sacrifice (February 2015)
  - Tome VI: Salvation to Writing (July 2015)
- Volume 16: Kierkegaard's Literary Figures and Motifs, edited by John Stewart and Katalin Nun
  - Tome I: Agamemnon to Guadalquivir (October 2014)
  - Tome II: Gulliver to Zerlina (January 2015)
- Volume 17: Kierkegaard's Pseudonyms, edited by John Stewart and Katalin Nun (May 2015)
- Volume 18: Kierkegaard Secondary Literature, edited by John Stewart
  - Tome I: Arabic, Bulgarian, Chinese, Czech, Danish, Dutch
  - Tome II: English and Finnish
  - Tome III: French and German
  - Tome IV: Greek, Hebrew, Hungarian, Italian, Japanese, Korean, Norwegian
  - Tome V: Polish, Portuguese, Romanian, Russian, Serbian, Slovak, Slovenian, Spanish, Swedish, Turkish
- Volume 19: Kierkegaard Bibliography, edited by Peter Šajda and John Stewart
  - Tome I: Northern and Western Europe
  - Tome II: Southern, Central and Eastern Europe
  - Tome III: The Near East and Asia
  - Tome IV: Figures
- Volume 20. The Auction Catalogue of Kierkegaard's Library, edited by Katalin Nun, Gerhard Schreiber and John Stewart (April 2015)
- Volume 21. Cumulative Index, edited by Katalin Nun
