= Eighteen Upbuilding Discourses =

Signed works of Kierkegaard, 1843, 1844

The Eighteen Upbuilding Discourses (Danish: Opbyggelige Taler), sometimes called the Eighteen Edifying Discourses, is a collection of discourses produced by Søren Kierkegaard in 1843 and 1844. Although he published some of his works using pseudonyms, these discourses were signed. His discourses stress love, joy, faith, gratitude, thanksgiving, peace, adversity, impartiality, and equality before God and recommend them to the single individual.

Kierkegaard was not a preacher or a teacher at the beginning of his discourses, but by the end he removed the word, teacher. Later in Practice in Christianity he stated the problem he had with the modern sermon. "The Christian sermon today has become mainly observations. 'To observe' can mean in one sense to come very close to something, namely, to what one wishes to observe; in another sense, it signifies keeping very distant, infinitely distant, that is, personally." Practice in Christianity.

== Purpose ==
These discourses or conversations are intended to be "upbuilding", building up another person or oneself. Kierkegaard said: "Although this little book (which is called 'discourses,' not sermons, because its author does not have authority to 'preach', "upbuilding discourses," not discourses for upbuilding because the speaker makes no claim to be a teacher) wishes to be only what it is, a superfluity, and desires only to remain in hiding".

He also wrote that he was without authority. He explained in his Journals:

The reason I have always spoken of myself as being without authority is that I have felt that there was too much of the poetic in me, furthermore that I feel aided by something higher, and also that I am put together backward, but then, too, because I perceive that the profound suffering of my life and also my guilt make me need an enormous measure of Christianity, while at the same time I am fearful of making it too heavy for someone who may not need so great a measure. Of course, neither the God-man nor an apostle can have such a concern that I am just a poor human being.

- Søren Kierkegaard, Journals and Papers VI 289 n. 6587 (1850)

== Martin Buber ==
Martin Buber discussed his idea of the Single One this way:

Kierkegaard’s “to become a Single One” is, as we have seen, not meant Socratically. The goal of this becoming is not the “right” life, but the entry into a relationship. “To become” means here to become for something, “for” in the strict sense, which simply transcends the circle of the person himself. It means to be ready for the one relation which can be entered into only by the Single One, the one; the relation for whose man exists. This relation is an exclusive one, the exclusive one, and this means, according to Kierkegaard, that it is the relations which in virtue of its unique essential life, expels all other relations into the realm of the unessential. “Everyone should be chary about having to do with ‘the others’, and should essentially speak only with God and with himself,” he says in the exposition of the category. Everyone, so it is to be understood because everyone can be the one. Martin Buber, Between Man And Man, translated by Ronald Gregor Smith, 1947 p. 50

== Titling and translation ==
David F. Swenson first translated the works in the 1940s and titled them the Edifying Discourses. In 1990, Howard V. and Edna H. Hong translated the works again, calling them the Upbuilding Discourses. The word "upbuilding" was more in line with Kierkegaard's thought after 1846, when he wrote Christian discourses about suffering and later Christian deliberations about works of love.

== Packaging ==
Kierkegaard published these discourses in groups between 1843 and 1844. Confusingly, the publications shared names, with dates appended. They were:

- Two Upbuilding Discourses, 1843
- Three Upbuilding Discourses, 1843
- Four Upbuilding Discourses, 1843
- Two Upbuilding Discourses, 1844
- Three Upbuilding Discourses, 1844
- Four Upbuilding Discourses, 1844
