= 1844 in philosophy =

1844 in philosophy

== Publications ==
- Max Stirner's The Ego and Its Own (predated 1845)
- Søren Kierkegaard's Philosophical Fragments, Prefaces, and The Concept of Anxiety

== Births ==
- April 27 - Alois Riehl (died 1924)
- October 15 - Friedrich Nietzsche (died 1900)

–
