= Two Minor Ethical-Religious Essays =

Book by Søren Kierkegaard

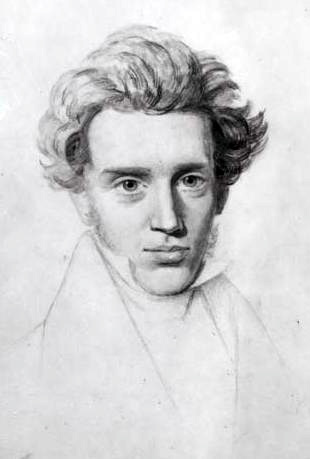
Unfinished sketch of Søren Kierkegaard by Niels Christian Kierkegaard, c. 1840

Two Minor Ethical-Religious Essays (original Danish title: Tvende ethisk-religieuse Smaa-Afhandlinger) is a work by the Danish philosopher Søren Kierkegaard, under the pseudonym H.H., written in 1847 and published on May 19, 1849. Kierkegaard wrote a book entitled A Cycle of Ethical-Religious Essays but chose to publish these two essays as a separate piece while leaving the rest unpublished. The unpublished work would eventually become The Book on Adler. The work is in dual authorship with his signed work Upbuilding Discourses in Various Spirits, also completed in 1847.

== Pseudonym ==
Kierkegaard, known for his frequent use of pseudonyms, would publish only overtly religious works under his own name, but published his philosophical works under pseudonyms. Each name cultivates a different personality reflective of the overarching meaning of the work. H.H. was the first of two religious pseudonyms, the second being Anti-Climacus, the author of The Sickness Unto Death and Practice in Christianity. While both are religious, H.H. is less intellectually and philosophically engaged than Anti-Climacus. H.H. is also not an idealized representation of Christianity despite writing authoritatively.

== First essay ==
The first essay is entitled Has a Man the Right to Let Himself Be Put to Death for the Truth? The essay outlines the idea and practice of martyrdom in Christianity and whether or not the martyr has the right to die for truth. The argument in the essay parallels both Kierkegaard's relationship to Regine Olsen and the Christian image of Jesus's crucifixion.

The essay's conclusion is that humans should not die for truth but instead be lovingly concerned for others. Kierkegaard would be later address this problem again in his essay Armed Neutrality, which is signed under his own name.

== Second essay ==
The second essay is entitled The Difference Between a Genius and an Apostle. The work focuses on the issue of those who are associated with the "Absolute" (i.e., God) and those who are naturally intelligent or gifted. Although both types of men are similar, the apostle speaks with authority, whereas the genius does not. Kierkegaard regarded it as thoughtless to call St. Paul a genius if he was divinely inspired, since he spoke with authority.

A genius and an apostle are qualitatively different. All thought breathes in immanence, whereas faith and the paradox are a qualitative sphere unto themselves. Genius is immediateness. Genius is born. An apostle is not born: an apostle is a man called and appointed by God, receiving a mission from him. Authority is the decisive quality.
