= Two Upbuilding Discourses (1843) =

1843 book by Søren Kierkegaard

- Author: Søren Kierkegaard
- Original title: To opbyggelige Taler
- Language: Danish
- Series: First authorship (Discourses)
- Genre: Christianity, philosophy
- Publisher: Bookdealer P. G. Philipsen
- Publication date: May 16, 1843
- Publication place: Denmark
- English publication date: 1943 – first translation
- Preceded by: Either/Or
- Followed by: Fear and Trembling Three Upbuilding Discourses Repetition

Two Upbuilding Discourses is a book by Søren Kierkegaard published in 1843.

== History ==
Kierkegaard published Two Upbuilding Discourses three months after Either/Or, which ended without a conclusion to the argument between A, the aesthete, and B, the ethicist, as to which is the best way to live one's life.

In 1832, Hegel argued against Christianity by saying that knowledge is not something hurtful to faith but helpful. He says philosophy (the love of knowledge) "has the same content as religion." This is due, in part, to the efforts of "Anselm and Abelard, who further developed the essential structure of faith" in the Middle Ages.

Upbuilding was translated as Edifying in 1946 when David F. Swenson first translated them. They became Upbuilding Discourses in Howard V. Hong's translation of 1990.

== Structure ==
The first two discourses are titled:

1. "The Expectancy of Faith"
2. "Every Good and Every Perfect Gift is From Above"

== Reception ==
Kierkegaard sold 200 copies of the Discourses and only one editor reviewed it. Either/Or was reviewed by both Meïr Aron Goldschmidt and Johan Ludvig Heiberg. The Two Discourses had to wait until 1927 to be noticed and was not translated into English until 1946, when David F. Swenson translated the eighteen discourses and published them in four volumes. Hong later translated and compiled them in 1990 into one volume.

== Criticism ==
Walter Lowrie said the Two Discourses were an "either/or" meant for Regine Olsen. His general approach to the discourses was how they related to the outer aspects of Kierkegaard's life; especially his relationship with Olsen. He also mentions that his Upbuilding Discourses were "tardily translated" by the Germans "for the sake of completing the edition". "Therefore, since these works were not available to students the pseudonyms works were not rightly understood."

== Sources ==
=== Primary sources ===
- Two Upbuilding Discourses, 1843 Swenson translation
- Eighteen Upbuilding Discourses, by Søren Kierkegaard, Princeton University Press. Hong, 1990
- Either/Or Part I, Edited by Victor Eremita, February 20, 1843, translated by David F. Swenson and Lillian Marvin Swenson Princeton University Press 1971
- Either/Or Part 2, Edited by Victor Eremita, February 20, 1843, Hong 1987
- Fear and Trembling; Copyright 1843 Søren Kierkegaard – Kierkegaard’s Writings; 6 – copyright 1983 – Howard V. Hong
- Concluding Unscientific Postscript to Philosophical Fragments Volume I, by Johannes Climacus, edited by Søren Kierkegaard, Copyright 1846 – Edited and Translated by Howard V. Hong and Edna H. Hong 1992 Princeton University Press
- The Point of View for My Work as An Author: A Report to History, edited by Benjamin Neilson, by Søren Kierkegaard 1848, Translated with Introductory Notes by Walter Lowrie, 1962, Harper and Row Publishers
- The Sickness Unto Death, by Anti-Climacus, Edited by Søren Kierkegaard, Copyright 1849 Translation with an Introduction and notes by Alastair Hannay 1989

=== Secondary sources ===
- Lectures on the philosophy of religion, together with a work on the proofs of the existence of God, Vol 1, Translated from the 2d German ed. by E.B. Speirs, and J. Burdon Sanderson: the translation edited by E.B. Speirs (1895) Hegel, Georg Wilhelm Friedrich, 1832
- Søren Kierkegaard, A Biography, by Johannes Hohlenberg, Translated by T.H. Croxall, Pantheon Books 1954
- Hunt, George Laird, "Ten makers of modern Protestant thought Schweitzer, Rauschenbusch, Temple, Kierkegaard, Barth, Brunner, Niebuhr, Tillich, Bultmann, Buber, 1958".
- A Short Life of Kierkegaard, by Walter Lowrie, Princeton University Press, 1942, 1970

=== Online sources ===
- A Selection from Two Upbuilding Discourses 1843 Free Audio
- Notre Dame Philosophical Reviews "Kierkegaard's Upbuilding Discourses, Philosophy, theology, literature, by Pattison, George, Routledge, 2002, 240pp". ISBN 0-415-28370-1
