= Prefaces =

1844 book by Søren Kierkegaard

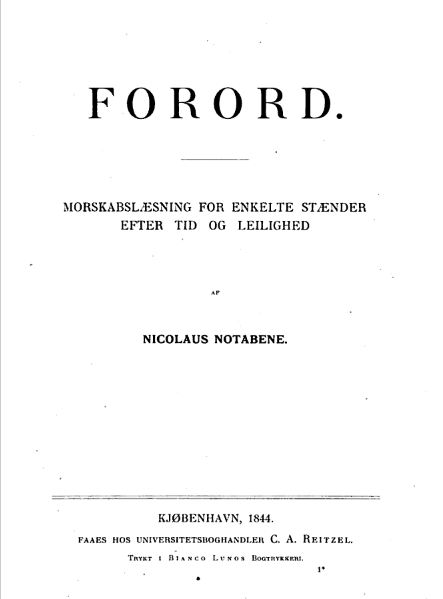
- Prefaces, Danish title page
- Author: Søren Kierkegaard
- Original title: Forord
- Translator: Todd W. Nichol
- Language: Danish
- Series: First authorship (Pseudonymous)
- Genre: Philosophy
- Publisher: Princeton University Press 1977
- Publication date: June 17, 1844
- Publication place: Denmark
- English publication date: 1997 – first translation
- Media type: Paperback
- Pages: ~68
- ISBN: 978-0-691-14073-5
- Preceded by: Philosophical Fragments
- Followed by: The Concept of Anxiety

Prefaces (Danish: Forord) is a book by Søren Kierkegaard published under the pseudonym Nicolaus Notabene. The meaning of the pseudonym used for Prefaces, Nicolaus Notabene, was best summed up in his work Writing Sampler, where Kierkegaard said twice for emphasis, “Please read the following preface, because it contains things of the utmost importance.” He was trying to tell his critics to read the preface to his books because they have the key to understanding them. Nota bene is Latin for "note well".

== Context ==
Prefaces was published June 17, 1844, the same date as The Concept of Anxiety (also by a pseudonym: Vigilius Haufniensis). This was the second time Kierkegaard published his works on the same date, (the first being Oct 16, 1843, with the publication of Repetition alongside Three Upbuilding Discourses, 1843 and Fear and Trembling). Kierkegaard published 14 separate works between the publication of Either/Or on February 20, 1843, and Four Upbuilding Discourses which he published on August 31, 1844.

Kierkegaard contrasted one fictional author with another frequently. This book and its companion piece, The Concept of Anxiety, contrasts Notabene, who is mediated by his wife as well as his reviewer, with Haufniensis, who is against his knowledge of sin being mediated by Adam.

If mediation were really all that it is made out to be, then there is probably only one power that knows how to use it with substance and emphasis; that is the power that governs all things. And there is only one language in which it belongs, the language that is used in that council of divinity to which philosophers send delegates no more than landholders do, and from which philosophers receive regular couriers no more than small landholders do. Prefaces p. 35

Nicolaus Notabene is a married man who wants to be a writer. His new wife becomes suspicious and forces him to vow to write only prefaces. It is a series of prefaces for unwritten books, books unwritten because the fictitious Notabene's wife has sworn to divorce him if he ever becomes a writer. But for Notabene writing a preface is just a prelude to an act, it's “like sharpening a scythe or like tuning a guitar”. He tried flattering his wife by telling her she is the “muse who inspires him,” but she says, “Either a properly married man or …” He “promises not to insist on being an author.” Since he wants to live in the “literary world” he makes sure he lives up to the “custom” of the “sacred vow”. (Note: Prefaces p. 12, 14 Just as Abraham promised to sacrifice Isaac and the Young Man promised to marry the girl. (See Fear and Trembling and Repetition) Kierkegaard wanted to live an ethical life but he also wanted to do what God wanted him to do. He wrote the following: “The ethical individual knows himself, but this knowing is not simply contemplation, for then the individual comes to be defined according to his necessity. It is a collecting of oneself; which itself is an action, and this is why I have aforethought used the expression “to choose oneself” instead of “to know oneself.” Either/Or Part II, Hong p. 258 Also Kierkegaard's Journals Gilleleie, August 1, 1835. Either/Or Vol II pp. 361–362)

“To be an author when one is a married man,” she says, “is downright unfaithfulness, directly contrary to what the pastor said, since the validity of marriage is in this, that a man is to hold fast to his wife and to no other.” Prefaces p. 10

He writes prefaces about “the reading public's” relationship to an author. The author has to “live in public view” once she publishes a book. Notabene then attacks reviewers of books in general, calling them “the highly trusted minions of the most esteemed public, its cupbearers and privy counselors" and the reviewers of his books, Either/Or and Repetition, Johan Ludvig Heiberg and Hans Lassen Martensen in particular. Kierkegaard was complaining because his books weren't being read, they were being mediated. He says, “a rumor carries away the reading public as the muse’s impulse the poet, since like always effects like.” And the rumor was that all theologians should be philosophers. Kierkegaard put it this way.

Philosophy makes every theologian into a philosopher and does it so that he can satisfy the demand of the times, which must then be philosophical, which in turn presupposes that the times, that is, the totality of individuals, are philosophical. What a lofty hope for every theological graduate! Prefaces p. 51

Notabene makes fun of Heiberg because Heiberg seems to want to explain everything, just like Hegel. Both want to be mediators of understanding. But Notabene says,

My frame, my health, my entire constitution do not lend themselves to mediation. It may well be that this is a flaw, but when I myself confess it, surely one might humor me. When the word “mediation” is merely mentioned everything becomes so magnificent and grandiose that I do not feel well but am oppressed and chafed. Have compassion on me in only this one respect; exempt me from mediation and, what is a necessary consequence, from becoming the innocent occasion that would cause one or another philosophical prattler to repeat, like a child at the chancel step, something I indeed know well enough: the history of modern philosophy’s beginning with Descartes, and the philosophical fairy tale about how being and nothing combine their deficiencies so that becoming emerges from it, along with whatever other amazing things happened later in the continuation of the tale, which is very animated and moving although it is not a tale but a purely logical movement. Prefaces p. 45

Vigilius Haufniensis says the same thing in The Concept of Anxiety,

How sin came into the world each man understands solely by himself. If he would learn it from another, he would misunderstand it. The only science that can help a little is psychology, yet it admits that it explains nothing, and also that it cannot and will not explain more. If any science could explain it everything would be confused. p. 51

== Criticism ==
Georg Brandes discussed both Heiberg and Kierkegaard in his 1886 book, Eminent Authors of the Nineteenth Century. Literary Portraits

Though he started in his general aesthetic views on the career pointed out by Heiberg, he nevertheless struck ere long into his own independent course. Heiberg was only a moralist in the name of true culture and of good taste; Paludan-Muller became one in the name of stern religious discipline. In religious questions, Heiberg had espoused the cause of Hegelian speculative Christianity; Paludan-Muller became an orthodox theologian. Thus his path for not an inconsiderable distance ran parallel with that of Søren Kierkegaard. Not that he was in any way influenced by this solitary thinker. He cherished but little sympathy for him, and was repelled by his broad, unclassical form, for whose merits he had no comprehension, and whose inner harmony with the mind of the author he did not perceive. It was the general spirit of the times which produced the intellectual harmony of these two solitary chastisers of their contemporaries. p. 321

Kierkegaard speaks of the "cultured" in this way, "For the cultured it is truly too little to have to deal with an individual human being, even though that human being is himself. He does not want to be disturbed when he is to be built up, does not want to be reminded of all the trifles, of individuals, of himself, because to forget all this is precisely the upbuilding."

Christianity can hardly be said to have been a big success when it originally entered the world, inasmuch as it began with crucifixion, flogging, and the like. But God knows whether it actually wants to be a big success in the world. I rather think that it is ashamed of itself, like an old man who sees himself rigged out in the latest fashion. Or, more correctly, I think it focuses its wrath against people when it sees this distorted figure that is supposed to be Christianity, a perfume-saturated and systematically accommodated and soiree-participating scholarliness, whose whole secret is half measures and then truth to a certain degree-when it sees a radical cure (and only as such is it what it is) transmogrified nowadays into a vaccination, and a person’s relation to it equivalent to having a certificate of vaccination. No, the Christian paradox is not some sort of this and that, something strange and yet not so strange; its truth is not like Salomon Goldfalb’s opinion: much fore and aft, yes und no also. Nor is faith something everyone has, and something that every cultured person might go beyond. If it can be grasped and held fast by the simplest of people, it is only the more difficult for the cultured to attain. What a wondrous, inspiring, Christian humanity: the highest is common for all human beings, and the most fortunately gifted are only the ones subjected to the most rigorous discipline. Søren Kierkegaard, Concluding Postscript, 1846, p. 293-294 Hong

== Sources ==
=== Primary sources ===
- Prefaces/Writing Sampler, Light Reading For People in Various Estates According to Time and Opportunity, by Nicolaus Notabene, Edited and Translated by Todd W. Nichol, 1997, Princeton University Press

=== Secondary sources ===
- Eminent authors of the nineteenth century. Literary portraits (1886) by Georg Brandes Brandes references Kierkegaard quite often in this book.
- Anthony D Storm's Commentary on Soren Kierkegaard, Prefaces
