= Edifying Discourses in Diverse Spirits =

1847 book by Søren Kierkegaard

- Author: Søren Kierkegaard
- Original title: Opbyggelige Taler i forskjellig Aand
- Working title: Upbuilding Discourses in Various Spirits
- Translators: Douglas V. Steere, David F. Swenson, A.S Aldworth and W.S. Ferrie, and Howard V. Hong and Edna H. Hong
- Language: Danish
- Subject: Christianity
- Published: March 13, 1847
- Publication place: Denmark
- English publication date: 1938 – first translation, 1955, 1993, last translation 2009
- Media type: Paperback
- Pages: 442
- ISBN: 9780691140773
- Preceded by: Two Ages: A Literary Review
- Followed by: Works of Love

Edifying Discourses in Diverse Spirits (Danish: Opbyggelige Taler i forskjellig Aand, also known as Upbuilding Discourses in Various Spirits) is an 1847 book by Søren Kierkegaard. Like many of his other books, this one is split into three parts. Kierkegaard had been working toward creating a place for the concepts of guilt and sin in the conscience of the single individual. He discussed the ideas generated by both Johann von Goethe and Friedrich Hegel concerning reason and nature. This book is his response to the ideas that nature and reason are perfect.

The first part of the book challenges those who say they are not guilty of anything, the second to do with the idea that nature is perfect, and the third to discuss the concept of the abstract and the concrete examples.

== Structure ==
Walter Lowrie translated The Point of View of My Work as an Author by Kierkegaard in 1939 and 1962 and included My Activity as a Writer by Soren Kierkegaard (1851) in the book, in which Kierkegaard wrote:

I attached myself again religiously to "that individual", to whom the next essential work (after the Concluding Postscript) was dedicated. I refer to Edifying Discourses in Divers Spirits, or rather the first part of that book which is an exhortation to confession. Perhaps nobody noticed it the first time I employed the category "that individual", and nobody paid much attention to the fact that it was repeated in stereotyped form in the preface of every number of the Edifying Discourses. Religiously speaking, there is no such thing as a public, but only individuals; for religion is seriousness and seriousness is the individual.

=== What we Learn from the Lilies in the Field and from the Birds in the Air ===
The first discourse (To Be Contented with Being a Human Being) deals with comparison and choice and how to trust God with the choice once made. He may have been echoing Goethe's Propylaen in which Goethe had written, "The youth, when Nature and Art attract him, thinks that with a vigorous effort he can soon penetrate into the innermost sanctuary; the man, after long wanderings, finds himself still in the outer court. Such an observation has suggested our title. It is only on the step, in the gateway, the entrance, the vestibule, the space between the outside and the inner chamber, between the sacred and the common, that we may ordinarily tarry with our friends." Kierkegaard writes about nature similarly to Goethe because both see it as teachers of humankind, and Kierkegaard wrote about "the inner being", or the soul.

The second discourse deals with diverting oneself from worries by "learning from the bird how glorious it is to be a human being." David F. Swenson translated several of Kierkegaard's discourses, which were published in 1958, through the efforts of Paul L Holmer. Kierkegaard wrote The Glory of Our Common Humanity. This was the second of three discourses that were all based on the text from Matthew 6 verses 24 to the end. It was titled How Glorious It Is to Be a Human Being by Howard V Hong when he translated Kierkegaard's book in 1993.

Kierkegaard wrote about the gift given to human beings that nature does not have: conscience. With the use of conscience we can know about time and the future. Something nature cannot know. He sums the human ability to love and the distinctiveness of nature up in Works of Love, which he published four months later.

The third discourse is titled What Blessed Happiness is Promised in Being a Human Being by Hong, in which he describes Kierkegaard stresses the importance there is in being a human being instead of a beast.

=== The Gospel of Sufferings ===
A.S Aldworth and W.S. Ferrie from Cambridge University translated The Gospel of Sufferings in 1955. His first three texts are from Luke 14:27 ("Whoever does not carry his cross and come after me cannot be my disciple"), Matthew 11:30 ("My yoke is beneficial, and my burden light. and It is said of him the Lord Jesus Christ: Although he was a son, he learned obedience from what he suffered"), and Hebrews 5:8. Kierkegaard writes about why it might not be so great to have the "distinction" of being an apostle.

== Criticism ==
Edifiying Discourses in Diverse Spirits, also Upbuilding Discourses in Various Spirits was published on March 13, 1847, and is one of the first books in Kierkegaard's second authorship.

The first section was translated into English in 1938 by Douglas V. Steere and titled Purity of Heart Is To Will One Thing. Steere also wrote the introduction to David F Swenson's 1946 translation of Works of Love. Howard V. and Edna H. Hong translated all the discourses and Princeton University Press published them in 1993. Scholars generally paid more attention to his pseudonymous writings than his discourses.

Harold Victor Martin published Kierkegaard, the Melancholy Dane (1950) and said in regards to the book:

The personal religious sense of Repetition in relation to time and eternity is brought out by Kierkegaard in a striking Discourse entitled: The Joy of it—that what thou dost lose temporally, thou dost gain eternally. Within his temporal existence, man can only lose the temporal temporally. The seriousness of life is that it is possible for man in his temporal existence to lose the eternal; and this in fact is Kierkegaard's definition of sin—in time to lose eternity. What man must strive after is to gain the eternal eternally. p. 60

Douglas V. Steere wrote a long introduction to his 1938 publication of the first part of Upbuilding Discourses in Various Spirits. Purify your Heart of 1937 became Purity of Heart is to Will One Thing in the hands of Steere in 1938. He says Eduard Geismar (1871–1939), the Danish scholar, said of the book, "It seems to me that nothing that he has written has sprung so directly out of his relationship with God as this address. Anyone who wishes to understand Kierkegaard properly will do well to begin with it."

Three Discourses on Imagined Occasions and Upbuilding Discourses in Various Spirits were reviewed together in 1994 by Karl Dusza for First Things Magazine. He wrote:

If the age of Kierkegaard was the age of individualism, is our own not the age of super-individualism? If the age of Kierkegaard was also the age of romanticism, is ours not the age of super-romanticism? And if in a deeper sense Kierkegaard's age was neither that of individualism nor that of romanticism but rather in essence the age of the crowd, what is our own if not the age of the super-crowd? How fortunate for us, then, that this solitary Dane exercised his awesome analytical and rhetorical skills to tear down the veil of deception and uncover the essential folly of his time, and in so doing, bequeathed to us powerful critical tools. He has indeed left us a mirror; peering into it, we can see the folly of our time and glimpse the abyss we are in danger of falling into.

— Appropriating the Paradox,
