= Writing Sampler =

Book by Søren Kierkegaard

Writing Sampler was an unpublished work by the Danish philosopher Søren Kierkegaard. The pseudonymous author attached to the Sampler is A.B.C.D.E.F. Godthaab. Sampler was intended to be a sequel to the Prefaces which was published in 1844. It was translated and published posthumously in English in 1997.

Writing Sampler was intended to emphasize the ironic and satirical elements of the Prefaces. It is also a historical social commentary of life in Copenhagen in the 1840s, and it references people and events of note at the time. In particular, it focuses on the relationship between the esthetic and religious stages of life.

What I write, then, in this book, which is not actually a book, is intended to draw your favorable attention to me. In the old days, one initially wrote a work by which one sought to gain prominence, but now the task is so manifold that competence in everything is required. ... a person does best these days by producing a sampler or a style book to qualify himself and to draw the public's attention to himself before he chooses this way of making a living and settles down as an author...

— A.B.C.D.E.F. Godthaab, Writing Sampler
