= Judge for Yourselves! =

Book by Søren Kierkegaard

- Author: Søren Kierkegaard
- Publication date: 1876

Judge for Yourselves! (subtitle: For Self-Examination, Recommended to the Present Age, Second Series) is a work by Danish philosopher Søren Kierkegaard. It was written as part of Kierkegaard's second authorship and published posthumously in 1876. This work is a continuation of For Self-Examination. This work continues a critique of Christendom, Christianity as a social and political entity, and its cultural accommodation. Kierkegaard discusses Bishop Jacob Mynster as a representative of Christendom and one of the main reasons Judge for Yourselves! was not published in Kierkegaard's lifetime was of his personal respect for Mynster.

Imitation, the imitation of Christ, is really the point from which the human race shrinks. The main difficulty lies here; here is where it is decided whether or not one is willing to accept Christianity. If there is emphasis on this point, the stronger the emphasis the fewer the Christians. If there is a scaling down at this point (so that Christianity becomes, intellectually, a doctrine) more people enter into Christianity. If it is abolished completely (so Christianity becomes, existentially, as easy as mythology and poetry and imitation an exaggeration, a ludicrous exaggeration), then Christianity spreads to such a degree that Christendom and the world are almost indistinguishable, or all become Christians; Christianity has completely conquered – that is, it is abolished!

— Søren Kierkegaard, Judge for Yourselves! in Essential Kierkegaard, p. 406
