= David F. Swenson =

Swedish writer & translator (1876-1940)

David Ferdinand Swenson (October 29, 1876 – February 11, 1940) was a Swedish-born American translator and an authority on the life and writings of the Danish philosopher Søren Kierkegaard.

== Work ==
Swenson is best known as the first of the translators of the works of Danish writer Soren Kierkegaard into the English language. He was born in Kristinehamn, Sweden and moved to Minnesota with his parents in 1882, when he was 6 years old. He was educated in the public schools of Minneapolis and in 1894 entered the University of Minnesota. Upon graduation he was offered a position as assistant professor in the department of philosophy at that same university. By 1917 Swenson had progressed to the rank of full professor.

His interest in Kierkegaard began in 1901 when he was looking through the books in the city library and came across a thick book about the size of Kant's Critique of Pure Reason and decided to read it. The book was Soren Kierkegaard's 1846 book Concluding Unscientific Postscript to Philosophical Fragments in Danish. Swenson enjoyed it so much that he devoted the rest of his life to making Kierkegaard's writings available to the English reading public. Most Kierkegaard scholars read Swenson's translations before Howard V. and Edna H. Hong translated Kierkegaard again and started the Hong Kierkegaard Library.

Swenson taught a course on Great Thinkers of the Nineteenth Century in 1914 and introduced Soren Kierkegaard to his audience. Later he contributed an article about Kierkegaard in 1916 to The Philosophical Review and a monograph about him for Scandinavian Studies and Notes in 1921.

Swenson's translation of Kierkegaard's Philosophical Fragments in 1936 was reviewed by The International Journal of Ethics in 1937. The reviewer said Swenson "rendered the English-reading public a distinguished service" in translating the work. Swenson's translation of Either/Or was reviewed in 1945 and his translation of Works of Love was reviewed in 1947. Kierkegaardian scholar Robert L. Perkins noted both the value of Swenson's translations in some of his works.

Swenson's goal was to make the writings of Soren Kierkegaard known to the English reading public. He and his wife, Lillian Marvin Swenson, translated many of Kierkegaard's works into English before David died in 1940. Lillian continued David's work with another Kierkegaard scholar, Walter Lowrie until her death in 1961. They were married in 1912 and she also graduated from The University of Minnesota, in 1898.

== Bibliography ==
- Philosophical Fragments by Soren Kierkegaard 1936 translation
- Concluding Unscientific Postscript by Soren Kierkegaard 1941 translation
- Thoughts on crucial situations in human life; three discourses on imagined occasions, by Søren Kierkegaard 1941 translation
- Edifying Discourses by Søren Kierkegaard in 4 volumes 1943-1945 translation
- Either/or; a fragment of life, by Soren Kierkegaard 1944 translation
