= Two Upbuilding Discourses (1844) =

1844 book by Søren Kierkegaard

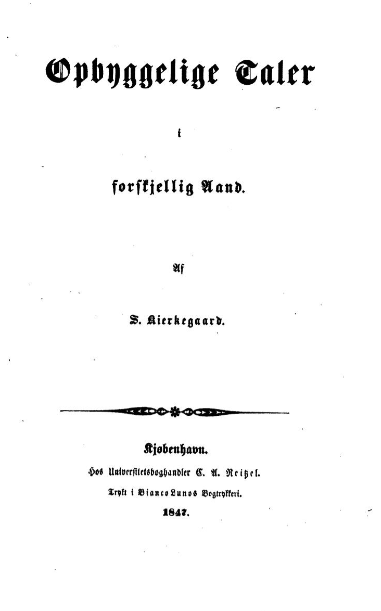
- Author: Søren Kierkegaard
- Original title: To opbyggelige Taler
- Language: Danish
- Series: First authorship (Discourses)
- Genre: Christianity, philosophy
- Publisher: Bookdealer P. G. Philipsen
- Publication date: March 5, 1844
- Publication place: Denmark
- English publication date: 1945 – first translation
- Pages: 24
- Preceded by: Four Upbuilding Discourses, 1843
- Followed by: Three Upbuilding Discourses, 1844

Two Upbuilding Discourses (1844) is a book by Søren Kierkegaard.

== History ==
Kierkegaard wrote the Eighteen Upbuilding Discourses in 1843–1844. These discourses were translated from Danish to English in the 1940s, from Danish to German in the 1950s, and then to English again in 1990. These discourses were published along with Kierkegaard's pseudonymous works.

== Structure ==
His Two Upbuilding Discourses of 1844 are:

- "To Preserve One's Soul in Patience"
- "Patience in Expectation"

=== "To Preserve One's Soul in Patience" ===
Kierkegaard stressed the value of patience in expectancy when facing life situations in these two short essays.

He provides examples of how different people react to danger and anxiety. He regards the single individual very highly and says, "Let us praise what is truly praiseworthy, the glory of human nature; let us give thanks that it was granted also to us to be human beings."

Kierkegaard provides three examples of people reacting to anxiety and despair, all of them as praiseworthy as the physical endurance to defeat an external enemy.

This act of self-discovery is the essence of what Kierkegaard wrote about. He says, "People are prone to pay attention to earthly dangers but these are external dangers. Kierkegaard says, we need to preserve something internal; our souls."

=== "Patience in Expectation" ===
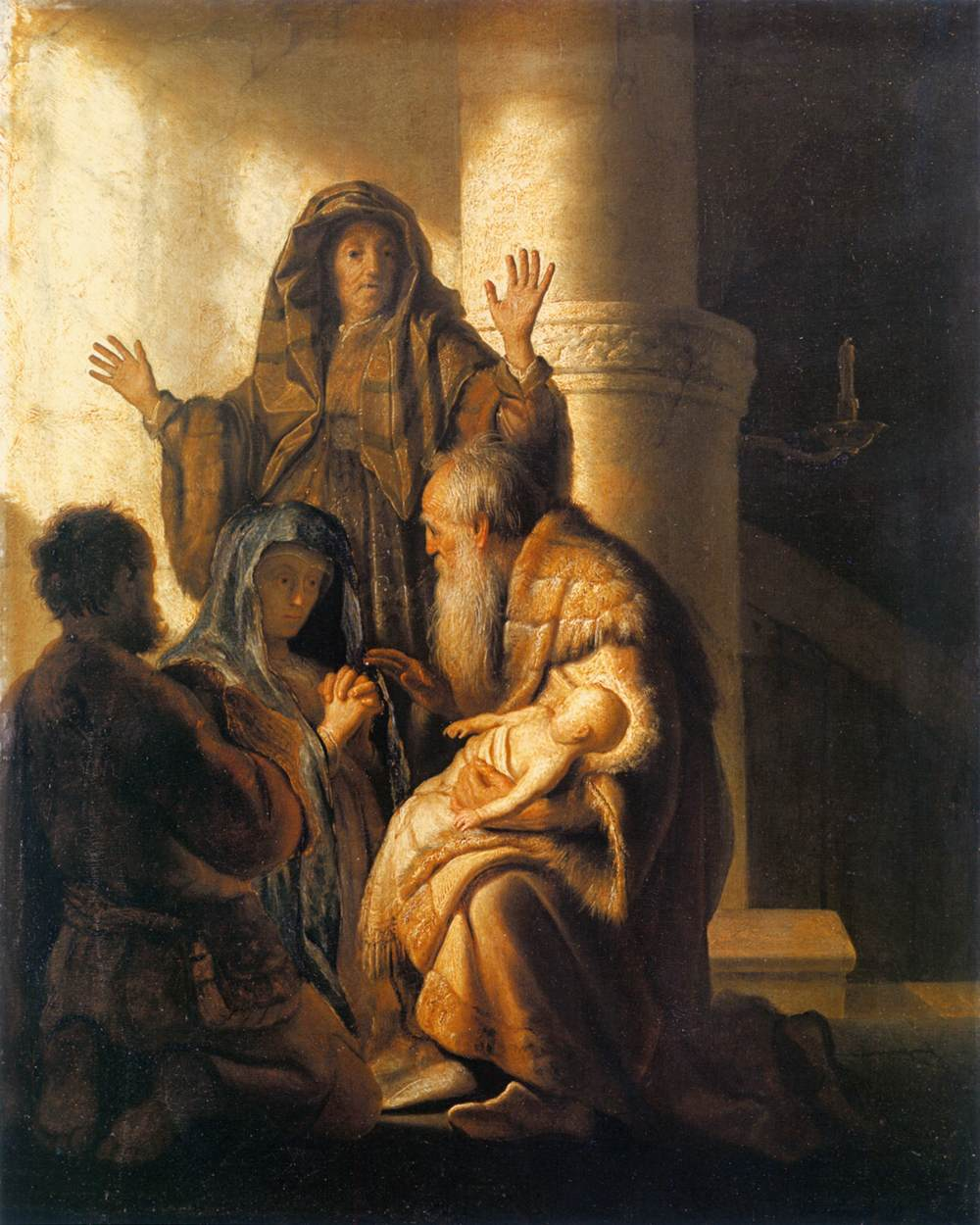
Is Anna not patient in her expectancy? Even though in the world we hear at times of someone who expects nothing at all, even though such a person is sometimes thought to have attained the proper assurance, because he craftily made it impossible for himself to discern the loss, yet it is also admitted that this wisdom is of later origin, and that no one has it in early youth. Originally, like every other human being he was expectant. With a smile or with tears, one confesses that expectancy is in the soul originally. Eighteen Upbuilding Discourses, Patience in Expectation, p. 220

Kierkegaard's intention in the preceding discourse was to speak as if patience were outside a person.

== Criticism ==
These discourses were translated by David F. Swenson in the mid-1940s. He wrote in his preface to this discourse: "The discourses appearing in the present volume constitute the fourth and fifth groups in the series of eighteen devotional addresses, and both groups were published in 1844. It may be of some interest to consider more particularly than has hitherto been done, the plan and purpose of these productions, paralleling as they do in time of publication the publication of the esthetic works. Unlike the latter, these addresses were published under Kierkegaard's own name, because as religious works he assumed personal responsibility for the views expressed, since their purpose was to indicate that from the beginning his writing had a religious motivation and plan, of which the esthetic works were also a part."

David J. Gouwens, Professor of Theology at Brite Divinity School, says that Kierkegaard was always more interested in the "how" than in the "why". Robert L. Perkins has termed Kierkegaard’s “second authorship”, with respect to the straightforward religious literature published (with some exceptions) under Kierkegaard’s own name after Concluding Unscientific Postscript (1846).

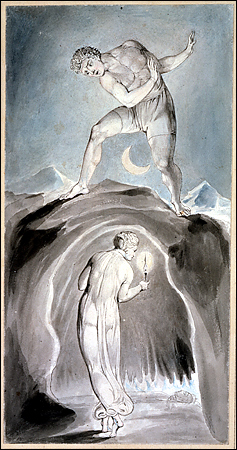
William Blake - The Soul Exploring the Recesses of the Grave ~ "The more a person weans his soul from understanding the imperfect to grasping the perfect, the more he will appropriate the explanation of life that comforts while it is day and remains with him when night comes, when he lies forgotten in his grave and has himself forgotten what moth and rust have consumed and human sagacity has found out, and yet he will have a thought that can fill out the long interval for him, that will know nothing of the difference that troubled him but is aware only of the equality that is from above, the equality in love, which lasts and is the only thing that lasts, the equality that does not allow any human being to be another’s debtor, except as Paul says, in the one debt, the debt of loving one another." Eighteen Upbuilding Discourses p. 158

== Sources ==
=== Primary sources ===
- Eighteen Upbuilding Discourses, by Søren Kierkegaard, Princeton University Press. Hong, 1990
- Edifying Discourses, by Søren Kierkegaard, Vol. III, Translated from the Danish by David F. Swenson and Lillian Marvin Swenson, Augsburg Publishing House, Minneapolis, Minnesota, 1945
- Søren Kierkegaard: Papers and Journals, translated with and introduction and notes by Alistair Hannay, 1996, Penguin Books
- Either/Or Volume I Edited by Victor Eremita, February 20, 1843, translated by David F. Swenson and Lillian Marvin Swenson Princeton University Press 1971
- Either/Or. Part II Translated by Howard and Edna Hong. Princeton, 1988, ISBN 978-0-691-02041-9
- Concluding Unscientific Postscript to Philosophical Fragments Volume I, by Johannes Climacus, edited by Søren Kierkegaard, Copyright 1846 – Edited and Translated by Howard V. Hong and Edna H. Hong 1992 Princeton University Press
- The Point of View of My Work as An Author: A Report to History, by Søren Kierkegaard, written in 1848, published in 1859 by his brother Peter Kierkegaard Translated with introduction and notes by Walter Lowrie, 1962 Harper Torchbooks

=== Secondary sources ===
- Something about Kierkegaard, By David F. Swenson, Mercer University Press, 2000, originally published 1941 and 1945, Augsburg Publishing House
- Kierkegaard as religious thinker By David J. Gouwens, Cambridge University Press, 1996
- Quotations related to Two Upbuilding Discourses (1844) at Wikiquote
