= Concluding Unscientific Postscript to Philosophical Fragments =

Work by Søren Kierkegaard

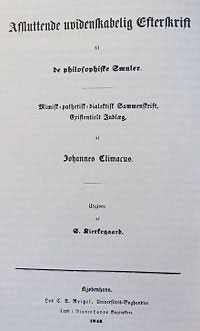
- Titlepage, first edition
- Author: Søren Kierkegaard
- Original title: Afsluttende uvidenskabelig Efterskrift til de philosophiske Smuler
- Translator: David F Swenson and Walter Lowrie, Howard V. Hong and Edna H. Hong, Alastair Hannay
- Language: Danish
- Series: First authorship (pseudonymous)
- Genre: Philosophy
- Publisher: University bookshop Reitzel, Copenhagen
- Publication date: Feb 28, 1846
- Publication place: Denmark
- English publication date: 1941
- Media type: Hardback
- Pages: 630 (Hong translation)
- ISBN: 978-0691020815
- Preceded by: Stages on Life's Way
- Followed by: Two Ages: A Literary Review

Concluding Unscientific Postscript to the Philosophical Fragments (Danish: Afsluttende uvidenskabelig Efterskrift til de philosophiske Smuler, more accurately translated as Concluding Unscientific Postscript to the Philosophical Crumbs) is a major work by Søren Kierkegaard. The work is an attack against Hegelianism, the philosophy of Hegel, and particularly Hegel's Science of Logic. The work is also famous for its dictum, "subjectivity is truth". It was an attack on what Kierkegaard saw as Hegel's deterministic philosophy. Against Hegel's system, Kierkegaard is often interpreted as taking the side of metaphysical libertarianism or free will, though it has been argued that an incompatibilist conception of free will is not essential to Kierkegaard's formulation of existentialism.

Concluding Unscientific Postscript to the Philosophical Fragments is a sequel to the earlier Philosophical Fragments. Despite the title of the work, Postscript is almost five times larger than the original work. The pseudonym "Johannes Climacus" is credited as the author and Kierkegaard as an editor. Like his other pseudonymous works, Postscript is not a reflection of Kierkegaard's own beliefs. However, unlike his other pseudonymous works, Kierkegaard attaches his name to this work by crediting himself as an editor.

== Overview ==
When I began as an author of Either/Or, I no doubt had a far more profound impression of the terror of Christianity than any clergyman in the country. I had a fear and trembling such as perhaps no one else had. Not that I therefore wanted to relinquish Christianity. No, I had another interpretation of it. For one thing I had in fact learned very early that there are men who seem to be selected for suffering, and, for another thing, I was conscious of having sinned much and therefore supposed that Christianity had to appear to me in the form of this terror. But how cruel and false of you, I thought, if you use it to terrify others, perhaps upset every so many happy, loving lives that may very well be truly Christian.

It was as alien as it could possibly be to my nature to want to terrify others, and therefore I both sadly and perhaps also a bit proudly found my joy in comforting others and in being gentleness itself to them-hiding the terror in my own interior being.

So my idea was to give my contemporaries (whether or not they themselves would want to understand) a hint in humorous form (in order to achieve a lighter tone) that a much greater pressure was needed-but then no more; I aimed to keep my heavy burden to myself, as my cross. I have often taken exception to anyone who was a sinner in the strictest sense and then promptly got busy terrifying others. Here is where Concluding Postscript comes in.

— Søren Kierkegaard, Journal and Papers, VI 6444 (Pap. X1 A541) (1849) (Either/Or Part II, Hong, p. 451-452)

== Structure ==
Objectivity	Subjectivity
Objective truth is that which relates to propositions, that which has no relation to the existence of the knower. History, science, and speculative philosophy all deal with objective knowledge. According to Climacus, all objective knowledge is subject to doubt. Focuses on what is asserted.	Subjective truth is essential or ethico-religious truth. It is not composed of propositions or perceptions of the external world, but of introspection, experiences, and especially one's relationship with God.
Direct communication consists of statements that can be communicated and understood without appropriation, that is, without experiencing personally what is being communicated. Objective knowledge can be communicated directly.	Indirect communication requires appropriation on the part of the receiver. The receiver must experience or have experienced what is being communicated, not just hear it.

== Reception ==
Eduard Geismar was an early lecturer on the works of Soren Kierkegaard. He gave lectures at Princeton Theological Seminary in March 1936 and states this about Johannes Climacus:

Johannes Climacus has so delineated the ethico-religious life that Christianity becomes an intensification of subjectivity and its pathos. Through the discipline of resignation, aiming at an absolute commitment to the highest good, through the discipline of suffering, through the consciousness of guilt, the way leads step by step to a more profound pathos, until by a leap we reach the absolute maximum of subjectivity in the Christian consciousness of sin, with its imperative need for a new departure. The Christian revelation is not a set of propositions, but a creative act of the individual who has been prepared to receive it in part by the very discipline of human idealism, and who through this creative act becomes a new creature. But no birth is without birth-pangs and no revelation is without an experience of suffering. The way to Christianity goes through a decision, a crucial decision in the temporal moment; faith is an existential leap. The necessity of this leap is what gives offense to man and to all human idealism. Eduard Geismar, Lectures on the Religious Thought of Soren Kierkegaard, p. 57 Augsburg Publishing House, Minneapolis 1937

Walter Lowrie characterized Kierkegaard's authorship up to Concluding Postscript as first "Away from the Aesthetical" and then the works ascribed to Johannes Climacus as "Away from Speculation".

Emil Brunner mentioned Kierkegaard 51 times in his 1937 book Man in Revolt and wrote a semi-serious parody of Kierkegaard's idea of truth as subjectivity by making truth objectivity in 1947.

The phrase Everything is relative is spoken emphatically by the very people for whom the atom or its elements are still the ultimate reality. Everything is relative, they say, but at the same time they declare as indubitable truth that the mind is nothing but a product of cerebral processes. This combination of gross objectivism and bottomless subjectivism represents a synthesis of logically irreconcilable, contradictory principles of thought, which is equally unfortunate from the point of view of philosophical consistency and from that ethical and cultural value. Apart from this last sceptical stage, it must be said that modern spiritual evolution has been taking unambiguously the line of a more or less materialistic objectivism. This chapter of human history could be headed — to parody Kierkegaard's phrase — The object is the truth!

It cannot, then, be a surprise to see man more and more engulfed in the object, in things, in material being, in economic life, in technics, in a one-sided, quantitative manner of thinking, and in quantitative standards of value. In the sphere of material being the quantum is the only differentiating factor. Material being is merely quantitative being. An objectivist understanding of truth expresses itself, therefore, not merely in terms of practical materialism, but also in a general quantification of all life, as it may be seen in the craving for records in sport, in pride in the growth of cities of millions of inhabitants, in respect for the multi-millionaire, in admiration for great political power. Reverence for the quantum is, so to speak, the new version of the worship of the golden calf. It is an inevitable consequence of the objectivist conception of truth: The object is the truth.

Herbert Read summarised Kierkegaard's book in his 1947 text, The Coat of Many Colors:

The Unscientific Postscript is but one more voluminous commentary on the main theme of all Kierkegaard’s work, the dilemma which he represented by the phrase “either-or”: either aesthetic immediacy, which includes not only the eudaemonistic search for pleasure, but also despair (the “sickness unto death”) and religious or metaphysical self-explanation; or the ethical along with the religion of immanence and immediacy and (as its culmination) Christianity apprehended as a paradox. In the Postscript Kierkegaard is chiefly concerned to define the nature of the religious alternative: to make it clear to his readers that it is not a choice between the aesthetic life and any sort of religion, but between true religion and every other possible alternative. And true religion is distinguished by its immediacy, without which it cannot live. Immediacy is opposed to reflection: it is direct apprehension, either by the senses or by intuition, and it is the only means by which we can apprehend “being“. Subjectivity is the truth”, and it is upon this basis that Christianity must be interpreted and believed. The Coat of Many Colors by Herbert Read p. 253

The question as to whether Kierkegaard was an existentialist was brought up by Libuse Lukas Miller. She wrote the following in 1957:

Kierkegaard, who is falsely hailed as the father of modern existentialism, used the existential “dialectic” never as an end in itself but always as an offensive and defensive weapon in a battle on behalf of the Christian faith deliberately planned to meet what he thought were the special apologetic and evangelistic needs of his historical situation, and, therefore, the Kierkegaardian existentialism should be regarded rather as the exception than the rule in existential philosophizing. And Kierkegaard himself should not be called the father of modern existentialism. The Christian and the World of Unbelief 1957 by Libuse Lukas Miller p. 78

In 1962 Jean T Wilde edited The Search For Being and included an excerpt from Kierkegaard's Concluding Postscript concerning Gotthold Lessing. Wilde says, "In the Concluding Postscript the question of "the objective problem concerning the truth of Christianity" is dealt with in the first part. Kierkegaard shows that neither historically nor speculatively can we have objective knowledge of Christianity's truth or of its untruth. He says "a logical system is possible, but an existential system is impossible."

In 1963 Kenneth Hamilton described Paul Tillich as an individual who was as anti-Hegel as Kierkegaard was. He was referring to Kierkegaard's distrust of system builders which he discussed in The Concluding Unscientific Postscript (p. 13-15, 106–112.)

The first total opponent of Hegel's standpoint was Soren Kierkegaard, father of modern existentialism. Hegel had many critics in his lifetime, but they were mostly those who attacked his system because they believed that they could construct a better one themselves. But his Danish critic attacked him for being the most consistent system-builder among system-builders. In the name of Christian faith Kierkegaard rejected not this or that element in Hegelianism but the whole, referring to it in mockery as the System. So it happens that the issue of system versus the Christian faith has been debated more than a hundred years ago. And that encounter between system and anti-system is very relevant to any examination of philosophical theology to-day. Certainly Tillich, who is often critical of Hegel, nearly always speaks in praise of Kierkegaard, and he gives such an important place in his own thinking to the category of existence that he seems at times to be travelling in the Danish thinker's footsteps. The System and the Gospel A Critique Of Paul Tillich by Kenneth Hamilton 1963 MacMillan Press p. 37

Anoop Gupta (b. 1969) discussed Kierkegaard's idea of truth in Kierkegaard's Romantic Legacy: Two Theories of the Self. 2005 (p. 19) Gupta said "what we need to understand is what Kierkegaard means by "truth". He does not think that mere facts (truth) set one free. For example, it is "true" that given certain purities of water and atmospheric pressures, water will boil at one hundred degrees Celsius. Of course, Kierkegaard does not think the realization of this truth will make one free. Rather, truth is something to be attained, actualized, lived. In short, truth is not some objective fact that we can look at disinterestedly, as a spectator in a laboratory. If we mobilize our freedom toward this end, toward self-becoming, we will be using our freedom to bring forth truth." (University of Ottawa Press)

Joseph H. Smith said that Kierkegaard shifts attention from (objective) truth to a question of function because there are other truths than propositions such as "truth of persons and how that truth corresponds to the content of professed beliefs." He thinks Kierkegaard is talking about the serious person always "having the honest suspicion of thyself."
