= Three Upbuilding Discourses, 1844 =

Book by Søren Kierkegaard

Three Upbuilding Discourses
- Author: Søren Kierkegaard
- Original title: Tre opbyggelige Taler
- Language: Danish
- Series: First authorship (Discourses)
- Genre: Christianity, philosophy
- Publisher: Bookdealer P. G. Philipsen
- Publication date: June 8, 1844
- Publication place: Denmark
- English publication date: 1945 – first translation
- Media type: paperback
- Pages: 70
- Preceded by: Two Upbuilding Discourses, 1844
- Followed by: Philosophical Fragments

Three Upbuilding Discourses (1844) is a book by Søren Kierkegaard.

== History ==
Kierkegaard published his Eighteen Upbuilding Discourses throughout 1843 and 1844. He followed the Socratic method by publishing his own view of life under his own name and different views of life under pseudonyms. His own view was that of "a committed Christian trained for the ministry".

== Sources ==
=== Primary sources ===
- Remember Now Thy Creator In the Days of Thy Youth Swenson translation
- The Expectation of an Eternal Happiness Swenson translation
- Eighteen Upbuilding Discourses, by Søren Kierkegaard, Princeton University Press. Hong, 1990
- Either/Or Part I, Edited by Victor Eremita, February 20, 1843, translated by David F. Swenson and Lillian Marvin Swenson Princeton University Press 1971
- Either/Or Part 2, Edited by Victor Eremita, February 20, 1843, Hong 1987
- Fear and Trembling; Copyright 1843 Søren Kierkegaard – Kierkegaard's Writings; 6 – copyright 1983 – Howard V. Hong
- Concluding Unscientific Postscript to Philosophical Fragments Volume I, by Johannes Climacus, edited by Søren Kierkegaard, Copyright 1846 – Edited and Translated by Howard V. Hong and Edna H. Hong 1992 Princeton University Press
- The Point of View for My Work as An Author: A Report to History, edited by Benjamin Neilson, by Søren Kierkegaard 1848, Translated with Introductory Notes by Walter Lowrie, 1962, Harper and Row Publishers
- Lectures on the philosophy of religion, together with a work on the proofs of the existence of God, by Wilhelm Friedrich Hegel, 1832, Translated from the 2d German ed. by E.B. Speirs, and J. Burdon Sanderson: the translation edited by E.B. Speirs. Published 1895 by K. Paul, Trench, Trubner in London
- Norway and the Norwegians, Volume 2 By Robert Gordon Latha CHAPTER XII and XIII. covers Holberg, Heiberg, Wessel and Steffens Chapter XIII Treschow —His writings — Anthropology — Eilschow., 1840, pp. 142–158

=== Secondary sources ===
- Stanford Encyclopedia of Philosophy - Søren Kierkegaard
- Stanford Encyclopedia of Philosophy - Existentialism
- Historical Dictionary of Kierkegaard's Philosophy, By Julie Watkin, Scarecrow Press, 2001
