= The Concept of Anxiety =

1844 philosophical work by Søren Kierkegaard

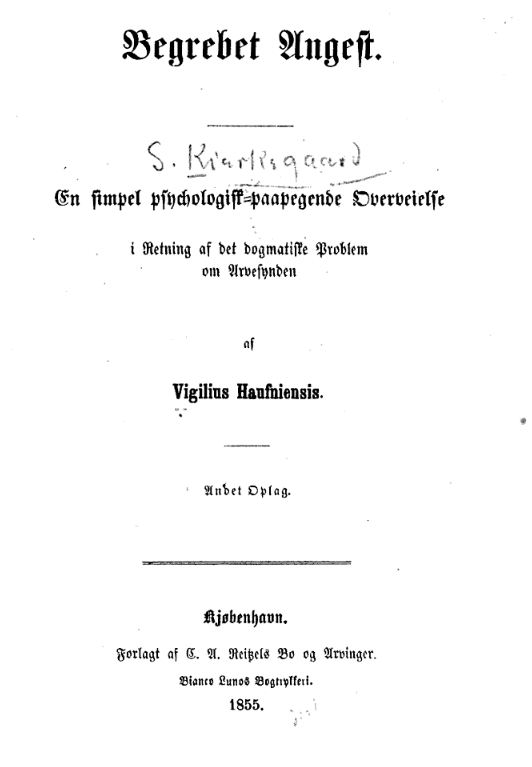
- Danish title page to The Concept of Anxiety
- Author: Søren Kierkegaard (as Vigilius Haufniensis)
- Original title: Begrebet Angest
- Translator: Reidar Thomte
- Language: Danish
- Subject: Christianity; psychology; theology
- Publication date: June 17, 1844
- Publication place: Denmark
- English publication date: 1946
- Media type: paperback
- Pages: ~162
- ISBN: 0-691-02011-6
- Preceded by: Prefaces
- Followed by: Four Upbuilding Discourses, 1844

The Concept of Anxiety: A Simple Psychologically Orienting Deliberation on the Dogmatic Issue of Hereditary Sin (Danish: Begrebet Angest. En simpel psychologisk-paapegende Overveielse i Retning af det dogmatiske Problem om Arvesynden) is a philosophical work written by Danish philosopher Søren Kierkegaard in 1844. It explores the concept of anxiety as it relates to human freedom, original sin, and existential choice.

The original 1944 English translation by Walter Lowrie (now out of print), was titled The Concept of Dread. The Concept of Anxiety was dedicated "to the late professor Poul Martin Møller". Kierkegaard used the pseudonym Vigilius Haufniensis (which, according to Josiah Thompson, is the Latin transcription for "the Watchman" of Copenhagen) for The Concept of Anxiety.

== Themes and analysis ==
The Concept of Anxiety was published on June 17, 1844, the same date as Prefaces' publication. Both books deal with Hegel's idea of mediation.

Kierkegaard mentions that anxiety is a way for humanity to be saved as well. Anxiety informs us of our choices, our self-awareness and personal responsibility, and brings us from a state of un-self-conscious immediacy to self-conscious reflection. (Jean-Paul Sartre calls these terms pre-reflective consciousness and reflective consciousness.)

== Progress ==
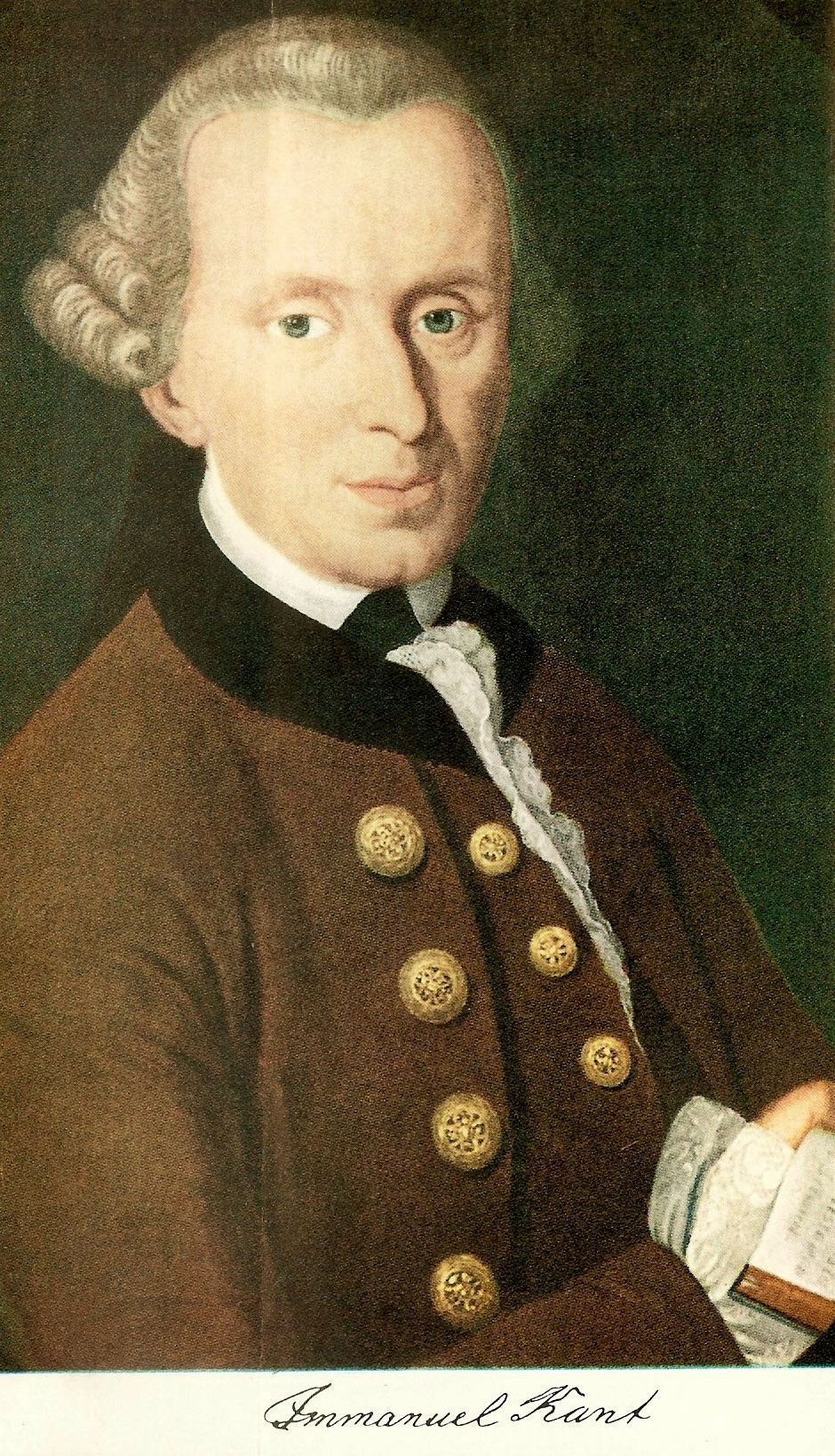
Immanuel Kant (1724–1804)

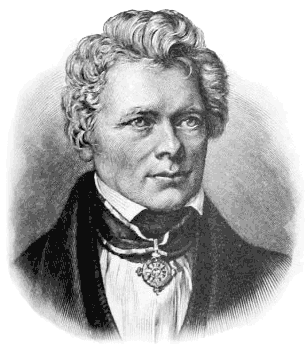
Friedrich Schelling (1775–1854)

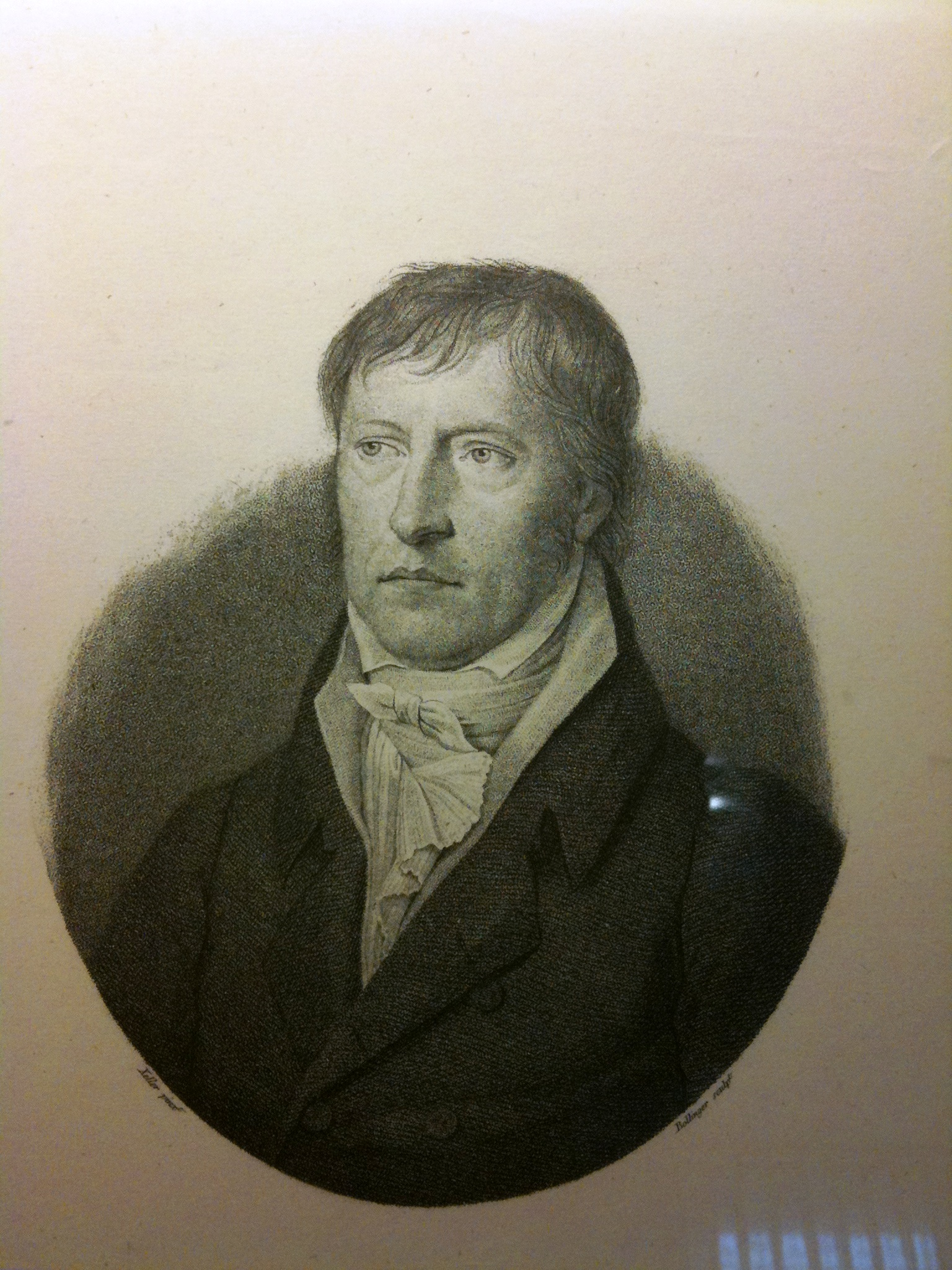
Georg Wilhelm Friedrich Hegel (1770–1831)

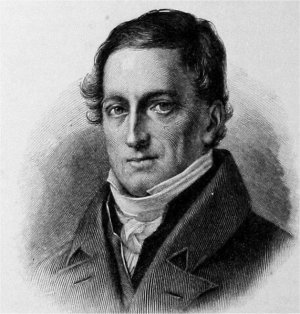
Johann Friedrich Herbart (1776–1841)

Friedrich Schelling wrote Philosophical Inquiries into the Essence of Human Freedom in 1809, Georg Wilhelm Friedrich Hegel wrote his Science of Logic between 1812 and 1816, and Johann Friedrich Herbart explored questions of pedagogy. All of them were discussing how good and evil come into existence. Kierkegaard questioned Hegel and Schelling's emphasis on the negative (evil) and aligned himself with Herbart's emphasis on the positive (good).

Kierkegaard states that "anxiety about sin produces sin". In Stages on Life's Way, he discusses repentance as "a recollection of guilt" and argues that "the ability to recollect is the condition for all productivity." He explains that if a person wishes to avoid being productive, they need only "remember the same thing that recollecting he wanted to produce, and production is rendered impossible."

Philosophers were involved with the dialectical question of exactly "how" an individual or group changes from good to evil or evil to good. Kierkegaard pressed forward with his category of "the single individual." In his journals, Kierkegaard interprets Peter's words "To whom shall we go?" as referring to Peter's consciousness of sin, suggesting that "it is this that binds a man to Christianity" and that God "determines every man's conflicts individually".

== Supernaturalism ==
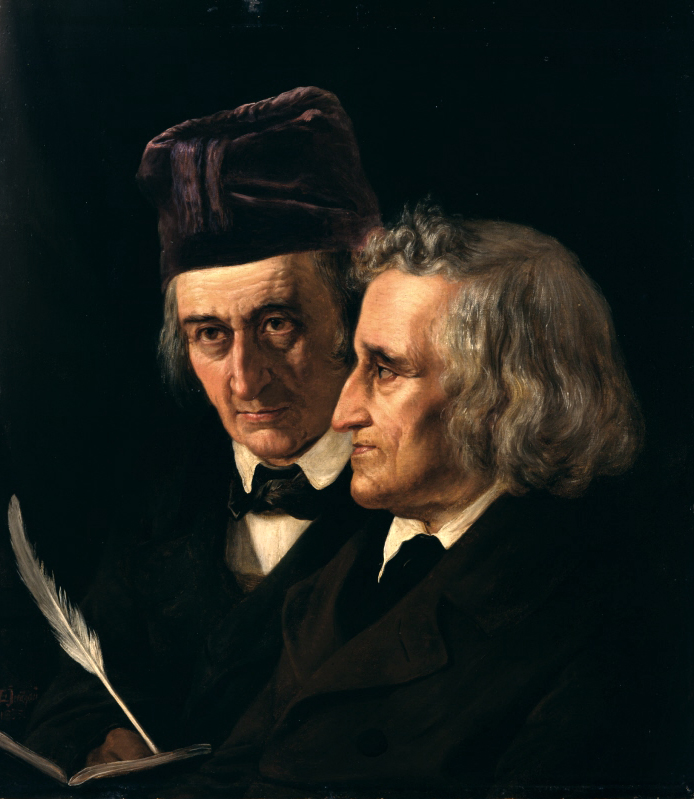
The Brothers Grimm

The Brothers Grimm wrote about the use of folktales as educational stories to keep individuals from falling into evil hands. Kierkegaard refers to The Story of the Youth Who Went Forth to Learn What Fear Was in The Concept of Anxiety (p. 155).

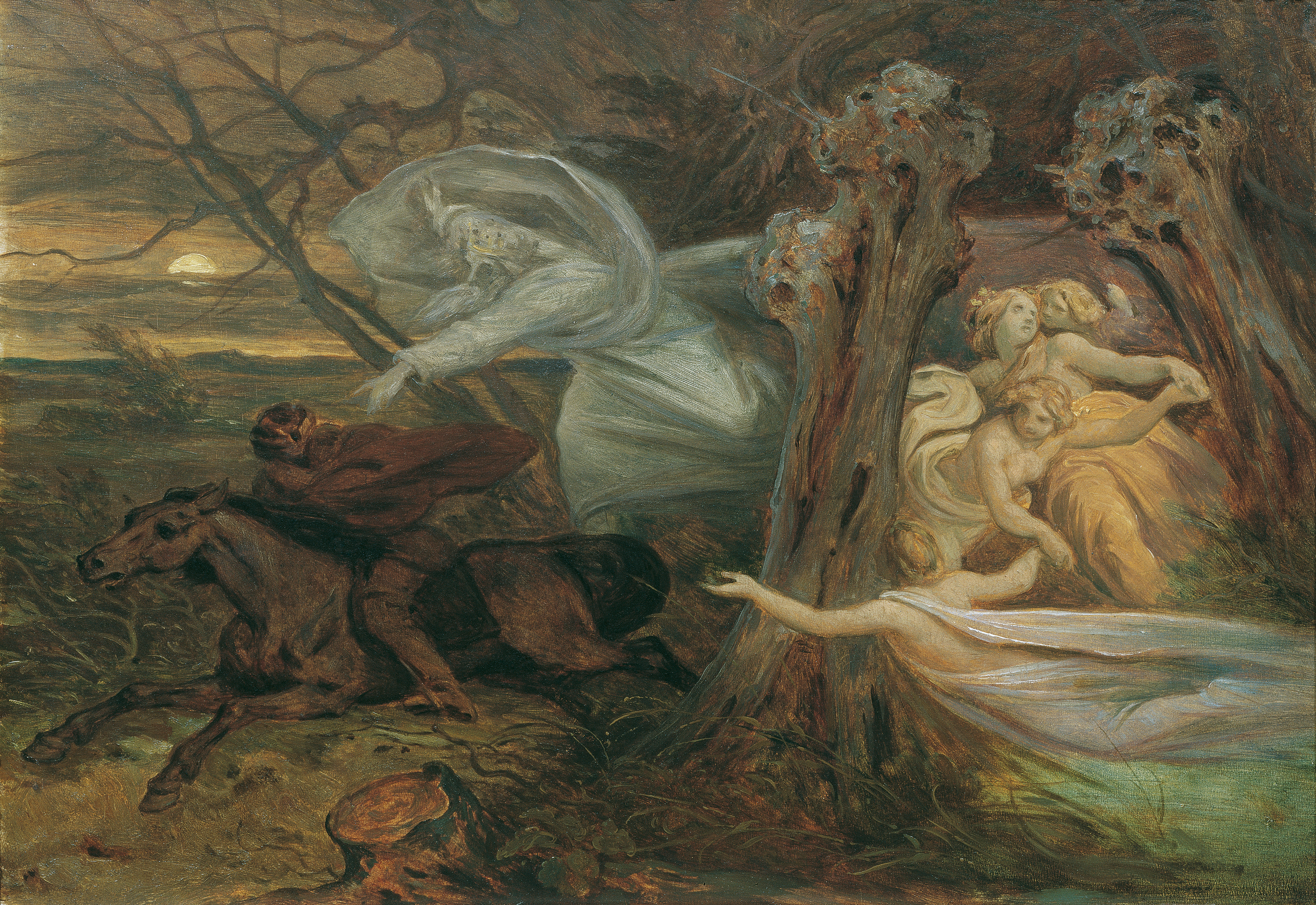
The Erlking

Kierkegaard felt that imaginative constructions should be upbuilding. He wrote about "the nothing of despair", God as the unknown is nothing, and death is a nothing. Goethe's Der Erlkönig and The Bride of Corinth (1797) are also nothing. Many things are hard to understand but Kierkegaard says, "Where understanding despairs, faith is already present in order to make the despair properly decisive."

== The first sin ==
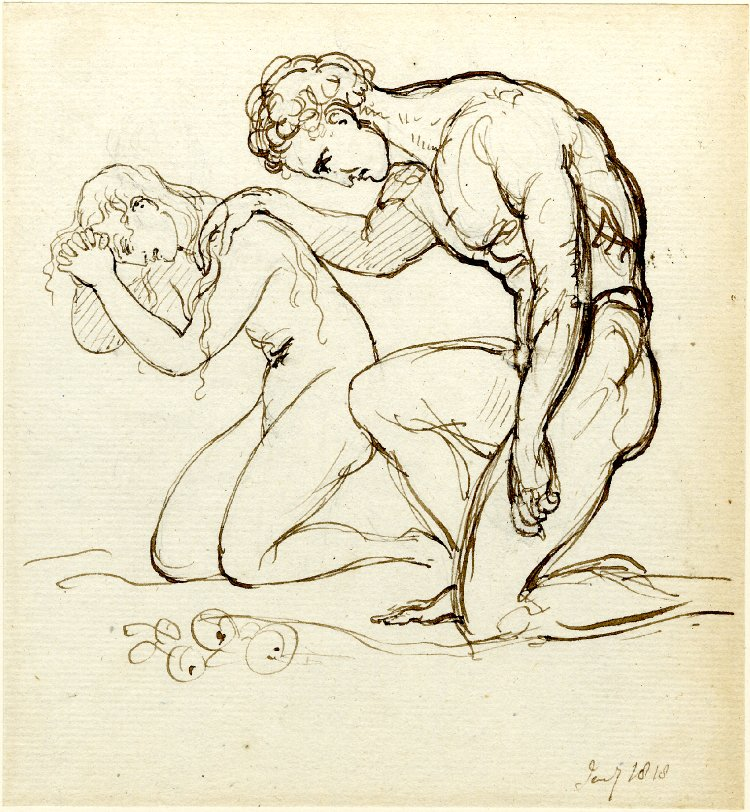
Adam and Eve

Kierkegaard is not concerned with what Eve's sin was; he says it was not sensuousness, but he is concerned with how Eve learned that she was a sinner. He says "consciousness presupposes itself". Eve became conscious of her first sin through her choice and Adam became conscious of his first sin through his choice. God's gift to Adam and Eve was the "knowledge of freedom" and they both decided to use it. In Kierkegaard's Journals he said, "the one thing needful" for the doctrine of Atonement to make sense was the "anguished conscience." He wrote, "Remove the anguished conscience, and you may as well close the churches and turn them into dance halls."

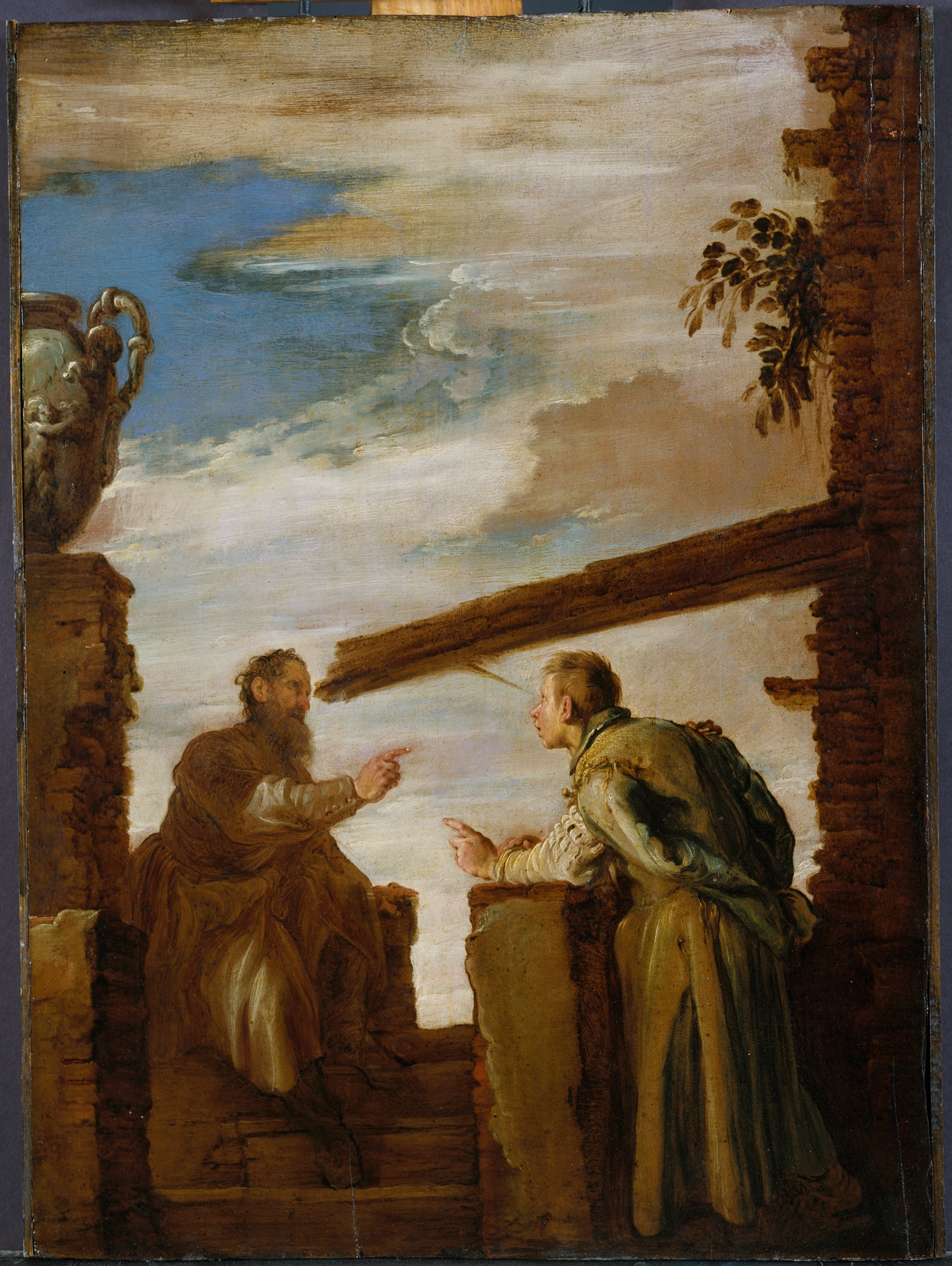
The Parable of the Mote and Beam

Kierkegaard says, every person has to find out for him or her self how guilt and sin came into their worlds. Kierkegaard argued about this in both Repetition and Fear and Trembling where he said philosophy must not define faith.

Kierkegaard observes that it was the prohibition itself not to eat of the tree of knowledge that gave birth to sin in Adam. He questions the doctrine of Original Sin, also called Ancestral sin., "The doctrine that Adam and Christ correspond to each other confuses things. Christ alone is an individual who is more than an individual. For this reason he does not come in the beginning but in the fullness of time." Sin has a "coherence in itself".

Kierkegaard also writes about an individual's disposition in The Concept of Anxiety. He was impressed with the psychological views of Johann Karl Friedrich Rosenkranz:

In Rosenkranz's Psychology there is definition of disposition [Gemyt]. On page 322 he says that disposition is the unity of feeling and self-consciousness. Then in preceding presentation he superbly explains "that the feeling unfolds itself to self-consciousness, and vice versa, that the content of the self-consciousness is felt by the subject as his own. It is only this unity that can be called disposition. If the clarity of cognition is lacking, knowledge of the feeling, there exists only the urge of the spirit of nature, the turgidity of immediacy. On the other hand, if feeling is lacking, there remains only the abstract concept that has not reached the last inwardness of the spiritual existence, that has not become one with the self of the spirit." (cf. pp. 320–321) If a person now turns back and pursues his definition of "feeling" as the spirit's immediate unity of its sentience and its consciousness (p. 142) and recalls that in the definition of Seelenhaftigkeit [sentience] account has been taken of the unity with the immediate determinants of nature, then by taking all this together he has the conception of a concrete personality. [but, Kierkegaard says] Earnestness and disposition correspond to each other in such a way that earnestness is a higher as well as the deepest expression for what disposition is. Disposition is the earnestness of immediacy, while earnestness, on the other hand, is the acquired originality of disposition, its originality preserved in the responsibility of freedom and its originality affirmed in the enjoyment of blessedness.

— Søren Kierkegaard, The Concept of Anxiety, p. 148

== Contemporary reception ==
Walter Lowrie translated The Concept of Dread in 1944. He was asked "almost petulantly" why it took him so long to translate the book. Alexander Dru had been working on the book, and Charles Williams hoped the book would be published along with The Sickness unto Death, which Lowrie was working on in 1939. After the war started, Dru was wounded and gave the job over to Lowrie. Lowrie could find no adequate word to use for Angst. Lee Hollander had used the word dread in 1924, a Spanish translator used angustia, and Miguel Unamuno, writing in French used agonie while other French translators used angoisse. Rollo May quoted Kierkegaard in his book Meaning of Anxiety, which is the relation between anxiety and freedom.

I would say that learning to know anxiety is an adventure which every man has to affront if he would not go to perdition either by not having known anxiety or by sinking under it. He therefore who has learned rightly to be anxious has learned the most important thing.— Kierkegaard, The Concept of Dread.

Robert Harold Boethius, in his 1948 book Christian Paths to Self-Acceptance, discusses Kierkegaard's concept of dread, explaining that the distorted doctrines of man's depravity from the Reformation and Protestant scholasticism are clarified by neo-orthodox theologians. While sin is often preached in undialectical forms, Kierkegaard offers a modern reinterpretation, linking sin to anxiety. He explains that "dread or anxiety" precedes sin, coming close to it but without fully explaining it, which only breaks forth through a "qualitative leap." Kierkegaard views this "sickness unto death" as central to human existence, teaching that a "synthesis" with God is necessary for resolving inner conflicts and achieving self-acceptance.

In 1958, George Laird Hunt interpreted Kierkegaard's writing as basically asking "How can we understand ourselves?" and wrote:

Kierkegaard views man’s humanity through his creatureliness, defined by his position between life and death. Made in God's image, man feels the presence of eternity but also knows his inevitable death. This tension creates his anguish and possibility of immortality. Man sins by avoiding faith and the uncertainty of existence, either denying death or rejecting eternity. He refuses to face the anguish of being both mortal and dependent on God. True humanness lies in acknowledging both life and death, which marks the beginning of redemption.

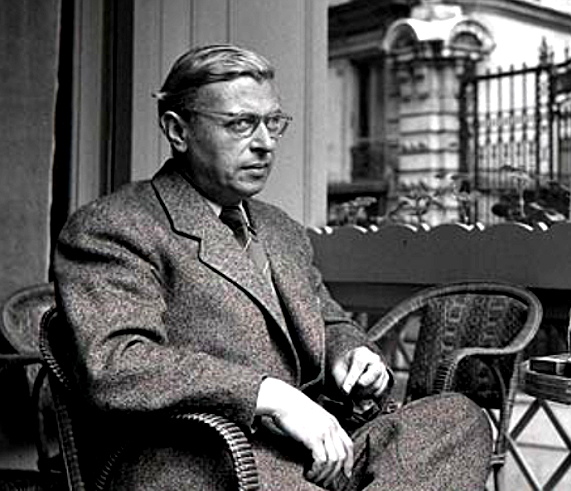
Jean-Paul Sartre

== See also ==
- Hans Urs von Balthasar
- René Descartes, Meditations on First Philosophy
