= Four Upbuilding Discourses, 1843 =

Book by Søren Kierkegaard

Four Upbuilding Discourses
- Author: Søren Kierkegaard
- Original title: Fire opbyggelige Taler
- Language: Danish
- Series: First authorship (Discourses)
- Genre: Christianity, philosophy
- Publisher: Bookdealer P. G. Philipsen
- Publication date: December 6, 1843
- Publication place: Denmark
- English publication date: 1944 – first translation
- Media type: Paperback
- Pages: 73
- ISBN: 0-691-02087-6
- Preceded by: Repetition (Kierkegaard)
- Followed by: Two Upbuilding Discourses, 1844

Four Upbuilding Discourses (FUD) is a book written by Søren Kierkegaard and published in December 1843.

== Analysis ==
The first discourse is on the subject of the life of Job, and the other three are exhortations to the reader to the virtues exhibited by Job: faith, patience, and gratitude.

Kierkegaard throughout employs a strategy of repetition. A few weeks before publishing the FUD Kierkegaard had published a tract entitled Repetition: A Venture in Experimenting Psychology.

=== Discourse 1: Job ===
The title of the first discourse is "The Lord gave, and the Lord took away; blessed be the name of the Lord." (Danish: "Herren gav, Herren tog, Herrens Navn wære lovet."), a verse from the Book of Job (Note: specifically Job 1 verse 21). The discourse recounts the story of Job's suffering, a topic shared with Repetition. This is the only discourse of the four where Job is explicitly mentioned.

=== Discourses 2, 3, and 4: virtues ===
The title of the second discourse is "Every good and every perfect gift comes from above." (Danish: "Al god Gave og al fuldkommen Gave er ovenfra.") and it deals with faith and doubt.

The third discourse deals with gratitude and generosity. It also touches upon the idea of equality, specifically that everyone is equal "before God". Written in the second person, addressing "you the reader" and stating that it is addressing someone who is already "favourably disposed" to the idea that gratitude and generosity actually are virtues in the first place, it comprises thirteen short stories of people going from lacking to exemplifying these virtues.

The title of the fourth and final discourse is "Gaining one's soul in patience." (Danish: "At erhverve sin Sjel i Taalmodighed.") and deals with patience. In the collected Eighteen Upbuilding Discourses this is followed by a second discourse on patience written in March 1844 and originally published in Kierkegaard's Two Upbuilding Discourses. "Gaining one's soul" ends on a question, in fact on nested questions as the concluding paragraph begins with this question-within-a-question:

Should we now ask, "Who described this conflict properly?" As if the proclamation were not always imperfect, and as if the proclamation were not always something other than the gain?

— Eighteen Upbuilding Discourses, p.175

== See also ==
- Christian ethics
