= On the Concept of Irony with Continual Reference to Socrates =

1841 master's thesis by Søren Kierkegaard

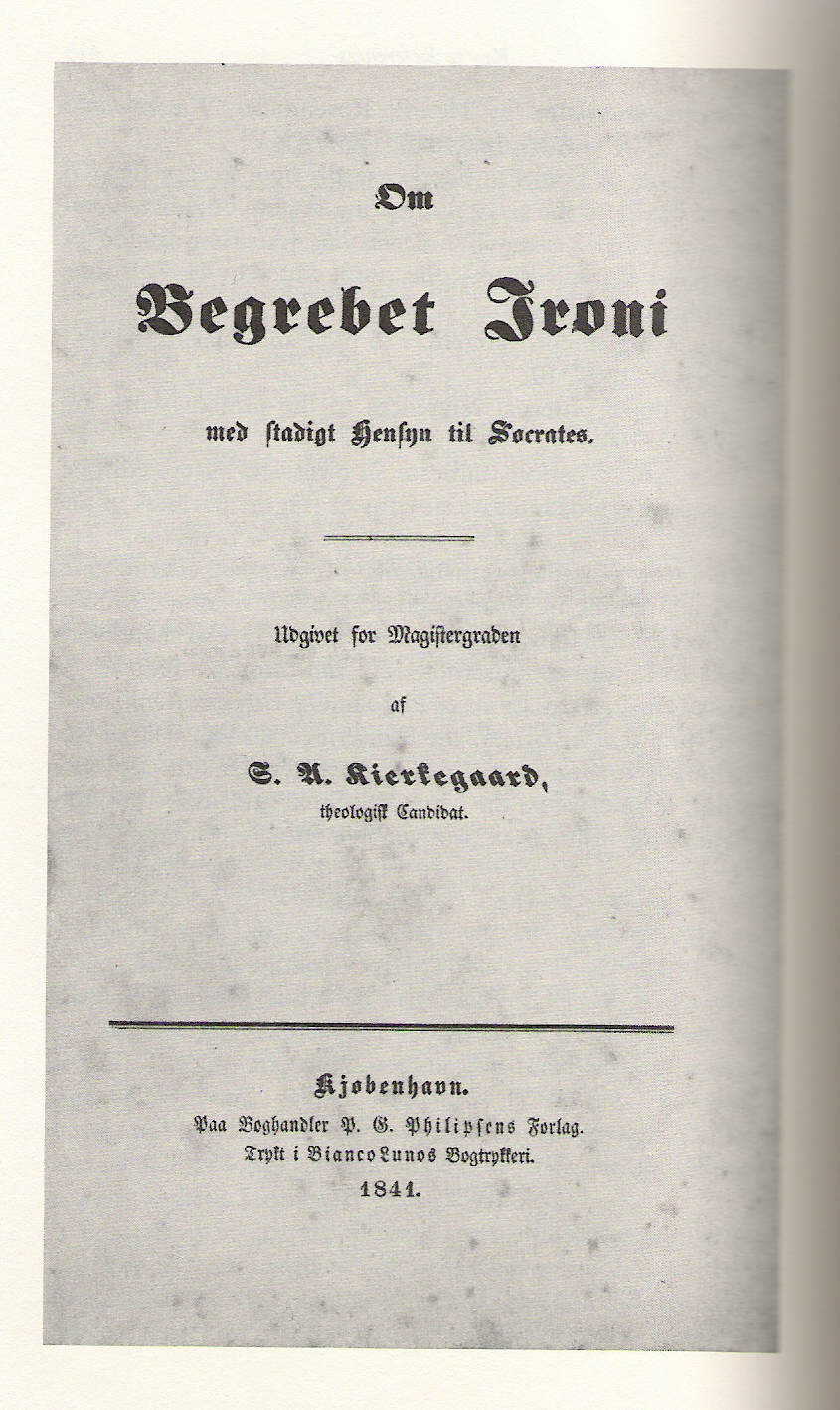
Title page to Søren Kierkegaard's master's thesis

On the Concept of Irony with Continual Reference to Socrates (Danish: Om Begrebet Ironi med stadigt Hensyn til Socrates) is Søren Kierkegaard's 1841 master's thesis under Frederik Christian Sibbern. This thesis is the culmination of three years of extensive study on Socrates, as seen from the view point of Xenophon, Aristophanes, and Plato.

His thesis dealt with irony, and in particular, Socratic irony. In Part One, Kierkegaard regards Aristophanes' portrayal of Socrates, in his play The Clouds, to be the most accurate representation of the man. Whereas Xenophon and Plato portrayed Socrates seriously, Kierkegaard felt that Aristophanes best understood the intricacies of Socratic irony.

In the shorter Part Two of the dissertation, Kierkegaard compares Socratic irony with contemporary interpretations of irony. Here, he offers analysis of major 19th century writers and philosophers including Fichte, Schlegel, and Hegel. One English translation of the book also contains his notes on Schelling's Berlin Lectures of 1841, which Kierkegaard attended shortly after finishing his dissertation.
