= Four Upbuilding Discourses, 1844 =

Book by Søren Kierkegaard

- Author: Søren Kierkegaard
- Original title: Fire opbyggelige Taler
- Translator: David Swenson, Howard V Hong
- Language: Danish
- Series: First authorship (Discourses)
- Genre: Christianity, philosophy
- Published: 1990 Princeton University Press
- Publication date: August 31, 1844
- Publication place: Denmark
- English publication date: 1946 – first translation
- Media type: Hardcover
- Pages: ~110
- ISBN: 0691020876
- Preceded by: The Concept of Anxiety
- Followed by: Three Discourses on Imagined Occasions

Four Upbuilding Discourses (1844) is the last of the Eighteen Upbuilding Discourses published during 1843–1844 by Søren Kierkegaard.

== Overview ==
Similar to Kierkegaard's other books, the Four Upbuilding Discourses discusses decision making. In the book, he has to decide if he wants to get married after having already made the "sacred pledge". He also has to decide if he would carry out the wishes of his father Michael and become a Lutheran preacher.

== Criticism ==
Critics were against putting stress on the inner life of the spiritual self at the expense of the outer life of the physical self. Kierkegaard would agree that a balance is necessary for one to be happy. George Brandes said in his memoirs, "That God had died for me as my Saviour,—I could not understand what it meant."

== Sources ==
=== Primary sources ===
- Man's Need of God Constitutes His Highest Perfection Søren Kierkegaard, Four Upbuilding Discourses, 1844 first discourse of the series. Translated by David F. Swenson 1944–45, 1958
- Four Upbuilding Discourses, 1844 Wikiquote
- Eighteen Upbuilding Discourses, Hong 1990

=== Secondary sources ===
- The Western Literary Messenger, Sept 1849 Living Philosophers in Denmark
- Sixteen Months in the Danish Isles, by Andrew Hamilton (antiquary) 1852
- Evangelical Christendom, ed. (1856). "The Doctrines of Dr Kierkegaard,"
- Hans Lassen Martensen (1871). "Christian ethics : (General part)
- Nietzsche, Frederich, and His Influence, The Book-Lover. Published 1900 p. 144ff
- George Brandes, Reminiscences of My Childhood and Youth, 1906
- Encyclopaedia of religion and ethics Vol 7 (1908) p. 696ff
- Soren Kierkegaard Encyclopædia of Religion and Ethics, Volume VII, James Hastings, John Alexander Selbie, Louis Herbert Gray, published by T. & T. Clark, 1915 p. 696-700
- Paul Tillich, The Courage to Be, 1952 This book also discusses Kierkegaard in relation to becoming.
- Thomas Merton, No Man Is an Island 1955
- Rollo May, The Courage to Create, 1974, 1994 (Google Books)
- Ib Ostenfeld, Alastair McKinnon, Søren Kierkegaard's Psychology 1978 (Google Books)
- Lorraine Clark Blake, Kierkegaard, and the Spectre of the Dialectic, Trent University 1991, Cambridge University Press
