= For Self-Examination =

Book by Søren Kierkegaard

For Self-Examination (subtitle: Recommended to the Present Age; Danish: Til Selvprøvelse Samtiden anbefalet) is a work by Danish philosopher Søren Kierkegaard. It was published on September 20, 1851, as part of Kierkegaard's second authorship. The work has been called one of Kierkegaard's most accessible works, where he writes with "the metaphorical imagination of a poet, the thoughtfulness of a philosopher and theologian, the whimsy of the humourist, and the ardour of the lover and believer."

Preface - My dear reader, read aloud, if possible! If you do so, allow me to thank you for it; if you not only do it yourself, if you also influence others to do it, allow me to thank each one of them, and you again and again! By reading aloud you will gain the strongest impression that you have only yourself to consider, not me, who, after all, am "without authority", nor others, which would be a distraction.

— Søren Kierkegaard, For Self-Examination, in: The Essential Kierkegaard, 2000, p. 393
