= Three Upbuilding Discourses (1843) =

1843 book by Søren Kierkegaard

- Author: Søren Kierkegaard
- Original title: Tre opbyggelige Taler
- Language: Danish
- Series: First authorship (Discourses)
- Genre: Christianity, philosophy
- Publisher: Bookdealer P. G. Philipsen
- Publication date: October 16, 1843
- Publication place: Denmark
- English publication date: 1943 – first translation
- Preceded by: Fear and Trembling
- Followed by: Repetition

Three Upbuilding Discourses is a book by Danish philosopher Søren Kierkegaard that was published in 1843. In this work, Kierkegaard continues his exploration of the distinction between externalities and inwardness, shifting the focus from the inwardness of faith to that of love.

== Structure ==
The Three Discourses are:

- "Love Will Hide a Multitude of Sins"
- "Love Will Hide a Multitude of Sins"
- "Strengthening in the Inner Being"

== "Love Will Hide a Multitude of Sins" ==
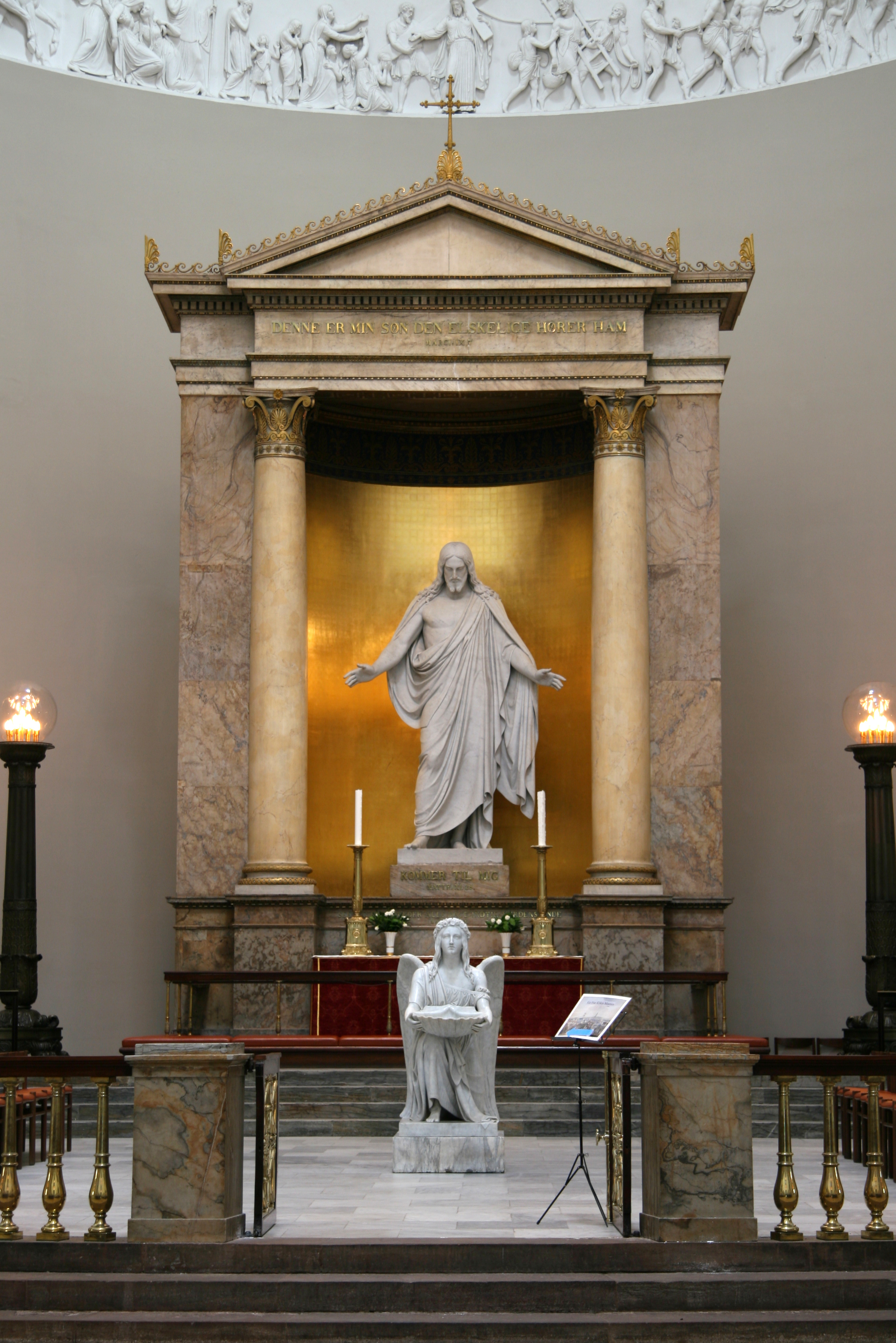
Vor Frue Kirke, Copenhagen, Kierkegaard attended this church before it was burned down and rebuilt. "Father in heaven! Help us never to forget that you are love, so that this full conviction might be victorious in our hearts over the world's allurement, the mind's unrest, the anxieties over the future, the horrors of the past, the needs of the moment. O grant also that this conviction might form our minds so that our hearts become constant and true in love to them whom you bid us to love as ourselves."

Kierkegaard's believes that love never becomes something else because of external circumstances. He discusses “how love hides a multitude of sins”.

== "Love Will Hide a Multitude of Sins" ==
Kierkegaard says love is no dream or mood or the kind of self-love that only thinks of love in relation to itself. Kierkegaard uses the Socratic method to question himself in relation to love and advises everyone to do the same.

Kierkegaard continued his discourse on love in his 1847 book, Works of Love.

== "Strengthening in the Inner Being" ==
Kierkegaard discusses the “main concern of life” in this discourse.

He begins with Paul the Apostle in Rome as a prisoner.

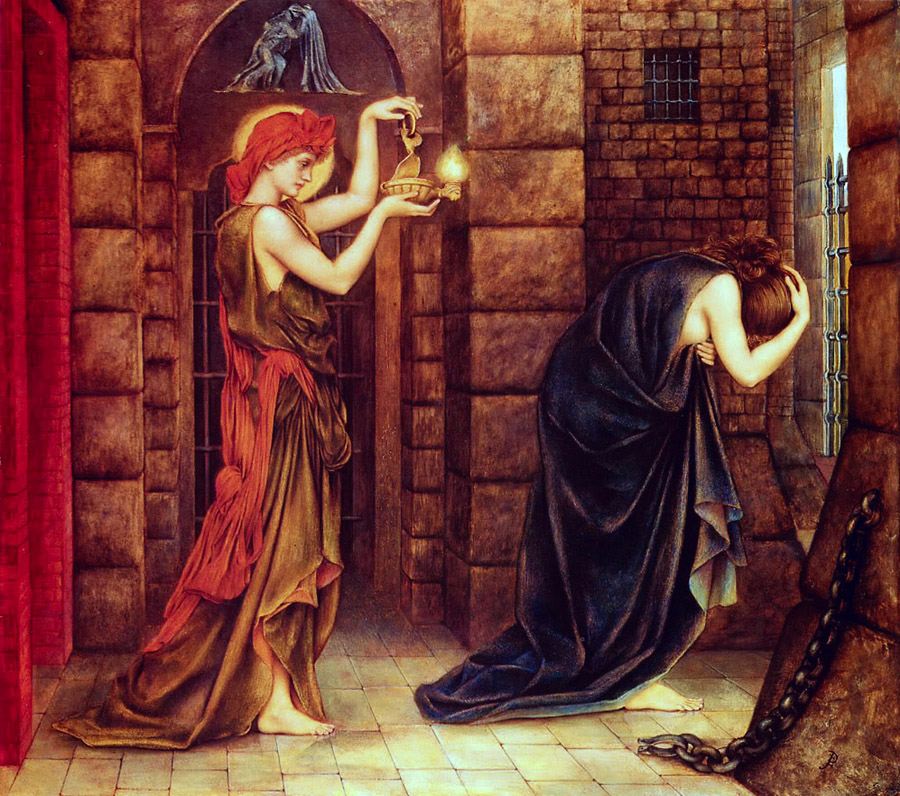
Hope in a Prison of Despair, allegorical, pre-Raphaelite painting by Evelyn De Morgan (30 August 1855-2 May 1919)

Kierkegaard asks three questions:

- Can prosperity serve for strengthening the inner being?
- Can fortune or misfortune serve for strengthening the inner being?
- Can adversity serve for strengthening the inner being?

== Criticism ==
Walter Lowrie related the Discourses to Kierkegaard's other works.

Since the pseudonymous works are in the form of “indirect communication,” they stand in need of interpretation, and the Discourses, which always were in the form of “direct communication,” afford in some instances (especially in the case of Repetition, Fear and Trembling, and the Stages) a very precious and specific illumination of S.K.’s meaning, not merely a proof of his religious intent in general.

== Influence and reception ==
Kierkegaard sold 139 copies of the book. Three Upbuilding Discourses was not translated into English until 1946 when David F. Swenson translated and published all the discourses in four volumes. Howard V. Hong then translated and published them in 1990 into one volume. In 1852 these discourses were called Instructive Tales by William Howitt.

== Sources ==
- Eighteen Upbuilding Discourses, by Søren Kierkegaard], Princeton University Press. Hong, 1990
- Fear and Trembling/Repetition; Copyright 1843 Søren Kierkegaard – Kierkegaard's Writings; 6 – copyright 1983 – Howard V. Hong
- Edifying Discourses, by Søren Kierkegaard, Vol. I, Translated from the Danish by David F. Swenson and Lillian Marvin Swenson, Augsburg Publishing House, Minneapolis, Minnesota, 1943
- Kierkegaard's Writings, III, Part I: Either/Or. Part I. Translated by Howard and Edna Hong. Princeton, 1988, ISBN 978-0-691-02041-9 (Hong)
- Walter Lowrie, A Short Life of Kierkegaard Princeton University Press 1942, 1970 ISBN 0-691-01957-6
