= Two Ages: A Literary Review =

Book by Søren Kierkegaard

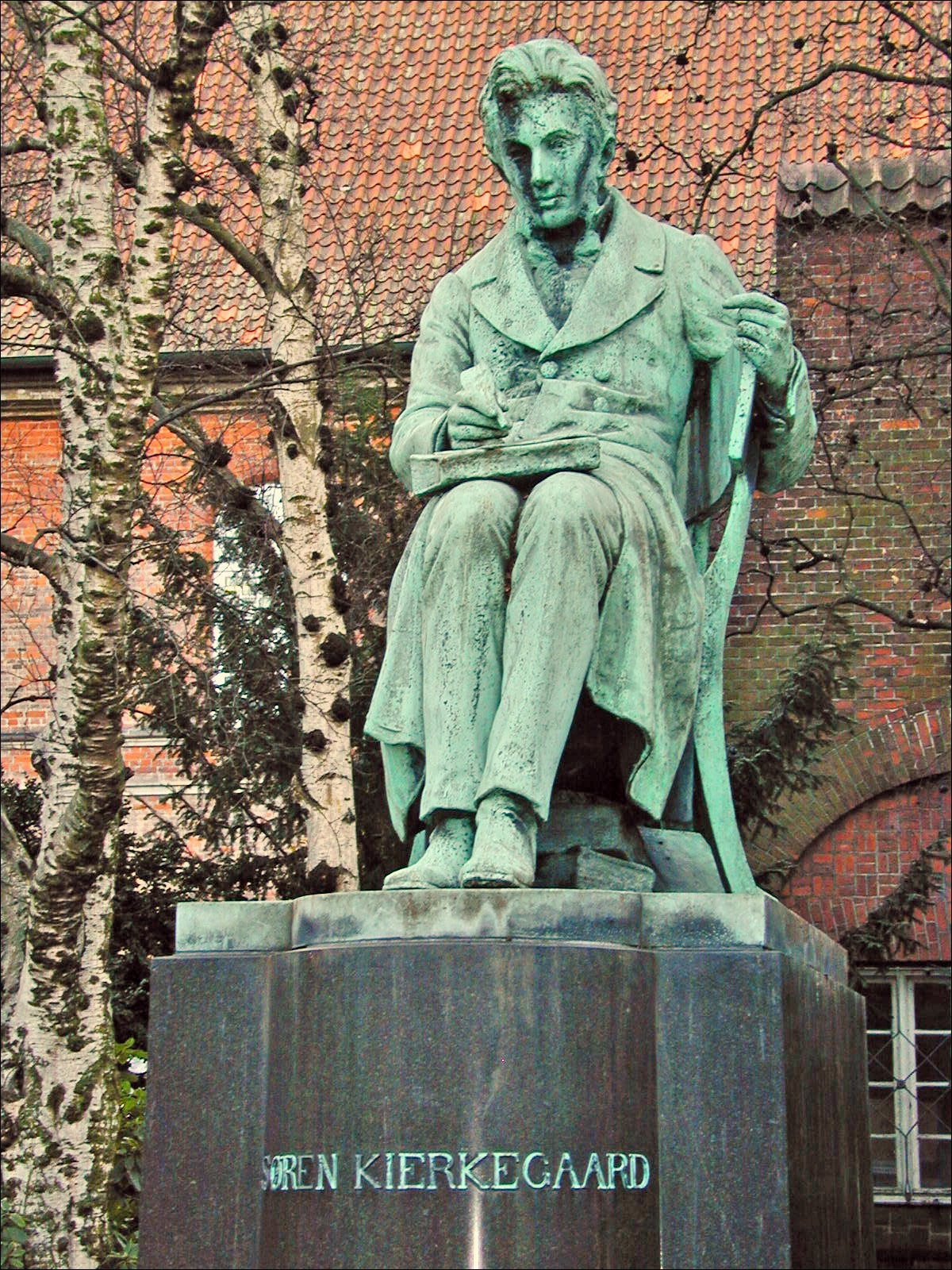
Statue of Søren Kierkegaard in the Royal Library Garden, Denmark

Two Ages: A Literary Review (Danish: En literair Anmeldelse af S. Kierkegaard) is the first book in Søren Kierkegaard's second authorship and was published on March 30, 1846. The work followed The Corsair affair in which he was the target of public ridicule and consequently displays his thought on "the public" and an individual's relationship to it.

== Overview ==
The book was a critique of the novel Two Ages (in some translations Two Generations) written by Thomasine Christine Gyllembourg-Ehrensvärd and discussed "The Age of Revolution" and "The Present Age". Kierkegaard characterized the Age of Revolution as "essentially passionate; therefore it has 'not nullified the principle of contradiction' and can become either good or evil, and whichever way is chosen, the 'impetus' of passion is such that the trace of an action marking its progress or its taking a wrong direction must be perceptible. It is obliged to make a decision, but this again is the saving factor, for decision is the little magic word that existence respects".

After giving his critique of the story, Kierkegaard made several observations on the nature of The Present Age and its passionless attitude towards life. Kierkegaard wrote that "the present age is essentially a sensible age, devoid of passion" and that "[t]he trend today is in the direction of mathematical equality, so that in all classes about so and so many uniformly make one individual". In this, Kierkegaard attacks the conformity and assimilation of individuals into an indifferent and abstract public, "the crowd". Although Kierkegaard attacked the public, he was supportive of communities where individuals keep their diversity and uniqueness. Another element of The Present Age is that it is marked by indecisive deliberation ("reflection") and contemplating ("reflexion") the decay of the age in one's inner thoughts.

Not until the single individual has established an ethical stance despite the whole world, not until then can there be any question of genuinely uniting; otherwise it gets to be a union of people who separately are weak, a union as unbeautiful and depraved as a child-marriage.... When the mouth blathers pure drivel, it is futile to try to deliver a coherent discourse; it is better to consider each word by itself-and so it is with the situation of individuals.

— Søren Kierkegaard, Two Ages: A Literary Review in Essential Kierkegaard, in: The Essential Kierkegaard, 2000, p. 267
