= Works of Love =

1847 book by Søren Kierkegaard

- Author: Søren Kierkegaard
- Original title: Kjerlighedens Gjerninger
- Translator: David Swenson 1946, Howard Hong and Edna Hong 1995, George Pattison 2009
- Language: Danish
- Series: Second authorship (Discourses)
- Genre: Christianity, psychology
- Publisher: C.A. Reitzel
- Publication date: September 29, 1847
- Publication place: Denmark
- English publication date: 1946 – first English translation
- Media type: Paperback
- Pages: 317
- ISBN: 0691037922
- Preceded by: Edifying Discourses in Diverse Spirits
- Followed by: Christian Discourses

Works of Love (Danish: Kjerlighedens Gjerninger) is a book by Søren Kierkegaard, written in 1847. It is one of the works which he published under his own name, as opposed to his more famous "pseudonymous" works. Works of Love deals primarily with the Christian conception of agapic love (Greek: agape), in contrast with erotic love (eros) or preferential love (philia) given to friends and family. Kierkegaard uses this value/virtue to understand the existence and relationship of the individual Christian. Having helped found existentialism, he uses it and a high level of theology, citing the scriptures of the Christian Bible.

Many chapters take a mention of love from the New Testament and center reflections about the transfer of individuals from secular modes (the stages of the aesthetic and ethical) to genuine religious experience and existence. Since human experience is key to understanding Kierkegaard, the actual relationships and experiences of disciples and of Christ are characterized here as tangible models for behavior.

Kierkegaard as a Christian ethicist (represented by this work) is likely to be considered distinct from many ways in which the religion's mainstream seems to function from the viewpoint of an outside observer. This is not only a function of Christian existentialism but also of his time period and political events occurring in his native Denmark.

== Themes ==
- Part One — Topics include: Love's Hidden Life and Its Recognisability by Its Fruits, You Shall Love, You Shall Love Your Neighbor, Love Is the Fulfilling of the Law, Love Is a Matter of Conscience, Our Duty to Love Those We See, and Our Duty to Be in the Debt of Love to Each Other
- Part Two — Topics include: Love Builds Up, Love Believes All Things and Yet Is Never Deceived, Love Hopes All Things and Yet Is Never Put to Shame, Love Seeks Not Its Own, Love Hides the Multiplicity of Sins, Love Abides, Mercifulness, a Work of Love, Even If It Can Give Nothing and Is Capable of Doing Nothing, The Victory of Reconciliation in Love Which Wins the Vanquished, The Work of Love
  in Remembering One Dead and The Work of Love in Praising Love

== Style ==
The Works as Kierkegaard himself states are Christian reflections and not discourses. It is written in a rhetorical style where he often repeats his words and gives numerous examples.
