= Repetition (Kierkegaard book) =

1843 book by Søren Kierkegaard

Repetition: A Venture in Experimental Psychology
- Author: Søren Kierkegaard
- Original title: Gjentagelsen: Et Forsøg i den eksperimenterende Psychologi
- Translator: Walter Lowrie
- Language: Danish
- Series: First authorship (Pseudonymous)
- Genre: Philosophical fiction, Moral philosophy
- Publisher: C.A. Reitzel's, Printed by Biance Luno Press
- Publication date: 16 October 1843
- Publication place: Denmark
- English publication date: 1941
- Pages: ~100
- ISBN: 069107237X
- Preceded by: Three Upbuilding Discourses, 1843
- Followed by: Four Upbuilding Discourses, 1843

Repetition: A Venture in Experimental Psychology (Danish: Gjentagelsen: Et Forsøg i den eksperimenterende Psychologi) is an 1843 book of philosophical fiction by Søren Kierkegaard that is semi-autobiographical. The book was written under the pseudonym Constantin Constantius to reflect its theme of repetition, especially of the thesis that repetition is the basis of most forms of happiness. The book's narrator explores the question of whether true repetition can exist and includes his experiments with this idea and his interactions with an unnamed melancholic character referred to only as the "Young Man".

Kierkegaard published Fear and Trembling, Three Upbuilding Discourses, and Repetition all on the same date, 16 October 1843. While Abraham was the main character in Fear and Trembling, and the Three Upbuilding Discourses were about love, Repetition presents a noticeable contrast between the other two books.

== Content ==
Kierkegaard used the pseudonym Constantin Constantius in this book, reflecting the theme of Repetition. Constantin is currently conducting experiments into whether repetition is possible. The book includes his experiments and his relation to a nameless patient known only as the Young Man. Every patient must have a problem.

The Young Man has fallen in love with a girl, proposed marriage, the proposal has been accepted, but now he has changed his mind. (Note: In other words, "the only happy love", or "actuality and earnestness of existence".) Constantin becomes the young man's confidant. Coincidentally, the problem that the Young Man had is the same problem Kierkegaard had with Regine Olsen. He had proposed to her, she had accepted but he had changed his mind. Kierkegaard was accused of "experimenting with the affections of his fiancée".

== Analysis ==
Charles K. Bellinger says Either/Or, Fear and Trembling and Repetition are works of fiction, "novelistic" in character; they focus on the boundaries between different spheres of existence, such as the aesthetic and the ethical, and the ethical and the religious; they often focus on the subject of marriage; they can be traced back to Kierkegaard's relationship with Regine." There is much in this work that is autobiographical in nature. How much is left up to the reader. (Note: Kierkegaard explained his pseudonymous books in his Unscientific Postscript "Repetition was called “an imaginary psychological construction [experiment]". That this was a doubly reflected communication form soon became clear to me. By taking place in the form of an imaginary construction, the communication creates for itself an opposition, and the imaginary construction establishes a chasmic gap between reader and author and fixes the separation of inwardness between them, so that a direct understanding is made impossible. The imaginary construction is the conscious, teasing revocation of the communication, which is always of importance to an existing person who writes for existing persons, lest the relation be changed to that of a rote reciter who writes for rote reciters." Concluding Unscientific Postscript to Philosophical Fragments Volume I, p. 263-264, 275-283) Kierkegaard explores the conscious choices this Young Man makes.

Kierkegaard said "Seneca has said that when a person has reached his thirtieth year he ought to know his constitution so well that he can be his own physician; I likewise believe that when a person has reached a certain age he ought to be able to be his own pastor. Not as if I would in any way minimize participation in public worship and the guidance given there, but I do think one ought to have one’s view settled with regard to the most important relationships, which, furthermore, one seldom hears preached about in the stricter sense. To devotional books and printed sermons, I have an idiosyncratic aversion, that is why I resort to Scripture when I cannot go to church." In Repetition he followed his own advice and became his own psychologist.

== Structure ==
- Part One: Report by Constantin Constantius
- Part Two: Repetition
- Letters from the Young Man, August 15 - January 13
- Incidental Observations by Constantin Constantius
- Letter From The Young Man, May 31
- Concluding Letter By Constantin Constanius, Copenhagen, August 1843
