= A Short Life of Kierkegaard =

- Book title to A Short Life of Kierkegaard
- Author: Walter Lowrie
- Language: English
- Subject: Philosophy
- Published: 1938 (Oxford University Press, United Kingdom); 1942 (Oxford University Press, United States)
- Publication place: United States
- Media type: Print (Hardback)

A Short Life of Kierkegaard is a book by Walter Lowrie. The book's first edition was published in 1938 by Oxford University Press simply under the title Kierkegaard. The book was influential for being the first English biography which covers both wider and lesser known areas of Søren Kierkegaard's life, philosophy, and theology. Lowrie was commissioned by the editor of Oxford University Press Charles Williams to write the biography and to translate into English for the first time several of Kierkegaard's seminal works in full, including Either/Or and Philosophical Fragments.
