= De omnibus dubitandum est =

Posthumous book by Kierkegaard

De omnibus dubitandum est is a book written by Søren Kierkegaard (about the pseudonym Johannes Climacus), which translates to "everything must be doubted". It was published posthumously. The book portrays the existential consequences of assuming Cartesian doubt, the method of modern philosophy, to its last consequences. The themes portrayed by this book are followed in the subsequent books written by Kierkegaard under the name of Climacus: Philosophical Fragments and its Concluding Unscientific Postscript.

== Web ==
- London Review of Books video review of Johannes Climacus
