= Søren Kierkegaard =

Danish philosopher and theologian (1813–1855)

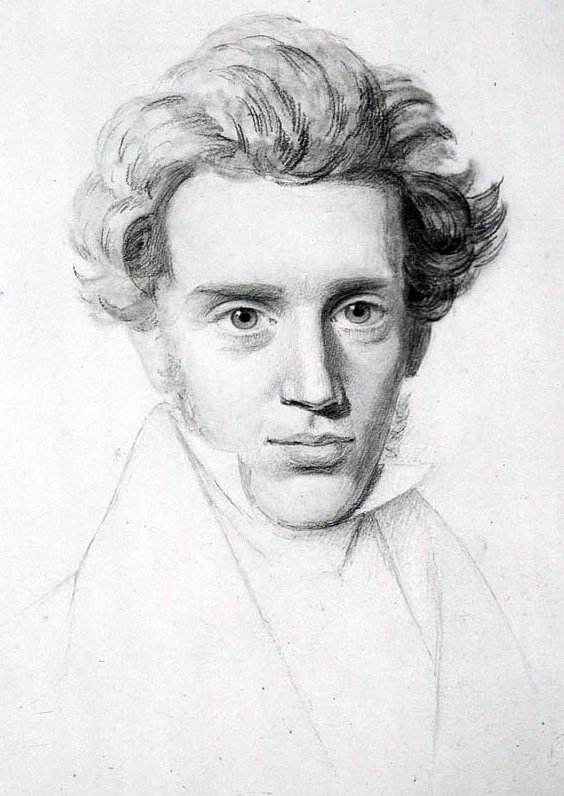
- Unfinished sketch of Kierkegaard by his cousin Niels Christian Kierkegaard, Royal Library, Copenhagen, c. 1840
- Born: Søren Aabye Kierkegaard; 5 May 1813; Copenhagen, Denmark, Denmark–Norway
- Died: 11 November 1855 (aged 42); Copenhagen, Denmark
- Occupations: Philosopher, theologian, poet, social critic, author
- Partner: Regine Olsen (1840–1841)

Education
- Education: University of Copenhagen (1841)
- Thesis: Om Begrebet Ironi med stadigt Hensyn til Socrates (On the Concept of Irony with Continual Reference to Socrates) (1841)
- Academic advisors: Poul Martin Møller; F. W. J. Schelling; Frederik Christian Sibbern

Philosophical work
- Era: 19th-century philosophy
- Region: Western philosophy
- School: Continental philosophy; Christian existentialism
- Main interests: Aesthetics; Epistemology; Ethics; Metaphysics; Philosophy of Christianity; Poetry; Psychology
- Notable ideas: The Absurd; Angst; Authenticity; Existential despair; Existential philosophy; Infinite qualitative distinction; Knight of faith; Leap of faith; Present age

Søren Aabye Kierkegaard (/ˈsɒrən ˈkɪərkəɡɑːrd/ SORR-ən KEER-kə-gard, US also /-ɡɔːr/ -gor; Danish: [ˈsɶːɐn ˈɔˀˌpyˀ ˈkʰiɐ̯kəˌkɒːˀ]; 5 May 1813 – 11 November 1855) was a Danish philosopher, Christian theologian, poet, social critic, and religious author who is widely considered to be the first existentialist philosopher. He wrote critical texts on organized religion, Christianity, morality, ethics, psychology, love, and the philosophy of religion, displaying a fondness for metaphor, irony, and parables. Much of his philosophical work deals with the issues around how one lives as a "single individual", highlighting the importance of authenticity, personal choice and commitment, and the duty to love. Kierkegaard prioritized concrete human reality over abstract thinking.

Kierkegaard's theological work focuses on Socratic Christian ethics, the institution of the Church, the differences among purely objective proofs of Christianity, the infinite qualitative distinction between man and God, and the individual's subjective relationship to the God-Man Jesus Christ, which came through faith. Much of his work deals with Christian love. He was extremely critical of the doctrine and practice of Christianity as a state-controlled religion (Caesaropapism), like the Church of Denmark. His psychological work explored the emotions and feelings of individuals when faced with life choices. Unlike Jean-Paul Sartre and the atheistic existentialism paradigm, Kierkegaard focused on Christian existentialism.

Kierkegaard's early work was written using pseudonyms, who presented distinctive viewpoints and interacted in complex dialogue. He wrote Upbuilding Discourses under his own name and dedicated them to the "single individual" who might want to discover the meaning of his works. He wrote: "Science and scholarship want to teach that becoming objective is the way. Christianity teaches that the way is to become subjective, to become a subject." Kierkegaard emphatically denied that observation alone could reveal the inner workings of the world of the spirit.

Some of Kierkegaard's key ideas include the concept of "subjective and objective truths", the knight of faith, the recollection and repetition dichotomy, angst, the infinite qualitative distinction, faith as a passion, and the three stages on life's way. Kierkegaard wrote in Danish and the reception of his work was initially limited to Scandinavia, but by the turn of the 20th century his writings were translated into French, German, and other major European languages. By the middle of the 20th century, his thought exerted a substantial influence on philosophy, theology, and Western culture in general.

== Early years (1813–1836) ==
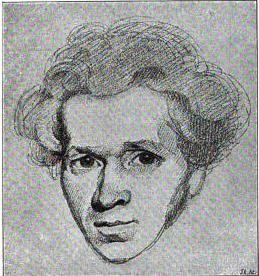
Søren Kierkegaard. ―Hand-drawn copy (1895) of a pencil drawing in the portraiture collection of the Royal Library

Kierkegaard was born to an affluent family in Copenhagen as the youngest of seven children. His mother, Ane Sørensdatter Lund Kierkegaard (1768–1834), had served as a maid in the household before marrying his father, Michael Pedersen Kierkegaard (1756–1838). She was an unassuming figure: quiet, and not formally educated. Her granddaughter, Henriette Lund, wrote that she "wielded her scepter with delight, cosseted them [Søren and his brother Peter], and protected them like a hen her chicks". She also wielded influence on her children so that later Peter Christian Kierkegaard said that his brother preserved many of their mother's words in his writings. His father, on the other hand, was a devoutly Christian well-to-do wool merchant from Jutland. He was a "very stern man, to all appearances dry and prosaic, but under his 'rustic cloak' demeanor he concealed an active imagination which not even his great age could blunt". He was also interested in philosophy and often hosted intellectuals at his home. He was devoted to the rationalist philosophy of Christian Wolff, and he eventually retired partly to pursue more of Wolff's writings. Kierkegaard, who followed his father's beliefs as a child, was heavily influenced by Michael's devotion to Wolffian rationalism. He also enjoyed the comedies of Ludvig Holberg, the writings of Johann Georg Hamann, Gotthold Ephraim Lessing, Edward Young, and Plato. The figure of Socrates, whom Kierkegaard encountered in Plato's dialogues, would prove to be a phenomenal influence on the philosopher's later interest in irony, as well as his frequent deployment of indirect communication.

Kierkegaard loved to walk along the crooked streets of 19th century Copenhagen, where carriages rarely went. In 1848, Kierkegaard wrote, "I had real Christian satisfaction in the thought that, if there were no other, there was definitely one man in Copenhagen whom every poor person could freely accost and converse with on the street; that, if there were no other, there was one man who, whatever the society he most commonly frequented, did not shun contact with the poor, but greeted every maidservant he was acquainted with, every manservant, every common laborer." Our Lady's Church was at one end of the city, where Bishop Mynster preached the Gospel. At the other end was the Royal Theatre where Fru Heiberg performed.

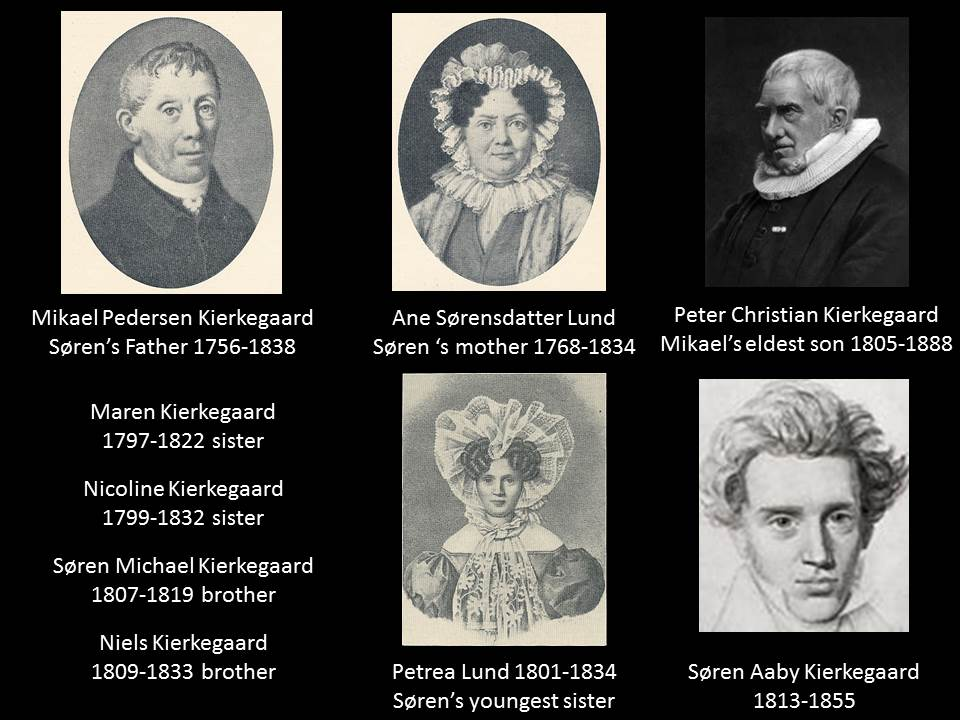
When Michael (Mikael) Kierkegaard died on 9 August 1838, Søren had lost both his parents and all his brothers and sisters except for Peter who later became Bishop of Aalborg in the Danish State Lutheran Church.

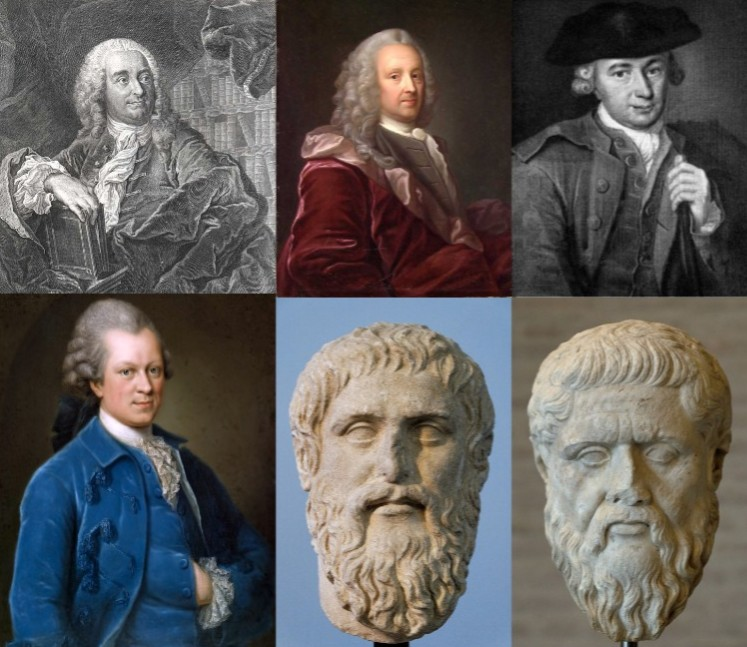
From left to right: Wolff, Holberg, Hamann, Lessing, Plato and Socrates, all of whom became influences in Kierkegaard's philosophy.

Based on a speculative interpretation of anecdotes in Kierkegaard's unpublished journals, especially a rough draft of a story called "The Great Earthquake", some early Kierkegaard scholars argued that Michael believed he had earned God's wrath and that none of his children would outlive him. He is said to have believed that his personal sins, perhaps indiscretions such as cursing the name of God in his youth or impregnating Ane out of wedlock, necessitated this punishment. Though five of his seven children died before he did, both Søren and his brother Peter outlived him. Peter, who was seven years older, later became bishop in Aalborg. Julia Watkin thought Michael's early interest in the Moravian Church could have led him to a deep sense of the devastating effects of sin.

From 1821 to 1830, Kierkegaard attended the School of Civic Virtue, Østre Borgerdyd Gymnasium when the school was situated in Klarebodeme, where Kierkegaard studied Latin, Greek, and history, among other subjects. During his time there he was described as "very conservative"; someone who would "honour the King, love the church and respect the police". He frequently got into altercations with fellow students and was ambivalent towards his teachers. He went on to study theology at the University of Copenhagen. He had little interest in historical works, philosophy dissatisfied him, and he couldn't see "dedicating himself to Speculation". He said, "What I really need to do is to get clear about "what am I to do", not what I must know." He wanted to "lead a completely human life and not merely one of knowledge". Kierkegaard didn't want to be a philosopher in the traditional or Hegelian sense and he didn't want to preach a Christianity that was an illusion. "But he had learned from his father that one can do what one wills, and his father's life had not discredited this theory."

One of the first physical descriptions of Kierkegaard comes from an attendee, Hans Brøchner, at his brother Peter's wedding party in 1836: "I found [his appearance] almost comical. He was then twenty-three years old; he had something quite irregular in his entire form and had a strange coiffure. His hair rose almost six inches above his forehead into a tousled crest that gave him a strange, bewildered look." Another comes from Kierkegaard's niece, Henriette Lund (1829–1909), who recounts that as a little boy Søren was "of a slight and delicate appearance. He went around in a coat the color of red cabbage, and his father usually called him 'the Fork,' because of his precocious tendency to make satirical remarks. Even though there was a serious, almost strict tone in the Kierkegaard home, I still have the impression that there was room for youthful liveliness, though perhaps of a more sober, homemade sort than is usual today. In the same way the house was also open, with an old-fashioned kind of hospitality." He was also described as "quaintly attired, slight and small".

Kierkegaard's mother "was a nice little woman with an even and happy disposition," according to a grandchild's description. She was never mentioned in Kierkegaard's works. Ane died on 31 July 1834, age 66, possibly from typhus. His father died on 8 August 1838, age 82. On 11 August, Kierkegaard wrote: "My father died on Wednesday (the 8th) at 2:00 a.m. I so deeply desired that he might have lived a few years more... Right now I feel there is only one person (E. Boesen) with whom I can really talk about him. He was a 'faithful friend.'"

=== Journals ===
According to Samuel Hugo Bergmann, "Kierkegaard's journals are one of the most important sources for an understanding of his philosophy". Kierkegaard wrote over 7,000 pages in his journals on events, musings, thoughts about his works and everyday remarks. The entire collection of Danish journals (Journalen) was edited and published in 13 volumes consisting of 25 separate bindings including indices. The first English edition of the journals was edited by Alexander Dru in 1938. The style is "literary and poetic [in] manner".

Kierkegaard wanted to have Regine, his fiancée (see below), as his confidant, but considering this an impossibility, made his confidant "my reader, that single individual". His question was whether or not one can have a spiritual confidant. He wrote the following in his Concluding Postscript: "With regard to the essential truth, a direct relation between spirit and spirit is unthinkable. If such a relation is assumed, it actually means that the party has ceased to be spirit."

Kierkegaard's journals were the source of many aphorisms. The following passage, from 1 August 1835, is perhaps his most oft-quoted aphorism and a key quote for existentialist studies:

What I really need is to get clear about what I must do, not what I must know, except insofar as knowledge must precede every act. What matters is to find a purpose, to see what it really is that God wills that I shall do; the crucial thing is to find a truth which is truth for me, to find the idea for which I am willing to live and die.

Although his journals clarify some aspects of his work and life, Kierkegaard took care not to reveal too much. Abrupt changes in thought, repetitive writing, and unusual turns of phrase are some among the many tactics he used to throw readers off track. Consequently, there are many varying interpretations of his journals. Kierkegaard did not doubt the importance his journals would have in the future. In December 1849, he wrote: "Were I to die now the effect of my life would be exceptional; much of what I have simply jotted down carelessly in the Journals would become of great importance and have a great effect; for then people would have grown reconciled to me and would be able to grant me what was, and is, my right."

=== Regine Olsen and graduation (1837–1841) ===
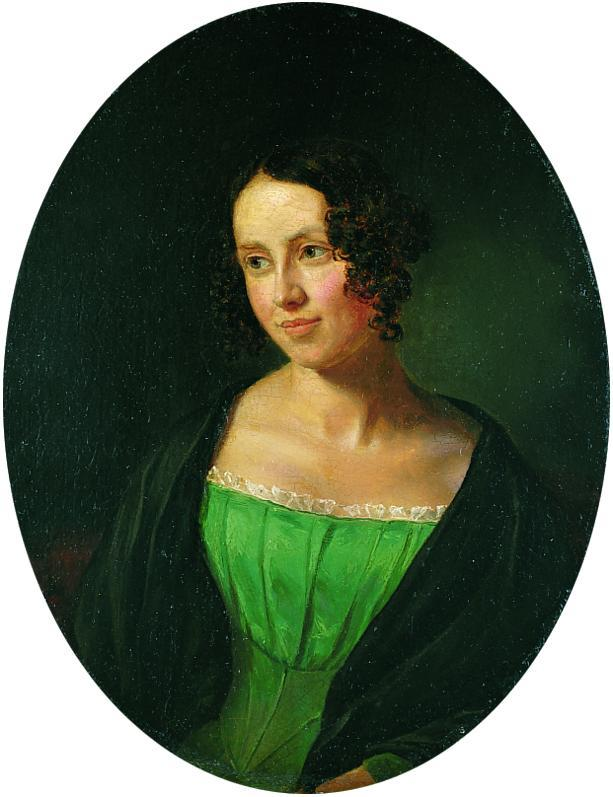
Regine Olsen, a muse for Kierkegaard's writings

An important aspect of Kierkegaard's life—generally considered to have had a major influence on his work—was his broken engagement to Regine Olsen (1822–1904).

Kierkegaard and Olsen met on 8 May 1837 and were instantly attracted to each other. In his journals, Kierkegaard wrote idealistically about his love for her. After passing his theological examinations in July 1840, Kierkegaard formally proposed to Olsen on 8 September. He soon felt disillusioned about his prospects. He broke off the engagement on 11 August 1841, though it is generally believed that the two were deeply in love. Kierkegaard’s first attempt did not end the matter. After he returned the ring with a farewell letter on 11 August 1841, Olsen pleaded with him not to leave her, and by his own account he then tried to repel her so that she would break with him, before he broke the engagement verbally on 11 October 1841. In his journals, Kierkegaard mentions his belief that his "melancholy" made him unsuitable for marriage, but his precise motive for ending the engagement remains unclear.

It was also during this period that Kierkegaard dedicated himself to authoring a dissertation. Upon submitting it in June 1841, a panel of faculty judged that his work demonstrated considerable intellect while criticizing its informal tone; however, Kierkegaard was granted permission to proceed with its defense. He defended On the Concept of Irony with Continual Reference to Socrates over seven and a half hours on 29 September 1841. As the title suggests, the thesis dealt with irony and Socrates; the influence of Kierkegaard's friend Poul Martin Møller, who had died in 1838, is evident in the subject matter. Kierkegaard graduated from the University of Copenhagen on 20 October 1841 with a Magister degree in philosophy. His inheritance of approximately 31,000 rigsdaler enabled him to fund his work and living expenses.

== Authorship (1843–1846) ==
Kierkegaard published some of his works using pseudonyms and some in his own name. Whether being published under pseudonym or not, Kierkegaard's central writing on religion was Fear and Trembling, and Either/Or is considered to be his magnum opus. Pseudonyms were used often in the early 19th century as a means of representing viewpoints other than the author's own. Kierkegaard employed the same technique as a way to provide examples of indirect communication. In writing under various pseudonyms to express sometimes contradictory positions, Kierkegaard is sometimes criticized for playing with various viewpoints without ever committing to one in particular. He has been described by those opposing his writings as indeterminate in his standpoint as a writer, though he himself has testified to all his work deriving from a service to Christianity. He wrote his first book under the pseudonym "Johannes Climacus" (after John Climacus) between 1841 and 1842. De omnibus dubitandum est (Latin for 'Everything must be doubted') was not published until after his death.

Kierkegaard's magnum opus Either/Or was published 20 February 1843. It was mostly written during Kierkegaard's stay in Berlin, where he took notes on Friedrich Wilhelm Joseph Schelling's Philosophy of Revelation. Either/Or includes essays of literary and music criticism and a set of romantic-like aphorisms, as part of his larger theme of examining the reflective and philosophical structure of faith. Edited by "Victor Eremita", the book contained the papers of an unknown "A" and "B" which the pseudonymous author claimed to have discovered in a secret drawer of his secretary. Eremita had a hard time putting the papers of "A" in order because they were not straightforward. "B"'s papers were arranged in an orderly fashion. Both of these characters are trying to become religious individuals. Each approached the idea of first love from an aesthetic and an ethical point of view. The book is basically an argument about faith and marriage with a short discourse at the end telling them they should stop arguing. Eremita thinks "B", a judge, makes the most sense. Kierkegaard stressed the "how" of Christianity as well as the "how" of book reading in his works rather than the "what".

Three months after the publication of Either/Or, he published Two Upbuilding Discourses, 1843 and continued to publish discourses along with his pseudonymous books. These discourses were published under Kierkegaard's own name and are available as Eighteen Upbuilding Discourses today. The word "upbuilding" was more in line with Kierkegaard's thought after 1846, when he wrote Christian deliberations about Works of Love. An upbuilding discourse or edifying discourse isn't the same as a sermon because a sermon is preached to a congregation while a discourse can be carried on between several people or even with oneself. The discourse or conversation should be "upbuilding", which means one would build up the other person, or oneself, rather than tear down to build up. Kierkegaard said: "Although this little book (which is called 'discourses', not sermons, because its author does not have authority to preach, 'upbuilding discourses', not discourses for upbuilding, because the speaker by no means claims to be a teacher) wishes to be only what it is, a superfluity, and desires only to remain in hiding".

On 16 October 1843, Kierkegaard published three more books about love and faith and several more discourses. Fear and Trembling was published under the pseudonym Johannes de Silentio. Repetition is about a Young Man (Søren Kierkegaard) who has anxiety and depression because he feels he has to sacrifice his love for a girl (Regine Olsen) to God. He tries to see if the new science of psychology can help him understand himself. Constantin Constantius, who is the pseudonymous author of that book, is the psychologist. At the same time, he published Three Upbuilding Discourses, 1843 under his own name, which dealt specifically with how love can be used to hide things from yourself or others. These three books, all published on the same day, are an example of Kierkegaard's method of indirect communication.

Kierkegaard questioned whether an individual can know if something is a good gift from God or not and concludes by saying, "it does not depend, then, merely upon what one sees, but what one sees depends upon how one sees; all observation is not just a receiving, a discovering, but also a bringing forth, and insofar as it is that, how the observer himself is constituted is indeed decisive." God's love is imparted indirectly just as our own sometimes is.

During 1844, he published two, three, and four more upbuilding discourses just as he did in 1843, but here he discussed how an individual might come to know God. Theologians, philosophers and historians were all engaged in debating about the existence of God. This is direct communication and Kierkegaard thinks this might be useful for theologians, philosophers, and historians (associations) but not at all useful for the "single individual" who is interested in becoming a Christian. Kierkegaard always wrote for "that single individual whom I with joy and gratitude call my reader"; the single individual must put what is understood to use or it will be lost. Reflection can take an individual only so far before the imagination begins to change the whole content of what was being thought about. Love is won by being exercised just as much as faith and patience are.

He also wrote several more pseudonymous books in 1844: Philosophical Fragments, Prefaces and The Concept of Anxiety and finished the year up with Four Upbuilding Discourses, 1844. He used indirect communication in the first book and direct communication in the rest of them. He doesn't believe the question about God's existence should be an opinion held by one group and differently by another no matter how many demonstrations are made. He says it's up to the single individual to make the fruit of the Holy Spirit real because love and joy are always just possibilities. Christendom wanted to define God's attributes once and for all but Kierkegaard was against this. His love for Regine was a disaster but it helped him because of his point of view.

Kierkegaard believed "each generation has its own task and need not trouble itself unduly by being everything to previous and succeeding generations". In an earlier book he had said, "to a certain degree every generation and every individual begins his life from the beginning", and in another, "no generation has learned to love from another, no generation is able to begin at any other point than the beginning", "no generation learns the essentially human from a previous one." And, finally, in 1850 he wrote, "those true Christians who in every generation live a life contemporaneous with that of Christ have nothing whatsoever to do with Christians of the preceding generation, but all the more with their contemporary, Christ. His life here on earth attends every generation, and every generation severally, as Sacred History..." But in 1848, "The whole generation and every individual in the generation is a participant in one's having faith."

He was against the Hegelian idea of mediation because it introduces a "third term" that comes between the single individual and the object of desire. Kierkegaard wrote in 1844, 'If a person can be assured of the grace of God without needing temporal evidence as a middleman or as the dispensation advantageous to him as interpreter, then it is indeed obvious to him that the grace of God is the most glorious of all." He was against mediation and settled instead on the choice to be content with the grace of God or not. It's the choice between the possibility of the "temporal and the eternal", "mistrust and belief, and deception and truth", "subjective and objective". These are the "magnitudes" of choice. He always stressed deliberation and choice in his writings and wrote against comparison.

=== The Inwardness of Christianity ===
Kierkegaard believed God comes to each individual mysteriously. He published Three Discourses on Imagined Occasions (first called Thoughts on Crucial Situations in Human Life, in David F. Swenson's 1941 translation) under his own name on 29 April, and Stages on Life's Way edited by Hilarius Bookbinder, 30 April 1845. The Stages is a sequel to Either/Or which Kierkegaard did not think had been adequately read by the public and in Stages he predicted "that two-thirds of the book's readers will quit before they are halfway through, out of boredom they will throw the book away." He knew he was writing books but had no idea who was reading them. His sales were meager and he had no publicist or editor. He was writing in the dark, so to speak. Many of his readers have been and continue to be in the dark about his intentions. He explained himself in his "Journal": "What I have understood as the task of the authorship has been done. It is one idea, this continuity from Either/Or to Anti-Climacus, the idea of religiousness in reflection. The task has occupied me totally, for it has occupied me religiously; I have understood the completion of this authorship as my duty, as a responsibility resting upon me." He advised his reader to read his books slowly and also to read them aloud since that might aid in understanding.

He used indirect communication in his writings by, for instance, referring to the religious person as the "knight of hidden inwardness" in which he's different from everyone else, even though he looks like everyone else, because everything is hidden within him.

Kierkegaard imagined hidden inwardness several ways in 1848. He was writing about the subjective inward nature of God's encounter with the individual in many of his books, and his goal was to get the single individual away from all the speculation that was going on about God and Christ. Speculation creates quantities of ways to find God and his Goods but finding faith in Christ and putting the understanding to use stops all speculation, because then one begins to actually exist as a Christian, or in an ethical/religious way. He was against an individual waiting until certain of God's love and salvation before beginning to try to become a Christian. He defined this as a "special type of religious conflict the Germans call Anfechtung" (contesting or disputing).

In Kierkegaard's view, the Church should not try to prove Christianity or even defend it. It should help the single individual to make a leap of faith, the faith that God is love and has a task for that very same single individual. Kierkegaard identified the leap of faith as the good resolution. Kierkegaard discussed the knight of faith in Works of Love, 1847 by using the story of Jesus healing the bleeding woman who showed the " originality of faith" by believing that if she touched Jesus' robe she would be healed. She kept that secret within herself.

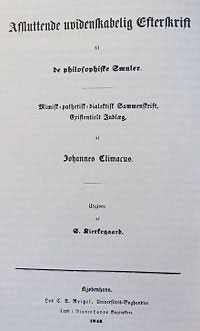
Concluding Unscientific Postscript to Philosophical Fragments

Kierkegaard wrote his Concluding Unscientific Postscript to Philosophical Fragments in 1846 and here he tried to explain the intent of the first part of his authorship. He said, "Christianity will not be content to be an evolution within the total category of human nature; an engagement such as that is too little to offer to a god. Neither does it even want to be the paradox for the believer, and then surreptitiously, little by little, provide him with understanding, because the martyrdom of faith (to crucify one's understanding) is not a martyrdom of the moment, but the martyrdom of continuance." The second part of his authorship was summed up in Practice in Christianity:

Early Kierkegaardian scholars, such as Theodor W. Adorno and Thomas Henry Croxall, argue that the entire authorship should be treated as Kierkegaard's own personal and religious views. This view leads to confusions and contradictions which make Kierkegaard appear philosophically incoherent. Later scholars, such as the post-structuralists, interpreted Kierkegaard's work by attributing the pseudonymous texts to their respective authors. Postmodern Christians present a different interpretation of Kierkegaard's works. Kierkegaard used the category of "The Individual" to stop the endless Either/Or.

=== Pseudonyms ===
Kierkegaard's most important pseudonyms, in chronological order, were:

- Victor Eremita, editor of Either/Or
- A, writer of many articles in Either/Or
- Judge Vilhelm, author of rebuttals to A in Either/Or
- Johannes de Silentio, author of Fear and Trembling
- Constantin Constantius, author of the first half of Repetition
- Young Man, author of the second half of Repetition
- Vigilius Haufniensis, author of The Concept of Anxiety
- Nicolaus Notabene, author of Prefaces
- Hilarius Bookbinder, editor of Stages on Life's Way
- Johannes Climacus, author of Philosophical Fragments and Concluding Unscientific Postscript to Philosophical Fragments
- Inter et Inter, author of The Crisis and a Crisis in the Life of an Actress
- H.H., author of Two Minor Ethical-Religious Essays
- Anti-Climacus, author of The Sickness unto Death and Practice in Christianity

All of these writings analyze the concept of faith, on the supposition that if people are confused about faith, as Kierkegaard thought the inhabitants of Christendom were, they will not be in a position to develop the virtue. Faith is a matter of reflection in the sense that one cannot have the virtue unless one has the concept of virtue—or at any rate the concepts that govern faith's understanding of self, world, and God.

=== The Corsair affair ===
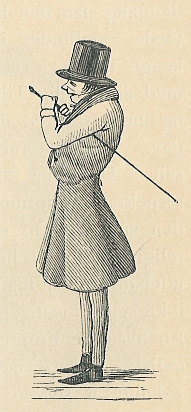
A caricature of Kierkegaard published in The Corsair, a satirical journal

On 22 December 1845, Peder Ludvig Møller, who studied at the University of Copenhagen at the same time as Kierkegaard, published an article indirectly criticizing Stages on Life's Way. The article complimented Kierkegaard for his wit and intellect, but questioned whether he would ever be able to master his talent and write coherent, complete works. Møller was also a contributor to and editor of The Corsair, a Danish satirical paper that lampooned everyone of notable standing. Kierkegaard published a sarcastic response, charging that Møller's article was merely an attempt to impress Copenhagen's literary elite.

Kierkegaard wrote two small pieces in response to Møller, The Activity of a Traveling Esthetician and Dialectical Result of a Literary Police Action. The former focused on insulting Møller's integrity while the latter was a directed assault on The Corsair, in which Kierkegaard, after criticizing the journalistic quality and reputation of the paper, openly asked The Corsair to satirize him.

Kierkegaard's response earned him the ire of the paper and its second editor, also an intellectual of Kierkegaard's own age, Meïr Aron Goldschmidt. Over the next few months, The Corsair took Kierkegaard up on his offer to "be abused", and unleashed a series of attacks making fun of Kierkegaard's appearance, voice and habits. For months, Kierkegaard perceived himself to be the victim of harassment on the streets of Denmark. In a journal entry dated 9 March 1846, Kierkegaard made a long, detailed explanation of his attack on Møller and The Corsair, and also explained that this attack made him rethink his strategy of indirect communication.

There had been much discussion in Denmark about the pseudonymous authors until the publication of Concluding Unscientific Postscript to Philosophical Fragments, 27 February 1846, where he openly admitted to be the author of the books because people began wondering if he was, in fact, a Christian or not. Several Journal entries from that year shed some light on what Kierkegaard hoped to achieve. This book was published under an earlier pseudonym, Johannes Climacus. On 30 March 1846 he published Two Ages: A Literary Review, under his own name. A critique of the novel Two Ages (in some translations Two Generations) written by Thomasine Christine Gyllembourg-Ehrensvärd, Kierkegaard made several insightful observations on what he considered the nature of modernity and its passionless attitude towards life. Kierkegaard writes that "the present age is essentially a sensible age, devoid of passion... The trend today is in the direction of mathematical equality, so that in all classes about so and so many uniformly make one individual". In this, Kierkegaard attacked the conformity and assimilation of individuals into "the crowd" which became the standard for truth, since it was the numerical. How can one love the neighbor if the neighbor is always regarded as the wealthy or the poor or the lame?

As part of his analysis of the "crowd", Kierkegaard accused newspapers of decay and decadence. Kierkegaard stated Christendom had "lost its way" by recognizing "the crowd", as the many who are moved by newspaper stories, as the court of last resort in relation to "the truth". Truth comes to a single individual, not all people at one and the same time. Just as truth comes to one individual at a time so does love. One doesn't love the crowd but does love their neighbor, who is a single individual. He says, "never have I read in the Holy Scriptures this command: You shall love the crowd; even less: You shall, ethico-religiously, recognize in the crowd the court of last resort in relation to 'the truth.'"

== Authorship (1847–1855) ==
Kierkegaard began to publish under his own name again in 1847: the three-part Edifying Discourses in Diverse Spirits. It included Purity of Heart is to Will One Thing, What we Learn from the Lilies in the Field and from the Birds in the Air, and The Gospel of Sufferings. He asked, What does it mean to be a single individual who wants to do the good? What does it mean to be a human being? What does it mean to follow Christ? He now moves from "upbuilding (Edifying) discourses" to "Christian discourses", however, he still maintains that these are not "sermons". A sermon is about struggle with oneself about the tasks life offers one and about repentance for not completing the tasks. Later, in 1849, he wrote devotional discourses and Godly discourses.

Works of Love followed these discourses on 29 September 1847. Both books were authored under his own name. It was written under the themes "Love covers a multitude of sins" and "Love builds up". (1 Peter 4:8 and 1 Corinthians 8:1) Kierkegaard believed that "all human speech, even divine speech of Holy Scripture, about the spiritual is essentially metaphorical speech". "To build up" is a metaphorical expression. One can never be all human or all spirit, one must be both. Later, in the same book, Kierkegaard deals with the question of sin and forgiveness. He uses the same text he used earlier in Three Upbuilding Discourses, 1843, Love hides a multitude of sins. (1 Peter 4:8). He asks if "one who tells his neighbors faults hides or increases the multitude of sins".

In 1848, he published Christian Discourses under his own name and The Crisis and a Crisis in the Life of an Actress under the pseudonym Inter et Inter. Christian Discourses deals the same theme as The Concept of Anxiety, angst. The text is the Gospel of Matthew 6 verses 24–34. This was the same passage he had used in his What We Learn From the Lilies in the Field and From the Birds of the Air of 1847.

Kierkegaard tried to explain his prolific use of pseudonyms again in The Point of View of My Work as an Author, his autobiographical explanation for his writing style. The book was finished in 1848, but not published until after his death by his brother Peter Christian Kierkegaard. Walter Lowrie mentioned Kierkegaard's "profound religious experience of Holy Week 1848" as a turning point from "indirect communication" to "direct communication" regarding Christianity. However, Kierkegaard stated that he was a religious author throughout all of his writings and that his aim was to discuss "the problem 'of becoming a Christian', with a direct polemic against the monstrous illusion we call Christendom". He expressed the illusion this way in his 1848 "Christian Address", Thoughts Which Wound From Behind – for Edification.

He wrote three discourses under his own name and one pseudonymous book in 1849. He wrote The Lily of the Field and the Bird of the Air. Three Devotional Discourses, Three Discourses at the Communion on Fridays and Two Ethical–Religious Essays. The first thing any child finds in life is the external world of nature. This is where God placed his natural teachers. He's been writing about confession and now openly writes about Holy Communion which is generally preceded by confession. This he began with the confessions of the esthete and the ethicist in Either/Or and the highest good peace in the discourse of that same book. His goal has always been to help people become religious but specifically Christian religious. He summed his position up earlier in his book, The Point of View of My Work as an Author, but this book was not published until 1859.

The second edition of Either/Or was published early in 1849. Later that year he published The Sickness unto Death, under the pseudonym Anti-Climacus. He's against Johannes Climacus, who kept writing books about trying to understand Christianity. Here he says, "Let others admire and praise the person who pretends to comprehend Christianity. I regard it as a plain ethical task—perhaps requiring not a little self-denial in these speculative times, when all 'the others' are busy with comprehending—to admit that one is neither able nor supposed to comprehend it." Sickness unto death was a familiar phrase in Kierkegaard's earlier writings. This sickness is despair and for Kierkegaard despair is a sin. Despair is the impossibility of possibility.

In Practice in Christianity, 25 September 1850, his last pseudonymous work, he stated, "In this book, originating in the year 1848, the requirement for being a Christian is forced up by the pseudonymous author to a supreme ideality." This work was called Training in Christianity when Walter Lowrie translated it in 1941.

He now pointedly referred to the acting single individual in his next three publications; For Self-Examination, Two Discourses at the Communion on Fridays, and in 1852 Judge for Yourselves!. Judge for Yourselves! was published posthumously in 1876.

In 1851 Kierkegaard wrote his Two Discourses at the Communion on Fridays where he once more discussed sin, forgiveness, and authority using that same verse from 1 Peter 4:8 that he used twice in 1843 with his Three Upbuilding Discourses, 1843.

Kierkegaard began his 1843 book Either/Or with a question: "Are passions, then, the pagans of the soul? Reason alone baptized?" He didn't want to devote himself to Thought or Speculation like Hegel did. Faith, hope, love, peace, patience, joy, self-control, vanity, kindness, humility, courage, cowardliness, pride, deceit, and selfishness. These are the inner passions that Thought knows little about. Hegel begins the process of education with Thought but Kierkegaard thinks we could begin with passion, or a balance between the two, a balance between Goethe and Hegel. He was against endless reflection with no passion involved. But at the same time he did not want to draw more attention to the external display of passion but the internal (hidden) passion of the single individual. Kierkegaard clarified this intention in his Journals.

Schelling put Nature first and Hegel put Reason first but Kierkegaard put the human being first and the choice first in his writings. He makes an argument against Nature here and points out that most single individuals begin life as spectators of the visible world and work toward knowledge of the invisible world.

Nikolai Berdyaev makes a related argument against reason in his 1945 book The Divine and the Human.

=== Attack upon the Lutheran State Church ===
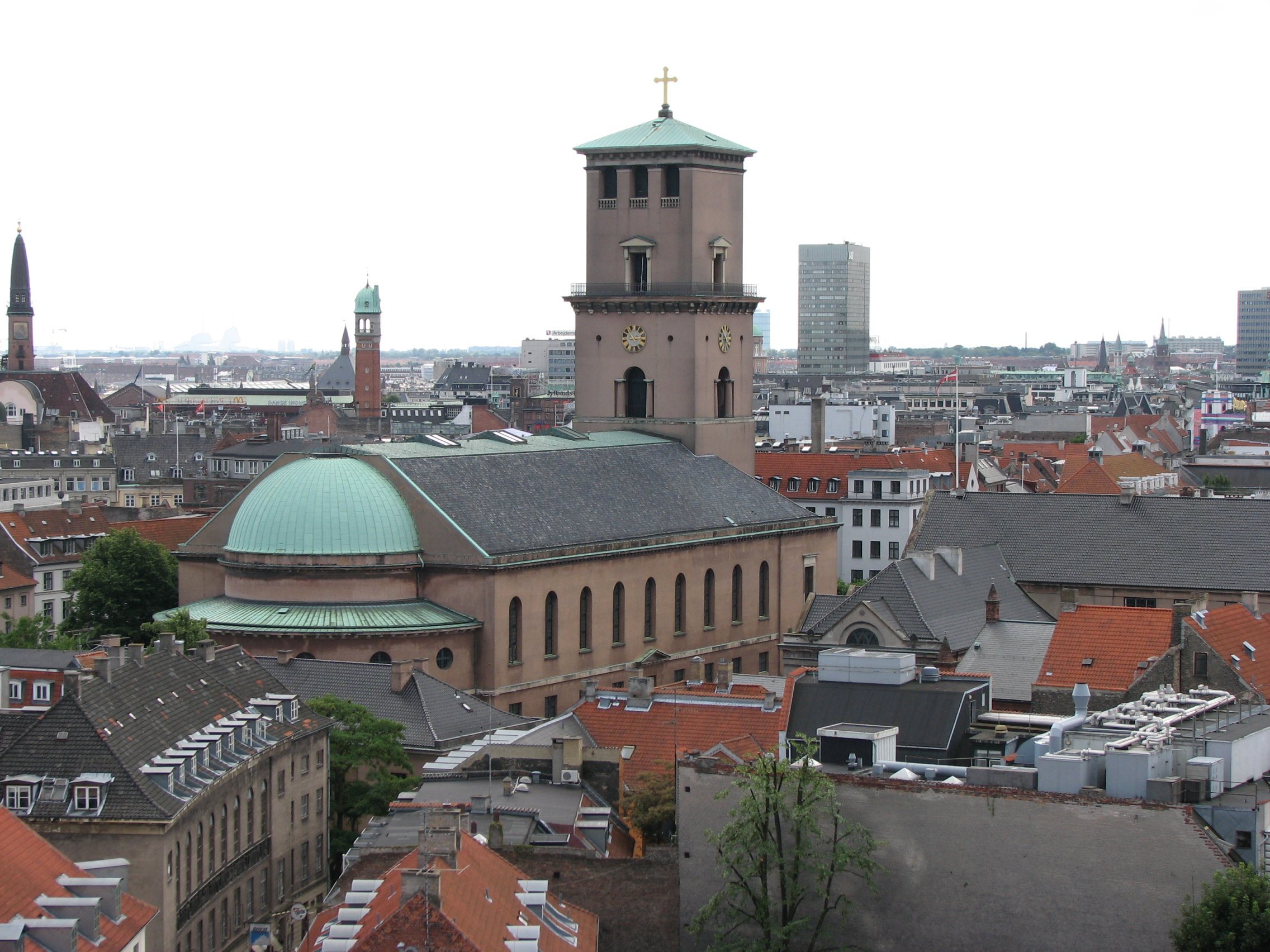
"Vor Frue Kirke", the Lutheran cathedral in Copenhagen (completed 1829)

Kierkegaard's final years were taken up with a sustained, outright attack on the Church of Denmark by means of newspaper articles published in The Fatherland (Fædrelandet) and a series of self-published pamphlets called The Moment (Øjeblikket), also translated as The Instant. These pamphlets are now included in Kierkegaard's Attack Upon Christendom. The Moment was translated into German and other European languages in 1861 and again in 1896.

Kierkegaard first moved to action after Professor (soon Bishop) Hans Lassen Martensen gave a speech in church in which he called the recently deceased Bishop Jacob Peter Mynster a "truth-witness, one of the authentic truth-witnesses". Kierkegaard explained, in his first article, that Mynster's death permitted him—at last—to be frank about his opinions. He later wrote that all his former output had been "preparations" for this attack, postponed for years waiting for two preconditions: 1) both his father and bishop Mynster should be dead before the attack, and 2) he should himself have acquired a name as a famous theologic writer. Kierkegaard's father had been Mynster's close friend, but Søren had long come to see that Mynster's conception of Christianity was mistaken, demanding too little of its adherents. Kierkegaard strongly objected to the portrayal of Mynster as a 'truth-witness'.

Kierkegaard described the hope the witness to the truth has in 1847 and in his Journals.

Kierkegaard's pamphlets and polemical books, including The Moment, criticized several aspects of church formalities and politics. According to Kierkegaard, the idea of congregations keeps individuals as children since Christians are disinclined from taking the initiative to take responsibility for their own relation to God. He stressed that "Christianity is the individual, here, the single individual". Furthermore, since the Church was controlled by the State, Kierkegaard believed the State's bureaucratic mission was to increase membership and oversee the welfare of its members. More members would mean more power for the clergymen: a corrupt ideal. This mission would seem at odds with Christianity's true doctrine, which, to Kierkegaard, is to stress the importance of the individual, not the whole. Thus, the state-church political structure is offensive and detrimental to individuals, since anyone can become "Christian" without knowing what it means to be Christian. It is also detrimental to the religion itself since it reduces Christianity to a mere fashionable tradition adhered to by unbelieving "believers", a "herd mentality" of the population, so to speak. Kierkegaard always stressed the importance of the conscience and the use of it.

He showed marked elements of convergence with medieval Catholicism. Nonetheless, Kierkegaard has been described as "profoundly Lutheran" by later (non-contemporaneous) scholars.

== Death ==
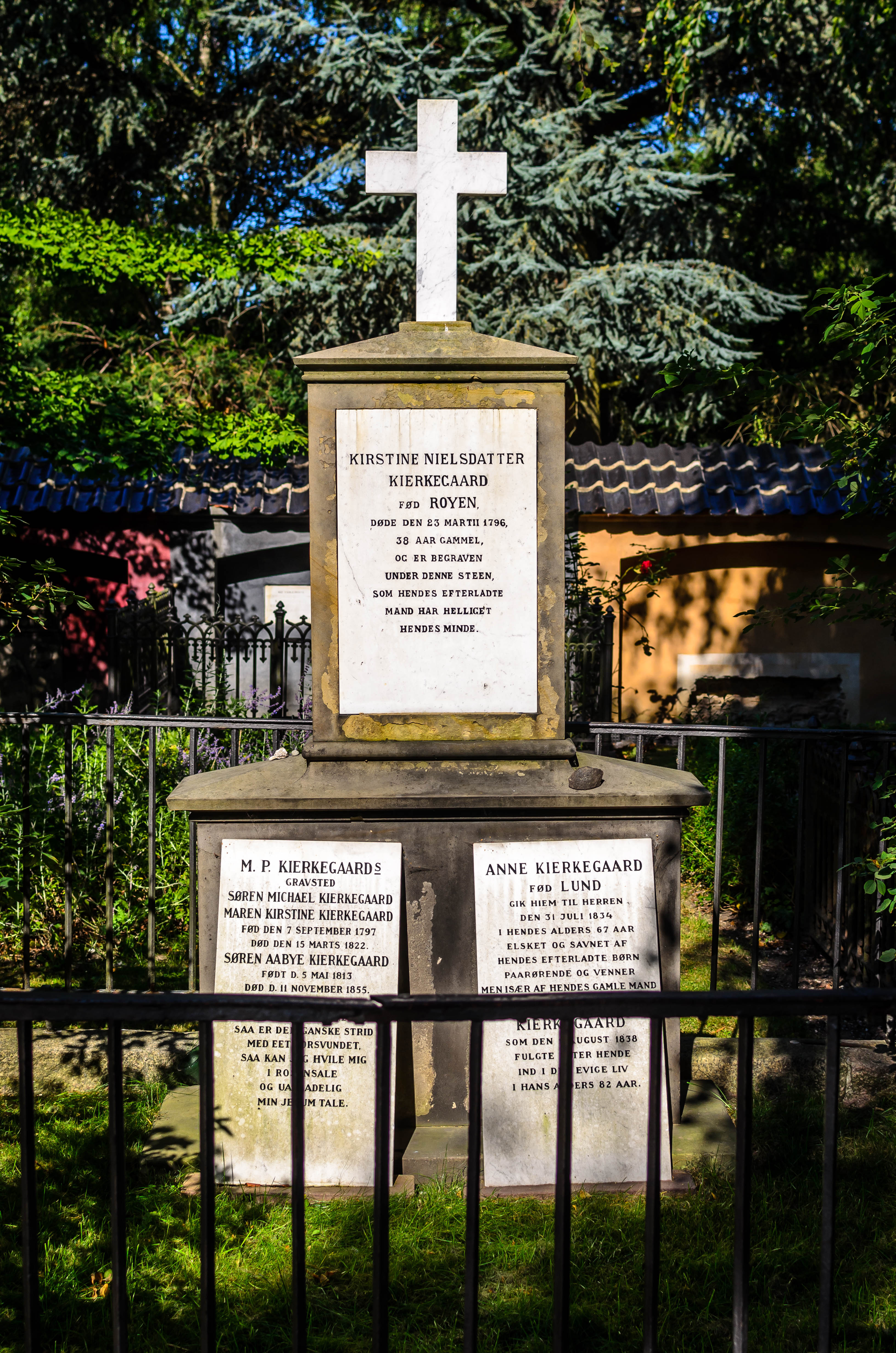
Søren Kierkegaard's grave in Assistens Kirkegård

Prior to the publication of The Moment, Kierkegaard collapsed on the street. He stayed in the hospital for over a month and refused communion. At that time he regarded pastors as mere political officials, a niche in society who were clearly not representative of the divine. He told Emil Boesen, a friend since childhood, who kept a record of his conversations with Kierkegaard, that his life had been one of immense suffering, which may have seemed like vanity to others, but he did not think it so.

Kierkegaard died in Frederiks Hospital after over a month, possibly from complications from a fall from a tree in his youth. It has been suggested by professor Kaare Weismann and philosopher Jens Staubrand that Kierkegaard died from Pott disease, a form of tuberculosis. He was interred in the Assistens Kirkegård in the Nørrebro section of Copenhagen. At Kierkegaard's funeral, his nephew Henrik Lund caused a disturbance by protesting Kierkegaard's burial by the official church. Lund maintained that Kierkegaard would never have approved, had he been alive, as he had broken from and denounced the institution. Lund was later fined for his disruption of the funeral.

== Reception ==
=== 19th-century reception ===
Fredrika Bremer wrote of Kierkegaard in 1850: "While Martensen with his wealth of genius casts from his central position light upon every sphere of existence, upon all the phenomena of life, Søren Kierkegaard stands like another Simon Stylites, upon his solitary column, with his eye unchangeably fixed upon one point." In 1855, the Danish National Church published his obituary. Kierkegaard did have an impact there judging from the following quote from their article: "The fatal fruits which Dr. Kierkegaard show to arise from the union of Church and State, have strengthened the scruples of many of the believing laity, who now feel that they can remain no longer in the Church, because thereby they are in communion with unbelievers, for there is no ecclesiastical discipline."

Changes did occur in the administration of the Church and these changes were linked to Kierkegaard's writings. The Church noted that dissent was "something foreign to the national mind". On 5 April 1855, the Church enacted new policies: "every member of a congregation is free to attend the ministry of any clergyman, and is not, as formerly, bound to the one whose parishioner he is". In March 1857, compulsory infant baptism was abolished. Debates sprang up over the King's position as the head of the Church and over whether to adopt a constitution. Grundtvig objected to having any written rules. Immediately following this announcement the "agitation occasioned by Kierkegaard" was mentioned. Kierkegaard was accused of Weigelianism and Darbyism, but the article continued to say, "One great truth has been made prominent, viz (namely): That there exists a worldly-minded clergy; that many things in the Church are rotten; that all need daily repentance; that one must never be contented with the existing state of either the Church or her pastors."

Hans Lassen Martensen addressed Kierkegaard's ideas extensively in Christian Ethics, published in 1871. Martensen accused Kierkegaard and Alexandre Vinet of not giving society its due, saying both of them put the individual above society, and in so doing, above the Church. Another early critic was Magnús Eiríksson, who criticized Martensen and wanted Kierkegaard as his ally in his fight against speculative theology.

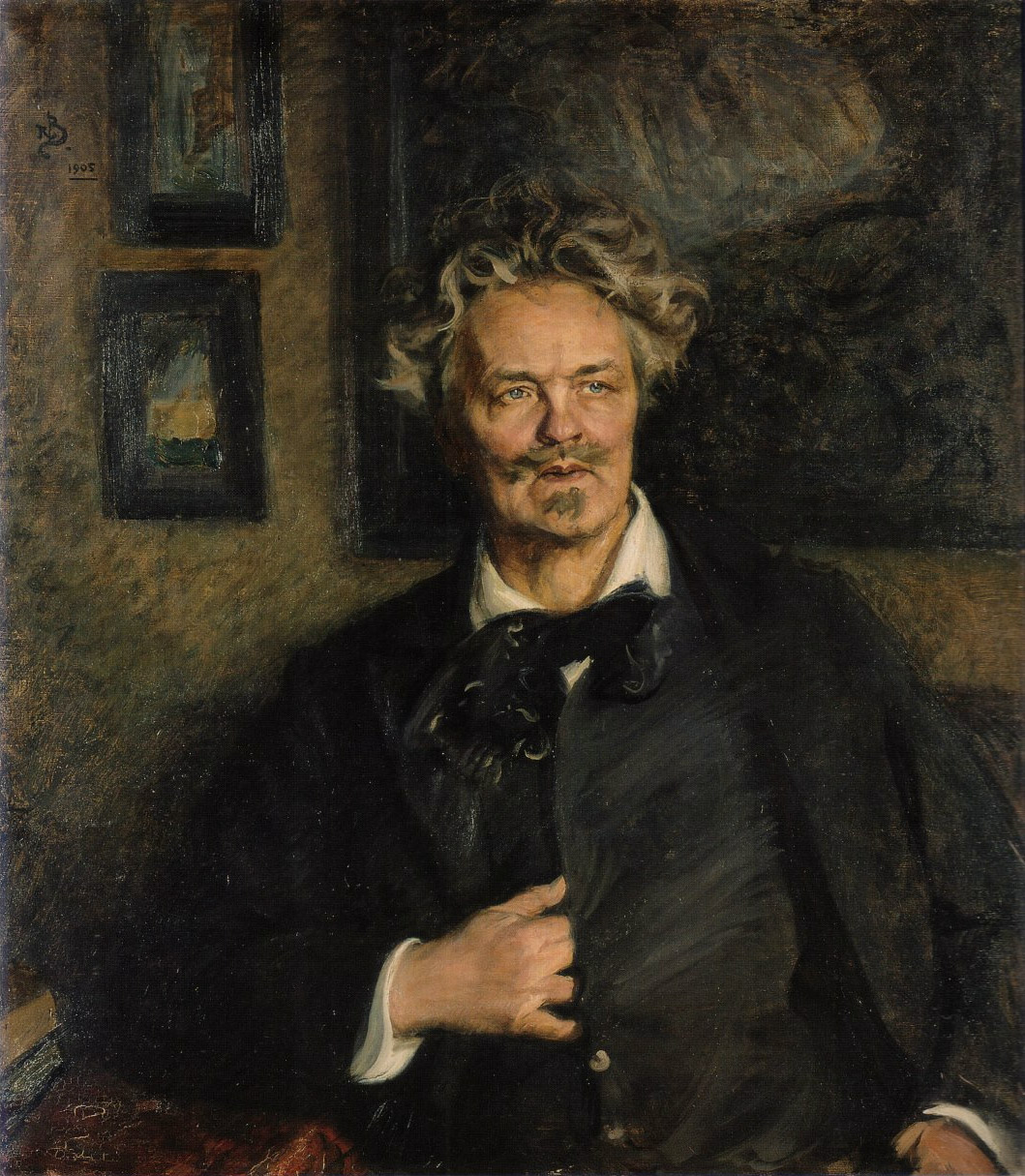
August Strindberg (1849–1912) from Sweden

August Strindberg was deeply affected by reading Kierkegaard while a student at Uppsala University. Edwin Björkman credited Kierkegaard, as well as Henry Thomas Buckle and Eduard von Hartmann, with shaping Strindberg's artistic form "until he was strong enough to stand wholly on his own feet." The dramatist Henrik Ibsen is said to have been interested in Kierkegaard, as well as the Norwegian national writer and poet Bjørnstjerne Bjørnson.

Otto Pfleiderer, in The Philosophy of Religion On the Basis of Its History (1887), claimed that Kierkegaard presented an anti-rational view of Christianity. An entry on Kierkegaard from an 1889 dictionary of religion presents an idea of how he was regarded at that time, stating: "He was the most original thinker and theological philosopher the North ever produced. His fame has been steadily growing since his death, and he bids fair to become the leading religio-philosophical light of Germany. Not only his theological but also his aesthetic works have of late become the subject of universal study in Europe."

Although not cited by him explicitly, Kierkegaard's view of faith would influence Norwegian theologian Gisle Christian Johnson (1822–1894). Johnson's system of dogmatic theology contained in his Grundrids af den Systematisk Theologi (published posthumously in 1897) differed starkly from those of his contemporaries in its integration of a threefold paradigm for viewing the essence of faith (Troens Væsen) as Egotistic, Legalist, and Christian, found in the first part of the work ("Pistiks"), which itself was cast in the Law/Gospel mold of confessional Lutheranism. The final stage is marked in terms of discontinuity and radical change, and thus requires a leap to faith similar to that of Kierkegaard, what Johnson styles an irrefutable claim (uafviselig Fordring) of higher existence correlate to True Being (sande Væsen). Likewise, the development of the infinite qualitative distinction from subjective faith by Gisle Johnson has distinct Kierkegaardian overtones. Johnson would have read Kierkegaard in the 1840s during his studies in continental Europe, developing his Pistiks in 1853 after his appointment to faculty at the University of Kristiana; as such, Svein Aage Christoffersen has designated Johnson to be the first Kierkegaardian in theology, fusing confessional, theological, and experiential categories of faith into a single dogmatic system. Johnson's pietistic emphases merged with Kierkegaard's own emphases on genuineness of faith to produce a revivalist movement that swept across Norway, known as the Johnsonian Revivals.

=== Early 20th-century reception ===
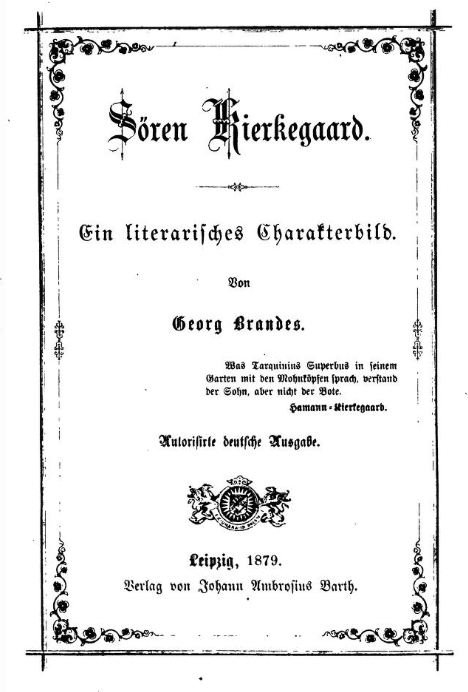
1879 German edition of Brandes' biography about Søren Kierkegaard

The first academic to draw attention to Kierkegaard was fellow Dane Georg Brandes, who published in German as well as Danish. Brandes gave the first formal lectures on Kierkegaard in Copenhagen and helped bring him to the attention of the European intellectual community. Brandes published the first book on Kierkegaard's philosophy and life, Søren Kierkegaard, ein literarisches Charakterbild (1879) which Adolf Hult said was a "misconstruction" of Kierkegaard's work and "falls far short of the truth". Brandes compared him to Hegel and Tycho Brahe in Reminiscences of my Childhood and Youth (1906). Brandes also discussed the Corsair Affair in the same book. Brandes opposed Kierkegaard's ideas in the 1911 edition of the Britannica. Brandes compared Kierkegaard to Friedrich Nietzsche as well. He also mentioned Kierkegaard extensively in volume 2 of his 6 volume work, Main Currents in Nineteenth Century Literature (1872 in German and Danish, 1906 English).

Swedish author Waldemar Rudin published Sören Kierkegaards person och författarskap – ett försök in 1880. During the 1890s, Japanese philosophers began disseminating the works of Kierkegaard. Tetsuro Watsuji was one of the first philosophers outside of Scandinavia to write an introduction on his philosophy, in 1915.

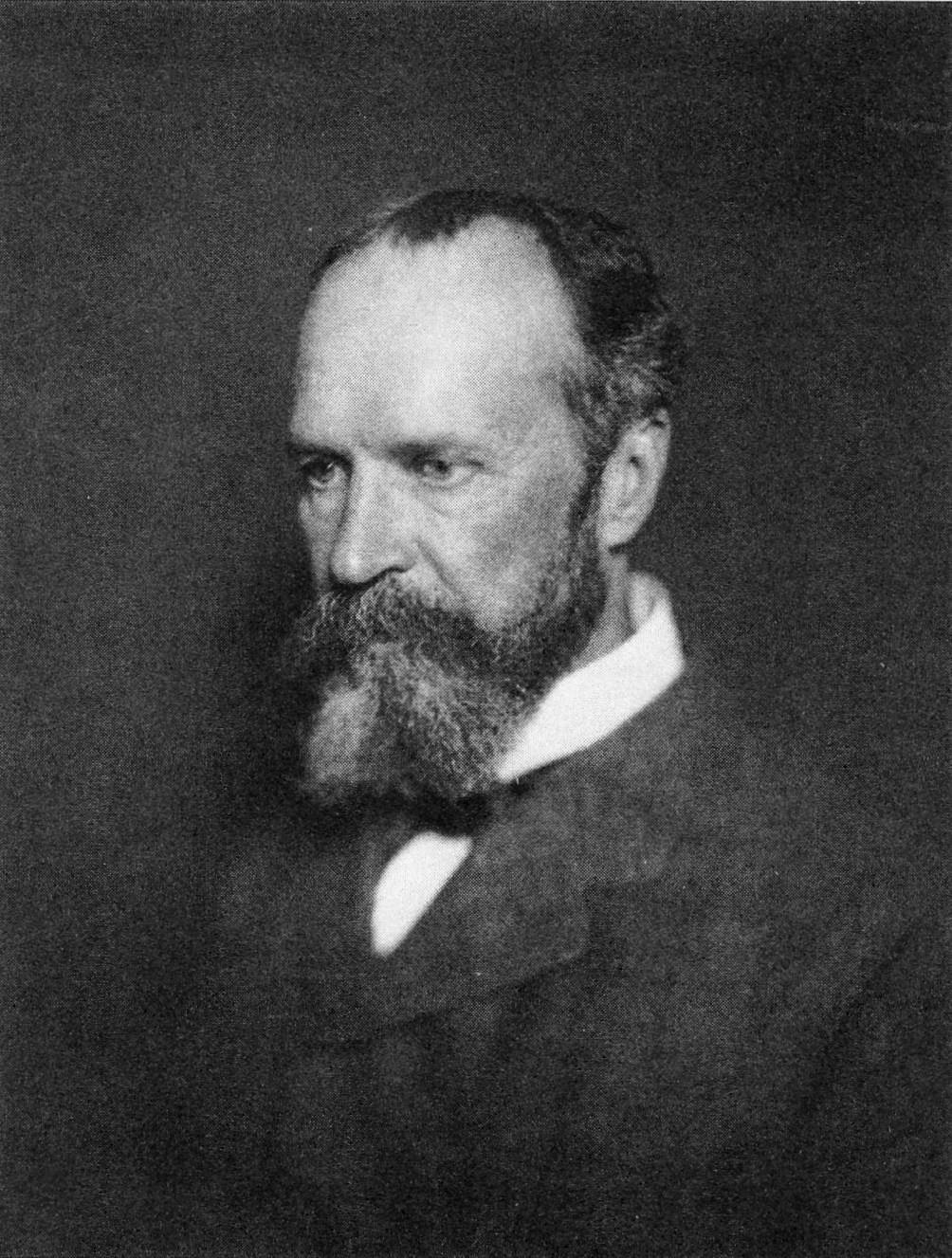
William James (1890s)

Harald Høffding's work was greatly influenced by Kierkegaard, having himself stated that Kierkegaard's thought "has pursued me from my youth, [and] determined the direction of my life." Høffding was a friend of the American philosopher William James, and although James had not read Kierkegaard's works, as they were not yet translated into English, he attended the lectures about Kierkegaard by Høffding and agreed with much of those lectures. James' favorite quote from Kierkegaard came from Høffding: "We live forwards but we understand backwards".

Friedrich von Hügel wrote about Kierkegaard in 1913, saying: "Kierkegaard, the deep, melancholy, strenuous, utterly uncompromising Danish religionist, is a spiritual brother of the great Frenchman, Blaise Pascal, and of the striking English Tractarian, Hurrell Froude, who died young and still full of crudity, yet left an abiding mark upon all who knew him well."

John George Robertson wrote an article called Søren Kierkegaard in 1914: "Notwithstanding the fact that during the last quarter of a century, we have devoted considerable attention to the literatures of the North, the thinker and man of letters whose name stands at the head of the present article is but little known to the English-speaking world ... Kierkegaard, the writer who holds the indispensable key to the intellectual life of Scandinavia, to whom Denmark in particular looks up as her most original man of genius in the nineteenth century, we have wholly overlooked." Robertson wrote previously in Cosmopolis (1898) about Kierkegaard and Nietzsche. Theodor Haecker, based in Munich, published an essay in 1913 titled Kierkegaard and the Philosophy of Inwardness, and David F. Swenson's treatment of Kierkegaard's life and works was published as an issue of Scandinavian Studies and Notes in 1920. Swenson stated: "It would be interesting to speculate upon the reputation that Kierkegaard might have attained, and the extent of the influence he might have exerted, if he had written in one of the major European languages, instead of in the tongue of one of the smallest countries in the world."

Austrian psychologist Wilhelm Stekel (1868–1940) referred to Kierkegaard as the "fanatical follower of Don Juan, himself the philosopher of Don Juanism" in his book Disguises of Love. German psychiatrist and philosopher Karl Jaspers (1883–1969) stated he had been reading Kierkegaard since 1914 and compared Kierkegaard's writings with Hegel's Phenomenology of Mind and the writings of Nietzsche. Jaspers saw Kierkegaard as a champion of Christianity and Nietzsche as a champion for atheism. Later, in 1935, Jaspers emphasized Kierkegaard's (and Nietzsche's) continuing importance for modern philosophy.

==== German and English translators of Kierkegaard's works ====
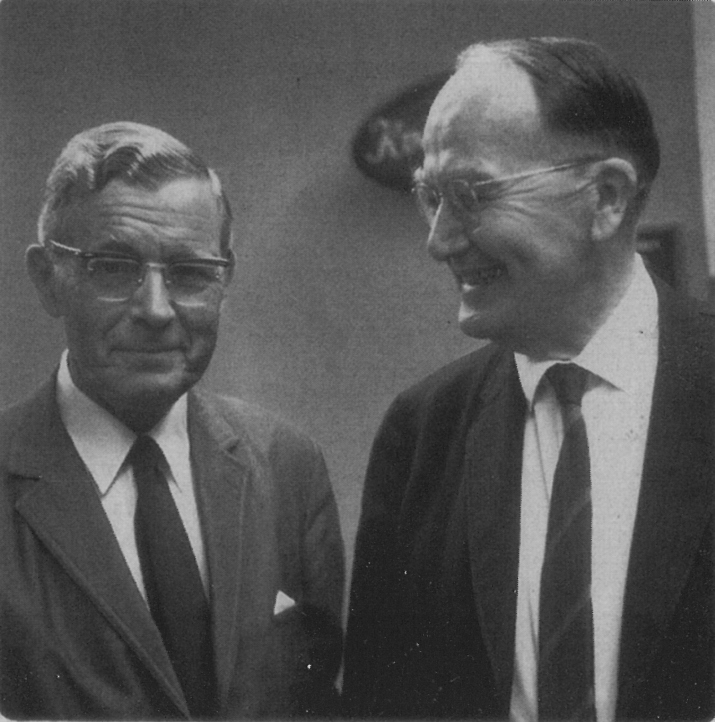
Douglas V. Steere (right) with the Finnish sociologist Heikki Waris in the 1950s

The first translation into German of Kierkegaard's work appeared in 1861, but it was Albert Bärthold who undertook the first substantial program of translating Kierkegaard into German, beginning in 1873. Hermann Gottsche published Kierkegaard's Journals in 1905. It had taken academics 50 years to arrange his journals. Kierkegaard's main works were translated into German by Christoph Schrempf from 1909 onwards. Emmanuel Hirsch released a German edition of Kierkegaard's collected works from 1950 onwards. Both Harald Hoffding's and Schrempf's books about Kierkegaard were reviewed in 1892.

Lee M. Hollander, a scholar of Germanic philology at the University of Texas at Austin, published the first translation of Kierkegaard into English in 1923, though the publication received little attention. In the 1930s, further English translations by Douglas V. Steere, David F. Swenson, Walter Lowrie, and Alexander Dru appeared, the last two translators working under the efforts of Oxford University Press editor Charles Williams, one of the members of the Inklings. Thomas Henry Croxall, another early translator, Lowrie, and Dru all hoped that people would not just read about Kierkegaard but would actually read his works. From the 1960s to the 1990s, Howard V. Hong and Edna H. Hong translated his works more than once. The first volume of their first version of the Journals and Papers (Indiana, 1967–1978) won the 1968 National Book Award for Translation. They both dedicated their lives to the study of Søren Kierkegaard and his works, which are maintained at the Howard V. and Edna H. Hong Kierkegaard Library. Alastair Hannay translated some of Kierkegaard's works for Penguin Classics, starting in 1985 with Fear and Trembling.

==== Kierkegaard's influence on Karl Barth's early theology ====
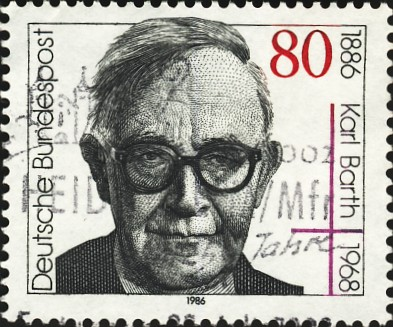
Karl Barth commemorative stamp

Kierkegaard's influence on Karl Barth's early theology is evident in The Epistle to the Romans 1918, 1921, 1933. Barth read at least three volumes of Kierkegaard's works: Practice in Christianity, The Moment, and an Anthology from his journals and diaries. Almost all key terms from Kierkegaard which had an important role in The Epistle to the Romans can be found in Practice in Christianity. The concept of the indirect communication, the paradox, and the moment of Practice in Christianity, in particular, confirmed and sharpened Barth's ideas on contemporary Christianity and the Christian life.

Wilhelm Pauck wrote in 1931 (Karl Barth Prophet of a New Christianity) that Kierkegaard's use of the Latin phrase Finitum Non Capax Infiniti (the finite does not (or cannot) comprehend the infinite) summed up Barth's system. David G. Kingman and Adolph Keller each discussed Barth's relationship to Kierkegaard in their books, The Religious Educational Values in Karl Barth's Teachings (1934) and Karl Barth and Christian Unity (1933). Keller notes the splits that happen when a new teaching is introduced and some assume a higher knowledge from a higher source than others. Students of Kierkegaard became a "group of dissatisfied, excited radicals" when under Barthianism. Eduard Geismar (1871–1939), who gave Lectures on Kierkegaard in March 1936, was not radical enough for them. Barthianism was opposed to the objective treatment of religious questions and to the sovereignty of man in the existential meeting with the transcendent God. But just as students of Hegel broke off into Right and Left, so did the German followers of Barth.

Barth endorses the main theme from Kierkegaard but also reorganizes the scheme and transforms the details. He expands the theory of indirect communication to the field of Christian ethics; he applies the concept of unrecognizability to the Christian life. He coins the concept of the "paradox of faith" since the form of faith entails a contradictory encounter of God and human beings. He also portrayed the contemporaneity of the moment when in crisis a human being desperately perceives the contemporaneity of Christ. In regard to the concept of indirect communication, the paradox, and the moment, the Kierkegaard of the early Barth is a productive catalyst.

William Hubben compared Kierkegaard to Dostoevsky in his 1952 book Four Prophets of Our Destiny, later titled Dostoevsky, Kierkegaard, Nietzsche, and Kafka.

John Daniel Wild noted as early as 1959 that Kierkegaard's works had been "translated into almost every important living language including Chinese, Japanese, and Korean, and it is now fair to say that his ideas are almost as widely known and as influential in the world as those of his great opponent Hegel, still the most potent of world philosophers."

In 1964 Life Magazine traced the history of existentialism from Heraclitus (500BC) and Parmenides over the argument over The Unchanging One as the real and the state of flux as the real. From there to the Old Testament Psalms and then to Jesus and later from Jacob Boehme (1575–1624) to René Descartes (1596–1650) and Blaise Pascal (1623–1662) and then on to Nietzsche and Paul Tillich. Dostoevsky and Camus are attempts to rewrite Descartes according to their own lights and Descartes is the forefather of Sartre through the fact that they both used a "literary style".

Kierkegaard's comparatively early and manifold philosophical and theological reception in Germany was one of the decisive factors of expanding his works' influence and readership throughout the world. Important for the first phase of his reception in Germany was the establishment of the journal Zwischen den Zeiten (Between the Ages) in 1922 by a heterogeneous circle of Protestant theologians: Karl Barth, Emil Brunner, Rudolf Bultmann and Friedrich Gogarten. Their thought would soon be referred to as dialectical theology. At roughly the same time, Kierkegaard was discovered by several proponents of the Jewish-Christian philosophy of dialogue in Germany, namely by Martin Buber, Ferdinand Ebner, and Franz Rosenzweig. In addition to the philosophy of dialogue, existential philosophy has its point of origin in Kierkegaard and his concept of individuality. Martin Heidegger sparsely refers to Kierkegaard in Being and Time (1927), obscuring how much he owes to him. Walter Kaufmann discussed Sartre, Jaspers, and Heidegger in relation to Kierkegaard, and Kierkegaard in relation to the crisis of religion in the 1960s. Later, Kierkegaard's Fear and Trembling (Series Two) and The Sickness Unto Death (Series Three) were included in the Penguin Great Ideas Series (Two and Three).

== Philosophy and theology ==
Kierkegaard has been called a philosopher, a theologian, the "father of existentialism", both atheistic and theistic variations, a literary critic, a social theorist, a humorist, a psychologist, and a poet. Two of his influential ideas are "subjectivity", (Note: Kierkegaard is not an extreme subjectivist; he would not reject the importance of objective truths.) and the notion popularly referred to as "leap of faith". However, the Danish equivalent to the English phrase "leap of faith" does not appear in the original Danish nor is the English phrase found in current English translations of Kierkegaard's works. Kierkegaard does mention the concepts of "faith" and "leap" together many times in his works.

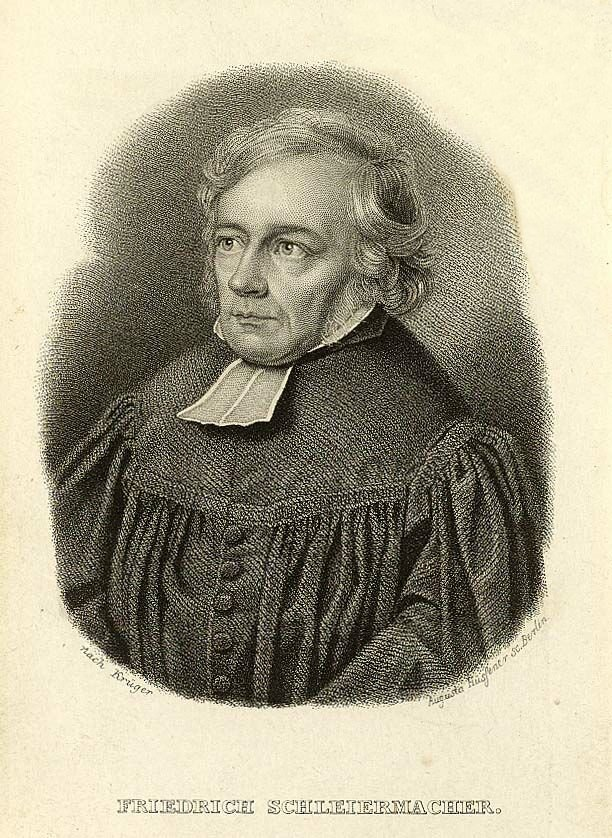
Friedrich Schleiermacher (after Franz Krüger)

The leap of faith is his conception of how an individual would believe in God or how a person would act in love. Faith is not a decision based on evidence that, say, certain beliefs about God are true or a certain person is worthy of love. No such evidence could ever be enough to completely justify the kind of total commitment involved in true religious faith or romantic love. Faith involves making that commitment anyway. Kierkegaard thought that to have faith is at the same time to have doubt. So, for example, for one to truly have faith in God, one would also have to doubt one's beliefs about God; the doubt is the rational part of a person's thought involved in weighing evidence, without which the faith would have no real substance. Someone who does not realize that Christian doctrine is inherently doubtful and that there can be no objective certainty about its truth does not have faith but is merely credulous. For example, it takes no faith to believe that a pencil or a table exists, when one is looking at it and touching it. In the same way, to believe or have faith in God is to know that one has no perceptual or any other access to God, and yet still has faith in God. Kierkegaard writes, "doubt is conquered by faith, just as it is faith which has brought doubt into the world". (Note: Elsewhere, Kierkegaard uses the Faith/Offense dichotomy. In this dichotomy, doubt is the middle ground between faith and taking offense. Offense, in his terminology, describes the threat faith poses to the rational mind. He uses Jesus' words in Matthew 11:6: "And blessed is he, whosoever shall not be offended in me". In Practice in Christianity, Kierkegaard writes: "Just as the concept of "faith" is an altogether distinctively Christian term, so in turn is "offense" an altogether distinctively Christian term relating to faith. The possibility of offense is the crossroad, or it is like standing at the crossroad. From the possibility of offense, one turns either to offense or to faith, but one never comes to faith except from the possibility of offense". In the footnote, he writes, "in the works of some pseudonymous writers it has been pointed out that in modern philosophy there is a confused discussion of doubt where the discussion should have been about despair. Therefore, one has been unable to control or govern doubt either in scholarship or in life. "Despair," however, promptly points in the right direction by placing the relation under the rubric of personality (the single individual) and the ethical. But just as there is a confused discussion of "doubt" instead of a discussion of "despair", So also the practice has been to use the category "doubt" where the discussion ought to be about "offense." The relation, the relation of personality to Christianity, is not to doubt or to believe, but to be offended or to believe. All modern philosophy, both ethically, and Christianly, is based upon frivolousness. Instead of deterring and calling people to order by speaking of being despairing and being offended, it has waved to them and invited them to become conceited by doubting and having doubted. Modern philosophy, being abstract, is floating in metaphysical indeterminateness. Instead of explaining this about itself and then directing people (individual persons) to the ethical, the religious, the existential, philosophy has given the appearance that people are able to speculate themselves out of their own skin, as they so very prosaically say, into pure appearance". He writes that the person is either offended that Christ came as a man and that God is too high to be a lowly man who is actually capable of doing very little to resist. Or Jesus, a man, thought himself too high to consider himself God (blasphemy). Or the historical offence where God a lowly man comes into collision with an established order. Thus, this offensive paradox is highly resistant to rational thought.)

Kierkegaard also stresses the importance of the self, and the self's relation to the world, as being grounded in self-reflection and introspection. He argued in Concluding Unscientific Postscript to Philosophical Fragments that "subjectivity is truth" and "truth is subjectivity." This has to do with a distinction between what is objectively true and an individual's subjective relation (such as indifference or commitment) to that truth. People who in some sense believe the same things may relate to those beliefs quite differently. Two individuals may both believe that many of those around them are poor and deserve help, but this knowledge may lead only one of them to decide to actually help the poor. This is how Kierkegaard put it: "What a priceless invention statistics are, what a glorious fruit of culture, what a characteristic counterpart to the de te narratur fabula [the tale is told about you] of antiquity. Schleiermacher so enthusiastically declares that knowledge does not perturb religiousness, and that the religious person does not sit safeguarded by a lightning rod and scoff at God; yet with the help of statistical tables one laughs at all of life." In other words, Kierkegaard says: "Who has the more difficult task: the teacher who lectures on earnest things a meteor's distance from everyday life—or the learner who should put it to use?" This is how it was summed up in 1940:

"Kierkegaard does not deny the fruitfulness or validity of abstract thinking (science, logic, and so on), but he does deny any superstition which pretends that abstract theorizing is a sufficient concluding argument for human existence. He holds it to be unforgivable pride or stupidity to think that the impersonal abstraction can answer the vital problems of human, everyday life. Logical theorems, mathematical symbols, physical-statistical laws can never become patters of human existence. To be human means to be concrete, to be this person here and now in this particular and decisive moment, face to face with this particular challenge."

— Christopher Sverre Norborg, David F. Swenson, scholar, teacher, friend. Minneapolis, The University of Minnesota, 1940, pp. 20-21

Kierkegaard primarily discusses subjectivity with regard to religious matters. As already noted, he argues that doubt is an element of faith and that it is impossible to gain any objective certainty about religious doctrines such as the existence of God or the life of Christ. The most one could hope for would be the conclusion that it is probable that the Christian doctrines are true, but if someone were to believe such doctrines only to the degree they seemed likely to be true, they would not be genuinely religious at all. Faith consists in a subjective relation of absolute commitment to these doctrines.

=== Philosophical criticism ===
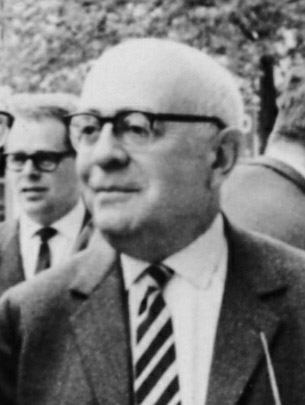
Theodor Adorno in 1964

Kierkegaard's famous philosophical 20th-century critics include Theodor Adorno and Emmanuel Levinas. Non-religious philosophers such as Jean-Paul Sartre and Martin Heidegger supported many aspects of Kierkegaard's philosophical views, but rejected some of his religious views. One critic wrote that Adorno's book Kierkegaard: Construction of the Aesthetic is "the most irresponsible book ever written on Kierkegaard" because Adorno takes Kierkegaard's pseudonyms literally and constructs a philosophy that makes him seem incoherent and unintelligible. Another reviewer says that "Adorno is [far away] from the more credible translations and interpretations of the Collected Works of Kierkegaard we have today."

Levinas' main attack on Kierkegaard focused on his ethical and religious stages, especially in Fear and Trembling. Levinas criticises the leap of faith by saying this suspension of the ethical and leap into the religious is a type of violence. He states: "Kierkegaardian violence begins when existence is forced to abandon the ethical stage in order to embark on the religious stage, the domain of belief. But belief no longer sought external justification. Even internally, it combined communication and isolation, and hence violence and passion. That is the origin of the relegation of ethical phenomena to secondary status and the contempt of the ethical foundation of being which has led, through Nietzsche, to the amoralism of recent philosophies."

Levinas pointed to the Judeo-Christian belief that it was God who first commanded Abraham to sacrifice Isaac and that an angel commanded Abraham to stop. If Abraham were truly in the religious realm, he would not have listened to the angel's command and should have continued to kill Isaac. To Levinas, "transcending ethics" seems like a loophole to excuse would-be murderers from their crime and thus is unacceptable. One interesting consequence of Levinas' critique is that it seemed to reveal that Levinas viewed God as a projection of inner ethical desire rather than an absolute moral agent. However, one of Kierkegaard's central points in Fear and Trembling was that the religious sphere entails the ethical sphere; Abraham had faith that God is always in one way or another ethically in the right, even when He commands someone to kill. Therefore, deep down, Abraham had faith that God, as an absolute moral authority, would never allow him in the end to do something as ethically heinous as murdering his own child, and so he passed the test of blind obedience versus moral choice. He was making the point that God as well as the God-Man Christ doesn't tell people everything when sending them out on a mission and reiterated this in Stages on Life's Way.

Sartre objected to the existence of God: If existence precedes essence, it follows from the meaning of the term sentient that a sentient being cannot be complete or perfect. In Being and Nothingness, Sartre's phrasing is that God would be a pour-soi (a being-for-itself; a consciousness) who is also an en-soi (a being-in-itself; a thing) which is a contradiction in terms. Critics of Sartre rebutted this objection by stating that it rests on a false dichotomy and a misunderstanding of the traditional Christian view of God. Kierkegaard has Judge Vilhelm express the Christian hope this way in Either/Or:

Sartre agreed with Kierkegaard's analysis of Abraham undergoing anxiety (Sartre calls it anguish), but claimed that God told Abraham to do it. In his lecture, Existentialism is a Humanism, Sartre wondered whether Abraham ought to have doubted whether God actually spoke to him. In Kierkegaard's view, Abraham's certainty had its origin in that "inner voice" which cannot be demonstrated or shown to another ("The problem comes as soon as Abraham wants to be understood"). To Kierkegaard, every external "proof" or justification is merely on the outside and external to the subject. Kierkegaard's proof for the immortality of the soul, for example, is rooted in the extent to which one wishes to live forever.

Faith was something that Kierkegaard often wrestled with throughout his writing career; under both his real name and behind pseudonyms, he explored many different aspects of faith. These various aspects include faith as a spiritual goal, the historical orientation of faith (particularly toward Jesus Christ), faith being a gift from God, faith as dependency on a historical object, faith as a passion, and faith as a resolution to personal despair. Even so, it has been argued that Kierkegaard never offers a full, explicit and systematic account of what faith is. Either/Or was published 20 February 1843; it was mostly written during Kierkegaard's stay in Berlin, where he took notes on Schelling's Philosophy of Revelation. According to the Routledge Companion to Philosophy and Religion, Either/Or (vol. 1) consists of essays of literary and music criticism, a set of romantic-like aphorisms, a whimsical essay on how to avoid boredom, a panegyric on the unhappiest possible human being, a diary recounting a supposed seduction, and (vol. II) two enormous didactic and hortatory ethical letters and a sermon. This opinion is a reminder of the type of controversy Kierkegaard tried to encourage in many of his writings both for readers in his own generation and for subsequent generations as well.

== Political views ==
Throughout retrospective analyses Kierkegaard has been viewed as an apolitical philosopher. Despite this, Kierkegaard did publish works of a political nature; this includes his first published essay, criticizing the movement for "women's liberation". Although Kierkegaard's earlier works might include some misogynist statements, a negative view of women is not found in his later works. In these later works, he expressed that men and women are equal before God, showed great respect for certain women, and believed that women are also capable of being faithful.

He attacked Hegelianism via elaborate parody throughout his works from Either/Or to Concluding Unscientific Postscript. Despite his objections to Hegelianism, he expressed an admiration for Hegel personally and would even regard his system favourably if it was proposed as a thought experiment.

Kierkegaard leaned towards conservatism, being a personal friend of Danish king Christian VIII, whom he viewed as the moral superior of every Danish man, woman, and child. He argued against democracy, calling it "the most tyrannical form of government," arguing in favour of monarchy saying "Is it tyranny when one person wants to rule leaving the rest of us others out? No, but it is tyranny when all want to rule." Kierkegaard held strong contempt for the media, describing it as "the most wretched, the most contemptible of all tyrannies". He was critical of the Danish public at the time, labeling them as "the most dangerous of all powers and the most meaningless," writing further in Two Ages: A Literary Review that:

If I were to imagine this public as a person ... I most likely would think of one of the Roman emperors, an imposing, well-fed figure suffering from boredom and therefore craving only the sensate titillation of laughter, for the divine gift of wit is not worldly enough. So this person, more sluggish than he is evil, but negatively domineering, saunters around looking for variety.

Some interpret Kierkegaard's thought as implying that in regards to serving God, sexuality is irrelevant "before God not only for men and women, but also for homosexuals and heterosexuals".

Kierkegaard's political philosophy has been likened to anti-establishment thought and has been described as "a starting point for contemporary political theories".

== Legacy ==
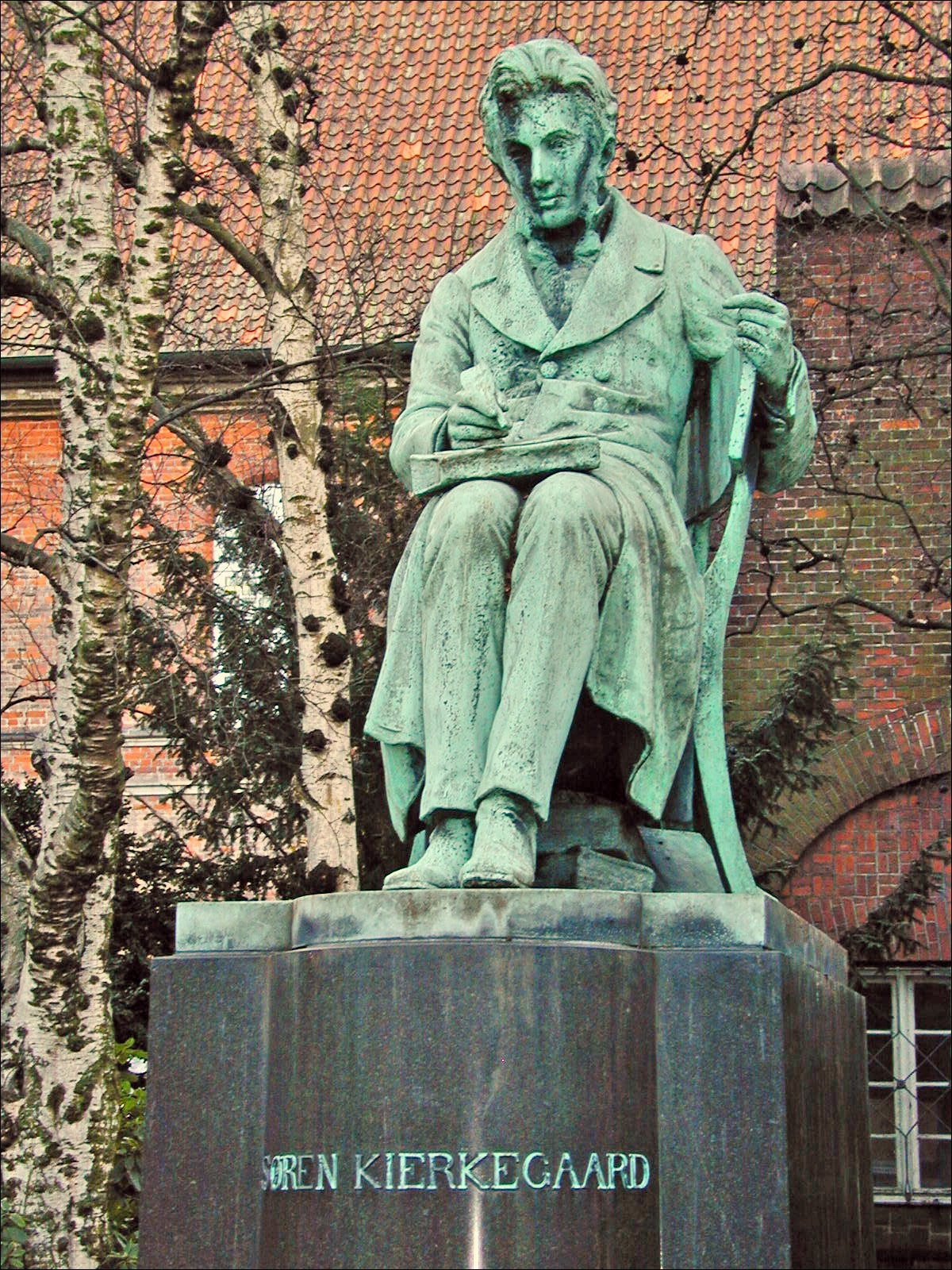
The Søren Kierkegaard Statue in the Royal Library Garden in Copenhagen.

Many 20th-century philosophers, both theistic and atheistic, and theologians drew concepts from Kierkegaard, including the notions of angst, despair, and the importance of the individual. His fame as a philosopher grew tremendously in the 1930s, in large part because the ascendant existentialist movement pointed to him as a precursor, although later writers celebrated him as a highly significant and influential thinker in his own right. University of Copenhagen historian of philosophy Jon Stewart has written extensively about Søren Kierkegaard's thought, and edited a "monumental series" of volumes on Kierkegaard's global reception and impact. Since Kierkegaard was raised as a Lutheran, he was commemorated as a teacher in the Calendar of Saints of the Lutheran Church on 11 November.

Philosophers and theologians influenced by Kierkegaard are numerous and include major twentieth century theologians and philosophers. Paul Feyerabend's epistemological anarchism in the philosophy of science was inspired by Kierkegaard's idea of subjectivity as truth. Ludwig Wittgenstein was immensely influenced and humbled by Kierkegaard, claiming that "Kierkegaard is far too deep for me, anyhow. He bewilders me without working the good effects which he would in deeper souls". Karl Popper referred to Kierkegaard as "the great reformer of Christian ethics, who exposed the official Christian morality of his day as anti-Christian and anti-humanitarian hypocrisy". Hilary Putnam admired Kierkegaard, "for his insistence on the priority of the question, 'How should I live?'". By the early 1930s, Jacques Ellul's three primary sources of inspiration were Karl Marx, Søren Kierkegaard, and Karl Barth. According to Ellul, Marx and Kierkegaard were his two greatest influences, and the only two authors of which he read all of their work. Herbert Read wrote in 1945 "Kierkegaard's life was in every sense that of a saint. He is perhaps the most real saint of modern times."

Kierkegaard has also had a considerable influence on 20th-century literature. Figures deeply influenced by his work include W. H. Auden, Jorge Luis Borges, Don DeLillo, Hermann Hesse, Franz Kafka, David Lodge, Flannery O'Connor, Walker Percy, Rainer Maria Rilke, J.D. Salinger and John Updike. What George Henry Price wrote in his 1963 book The Narrow Pass regarding the "who" and the "what" of Kierkegaard still seems to hold true today: "Kierkegaard was the sanest man of his generation....Kierkegaard was a schizophrenic....Kierkegaard was the greatest Dane....the difficult Dane....the gloomy Dane...Kierkegaard was the greatest Christian of the century....Kierkegaard's aim was the destruction of the historic Christian faith....He did not attack philosophy as such....He negated reason....He was a voluntarist....Kierkegaard was the Knight of Faith....Kierkegaard never found faith....Kierkegaard possessed the truth....Kierkegaard was one of the damned."

Kierkegaard had a profound influence on psychology. He is widely regarded as the founder of Christian psychology and of existential psychology and therapy. Existentialist (often called "humanistic") psychologists and therapists include Ludwig Binswanger, Viktor Frankl, Erich Fromm, Carl Rogers, and Rollo May. May based his The Meaning of Anxiety on Kierkegaard's The Concept of Anxiety. Kierkegaard's sociological work Two Ages: The Age of Revolution and the Present Age critiques modernity. Ernest Becker based his 1974 Pulitzer Prize book The Denial of Death on the writings of Kierkegaard, Freud and Otto Rank. Kierkegaard is also seen as an important precursor of postmodernism. Danish priest Johannes Møllehave has lectured about Kierkegaard. In popular culture, he was the subject of serious television and radio programmes; in 1984, a six-part documentary, Sea of Faith, presented by Don Cupitt, featured an episode on Kierkegaard, while on Maundy Thursday in 2008, Kierkegaard was the subject of a discussion on the BBC Radio 4 programme presented by Melvyn Bragg, In Our Time, during which it was suggested that Kierkegaard straddles the analytic/continental divide. Google honoured him with a Google Doodle on his 200th anniversary. The novel Therapy by David Lodge details a man experiencing a mid-life crisis and becoming obsessed with the works of Kierkegaard.

Kierkegaard is considered by some modern theologians to be the "father of existentialism". Because of his influence (and in spite of it), others only consider either Martin Heidegger or Jean-Paul Sartre to be the actual "father of existentialism". Kierkegaard predicted his posthumous fame, and foresaw that his work would become the subject of intense study and research.

== Selected bibliography ==
- (1841) On the Concept of Irony with Continual Reference to Socrates (Om Begrebet Ironi med stadigt Hensyn til Socrates; dissertation)
- (1843) Either/Or (Enten-Eller)
- (1843) Two Upbuilding Discourses (To opbyggelige Taler)
- (1843) Fear and Trembling (Frygt og Bæven)
- (1843) Three Upbuilding Discourses (Tre opbyggelige Taler)
- (1843) Repetition (Gjentagelsen)
- (1843) Four Upbuilding Discourses (Fire opbyggelige Taler)
- (1844) Two Upbuilding Discourses (To opbyggelige Taler)
- (1844) Three Upbuilding Discourses (Tre opbyggelige Taler)
- (1844) Philosophical Fragments (Philosophiske Smuler)
- (1844) The Concept of Anxiety (Begrebet Angest)
- (1844) Four Upbuilding Discourses (Fire opbyggelige Taler)
- (1845) Three Discourses on Imagined Occasions (Tre Taler ved tænkte Leiligheder)
- (1845) Stages on Life's Way (Stadier paa Livets Vei)
- (1846) Concluding Unscientific Postscript to Philosophical Fragments (Afsluttende uvidenskabelig Efterskrift)
- (1846) Two Ages: A Literary Review (En literair Anmeldelse af S. Kierkegaard)
- (1847) Edifying Discourses in Diverse Spirits (Opbyggelige Taler i forskjellig Aand)
- (1847) Works of Love (Kjerlighedens Gjerninger)
- (1848) Christian Discourses (Christelige Taler)
- (1848, published 1859) The Point of View of My Work as an Author "as good as finished" (IX A 293) (Synspunktet for min Forfatter-Virksomhed. En ligefrem Meddelelse, Rapport til Historien)
- (1849) The Sickness unto Death (Sygdommen til Døden)
- (1849) Three Discourses at the Communion on Fridays ("Ypperstepræsten" – "Tolderen" – "Synderinden", tre Taler ved Altergangen om Fredagen)
- (1850) Practice in Christianity (Indøvelse i Christendom)

== Works cited ==
=== Works by Kierkegaard ===
- Kierkegaard, Søren (1938). The Journals of Søren Kierkegaard: A Selection. Ed. and trans. by Alexander Dru (1959 Reprint ed.). London: Oxford University Press. OCLC 1150101461.
- Kierkegaard, Søren. Søren Kierkegaard's Journals and Papers. Ed. and trans. by Howard V. & Edna H. Hong, assisted by Gregor Malantschuk. Bloomington: Indiana University Press. ISBN 978-0-253-18239-5. 7 vols., 1967–1978.
- Kierkegaard, Søren (1978) [1846]. Two Ages: The Age of Revolution and the Present Age, A Literary Review. Kierkegaard's Writings. Vol. 14. Ed. and trans. by Howard V. & Edna H. Hong (ebook ed.). Princeton: Princeton University Press. doi:10.1515/9781400832286. ISBN 978-1-4008-3228-6.
- Kierkegaard, Søren (1985) [1842–1844]. Philosophical Fragments, or a Fragment of Philosophy/Johannes Climacus, or De omnibus dubitandum est. Kierkegaard's Writings. Vol. 7. Ed. and trans. by Howard V. & Edna H. Hong (ebook ed.). Princeton: Princeton University Press. doi:10.1515/9781400846962. ISBN 978-1-4008-4696-2.
- Kierkegaard, Søren (1989) [1841–1842]. The Concept of Irony, with Continual Reference to Socrates/Notes of Schelling's Berlin Lectures. Kierkegaard's Writings. Vol. 2. Ed. and trans. by Howard V. & Edna H. Hong (ebook ed.). Princeton: Princeton University Press. doi:10.1515/9781400846924. ISBN 978-1-4008-4692-4.
- Kierkegaard, Søren (1991) [1850]. Practice in Christianity. Kierkegaard's Writings. Vol. 20. Ed. and trans. by Howard V. & Edna H. Hong (ebook ed.). Princeton: Princeton University Press. doi:10.1515/9781400847037. ISBN 978-1-4008-4703-7.
- Kierkegaard, Søren (1992) [1846]. Concluding Unscientific Postscript to Philosophical Fragments. Kierkegaard's Writings. Vol. 12/I: Text. Ed. and trans. by Howard V. & Edna H. Hong (ebook ed.). Princeton: Princeton University Press. doi:10.1515/9781400846993. ISBN 978-1-4008-4699-3.
- Kierkegaard, Søren (1998a) [1849/1851/1859]. The Point of View. Kierkegaard's Writings. Vol. 22. Ed. and trans. by Howard V. & Edna H. Hong (ebook ed.). Princeton: Princeton University Press. doi:10.1515/9781400832408. ISBN 978-1-4008-3240-8.
- Kierkegaard, Søren (1998b) [1854–1855]. The Moment and Late Writings. Kierkegaard's Writings. Vol. 23. Ed. and trans. by Howard V. & Edna H. Hong (ebook ed.). Princeton: Princeton University Press. doi:10.1515/9781400832415. ISBN 978-1-4008-3241-5.
- Kierkegaard, Søren (2001) [1846]. A Literary Review. Penguin Classics. Trans. and annontated by Alastair Hannay. London: Penguin Books. ISBN 978-0-14-044801-6.
- Kierkegaard, Søren (2003) [first published in 1999]. Moore, Charles E. (ed.). Provocations: Spiritual Writings of Kierkegaard. Maryknoll: Orbis Books. ISBN 978-1-57075-513-2 – via the Internet Archive.

=== Works by others ===
- Adorno, Theodor (1989). Kierkegaard: Construction of the Aesthetic. Minneapolis: University of Minnesota Press. ISBN 0-8166-1186-6.
- Beck, M. (1928). Referat und Kritik von M.Heidegger: Sein und Zeit (in German). Indiana: Philosophische Hefte 17.
- Bergmann, Samuel Hugo (1991). Dialogical philosophy from Kierkegaard to Buber. New York: SUNY Press. ISBN 978-0-7914-0623-6.
- Bjerregaard, C. H. A. (1889). "Kierkegaard, Søren Aaby". In Jackson, Samuel Macauley (ed.). Concise Dictionary of Religious Knowledge. New York: The Christian Literature Company. pp. 473–475. OCLC 609222608 – via HathiTrust.
- Bösl, Anton (1997). Unfreiheit und Selbstverfehlung: Søren Kierkegaards existenzdialektische Bestimmung von Schuld und Sünde. Freiburger theologische Studien (in German). Freiburg: Herder. ISBN 978-3-451-26408-5.
- Brandes, Georg (1906). Main Currents in Nineteenth Century Literature. Vol. 2.
- Brandes, Georg. "Reminiscences of my Childhood and Youth, pp. 98–108".
- Bremer, Fredrika (1850) [first published in Sartain's Magazine]. "Life in the North". An Easter Offering. Translated by Howitt, Mary. New York: Harper & Brothers. pp. 13–25. OCLC 1043015508 – via the Internet Archive.
- Brink, Lars; Lund, Jørn; Heger, Steffen; Jørgensen, J. Normann (1991). Den Store Danske Udtaleordbog. Munksgaards Ordbøger (in Danish). Copenhagen: Munksgaard. ISBN 978-87-16-06649-7.
- Conway, Daniel W.; Gover, K. E. (2002). Søren Kierkegaard: critical assessments of leading philosophers. London: Taylor & Francis. ISBN 978-0-415-23587-7.
- Creegan, Charles (1989). "Wittgenstein and Kierkegaard". Routledge. Archived from the original on 22 August 2010.
- Crowell, Steven (23 August 2004) [substantive rev. 11 October 2010]. "Existentialism". Stanford Encyclopedia of Philosophy. Metaphysics Research Lab, Stanford University.
- Dorrien, Gary (2012). Kantian Reason and Hegelian Spirit. The Idealistic Logic of Modern Theology (5th ed.). Hoboken, NJ: John Wiley & Sons. ISBN 978-0-470-67331-7.
- Dreyfus, Hubert (1998). Being-in-the-World: A Commentary on Heidegger's Being and Time, Division I. Cambridge, MA: MIT Press. ISBN 978-0-262-54056-8.
- Duncan, Elmer (1976). Søren Kierkegaard: Maker of the Modern Theological Mind. Word Books. ISBN 0-87680-463-6.
- Evans, C. Stephen (1996). "Introduction". Fear and Trembling by Søren Kierkegaard, translated by C. Stephen Evans and Sylvia Walsh. Cambridge: Cambridge University Press. ISBN 978-0-521-84810-7.
- Gardiner, Patrick L. (1969). "Kierkegaard". In Gardiner, Patrick L. (ed.). Nineteenth-Century Philosophy. Readings in the History of Philosophy. New York: The Free Press. pp. 289–320. ISBN 978-0-02-911220-5 – via the Internet Archive.
- Garff, Joakim (2005) [first published in Danish in 2000]. Søren Kierkegaard: A Biography. Translated by Kirmmse, Bruce H. (ebook ed.). Princeton & Oxford: Princeton University Press. doi:10.1515/9781400849604. ISBN 978-1-4008-4960-4. JSTOR j.ctt4cgbw9.
- Gottsched, Hermann (1905). "Buch des Richters: Seine Tagebücher 1833–1855".
- Haecker, Theodor (1950). Journal in the Night. Translated by Dru, Alexander. New York: Pantheon Books. OCLC 894441 – via the Internet Archive.
- Hall, Sharon K (1983). Twentieth-Century Literary Criticism. Detroit: University of Michigan. ISBN 978-0-8103-0221-1.
- Hampson, Daphne (2001). Christian Contradictions: The Structures of Lutheran and Catholic Thought. Cambridge University Press. ISBN 978-0-521-60435-2.
- Hannay, Alastair (2001). Kierkegaard: A Biography. Cambridge & New York: Cambridge University Press. doi:10.1017/CBO9780511498152. ISBN 978-0-511-49815-2.
- Hannay, Alastair; Marino, Gordon D., eds. (1998). The Cambridge Companion to Kierkegaard. Cambridge Companions (ebook ed.). Cambridge University Press. doi:10.1017/CBO9780511498152. ISBN 978-0-511-49815-2.
- Hollander, Lee M. (1960) [first published in 1923]. "Introduction". Selections from the Writings of Kierkegaard. Translated by Hollander, Lee M. (rev. ed.). Garden City, NY: Anchor Books. pp. 1–33. OCLC 243317 – via the Internet Archive.
- Howland, Jacob (2006). Kierkegaard and Socrates: A Study in Philosophy and Faith. Cambridge: Cambridge University Press. ISBN 0-521-86203-5.
- Hubben, William (1962). Dostoevsky, Kierkegaard, Nietzsche, and Kafka: Four Prophets of Our Destiny. New York: Collier Books.
- Hutchens, Benjamin C (2004). Levinas: a guide for the perplexed?. London: Continuum International Publishing Group. ISBN 978-0-8264-7282-3.
- Jansen, F. J. Billeskov (23 April 2023) [first published 1981]. "Søren Kierkegaard". Dansk Biografisk Leksikon (in Danish). Archived from the original on 9 October 2024 – via Lex.dk.
- Jaspers, Karl (1935). Vernunft und Existenz. Fünf Vorlesungen (in German). Groningen & Batavia [Jakarta]: J. B. Wolters.
- Kalkar, Christian Andreas Herman (August 1858). "Denmark. Remarks on the State of the Danish National Church". European Intelligence. Evangelical Christendom: Its State and Prospects. 12. London: Evangelical Alliance: 269–274. OCLC 656581214 – via HathiTrust.
- Kangas, David (1998). "Kierkegaard, the Apophatic Theologian, David Kangas, Yale University" (PDF). Enrahonar No. 29, Departament de Filosofia, Universitat Autònoma de Barcelona. Archived from the original (PDF) on 18 July 2011.
- Katz, Claire Elise (2003). "The Voice of God and the Face of the Other". Journal of Textual Reasoning. 2. doi:10.21220/s2-5e6v-2k39.
- Kirmmse, Bruce H., ed. (1996). Encounters with Kierkegaard: A Life as Seen by His Contemporaries. Translated by Kirmmse, Bruce H.; Laursen, Virginia R. (ebook ed.). Princeton: Princeton University Press. doi:10.1515/9780691221885. ISBN 978-0-691-22188-5.
- Kirmmse, Bruce (2000). "Review of Habib Malik, Receiving Søren Kierkegaard". Stolaf. Archived from the original on 20 May 2008.
- Kosch, Michelle (1996). Freedom and reason in Kant, Schelling, and Kierkegaard. Oxford: Oxford University Press. ISBN 978-0-19-928911-0.
- Leak, Andrew (2011). "Existentialism". In Burgwinkle, William; Hammond, Nicholas; Wilson, Emma (eds.). The Cambridge History of French Literature (ebook ed.). Cambridge University Press. pp. 585–593. doi:10.1017/CHOL9780521897860.067. ISBN 978-0-511-97632-2.
- Lippitt, John (2003). Routledge Philosophy Guidebook to Kierkegaard and Fear and Trembling. London: Routledge. ISBN 978-0-415-18047-4.
- Lippitt, John; Evans, C. Stephen (22 May 2023). "Søren Kierkegaard". Stanford Encyclopedia of Philosophy. Metaphysics Research Lab, Stanford University.
- Lowrie, Walter (1942). A Short Life of Kierkegaard. Princeton: Princeton University Press.
- Lowrie, Walter (1962) [first published in 1938]. Kierkegaard. Vol. 1 (1st Harper Torchbook ed.). New York: Harper & Brothers. OCLC 602868 – via the Internet Archive.
- Lowrie, Walter (1968). Kierkegaard's Attack Upon Christendom. Princeton: Princeton University Press.
- MacIntyre, Alasdair (2001). "Once More on Kierkegaard". Kierkegaard after MacIntyre. Chicago: Open Court Publishing. ISBN 0-8126-9452-X.
- Mackey, Louis (1971). Kierkegaard: A Kind of Poet. Philadelphia: University of Pennsylvania Press. ISBN 0-8122-1042-5.
- Malantschuk, Gregor; Hong, Howard; Hong, Edna (2003). Kierkegaard's concept of existence. Milwaukee: Marquette University Press. ISBN 978-0-87462-658-2.
- Martensen, Hans Lassen (1871). Christian Ethics (General Part). Clark's Foreign Theological Library, 3rd Series. Vol. 39. Translated by Spence, C. Edinburgh: T. & T. Clark. OCLC 866874021 – via the Internet Archive.
- Masugata, Kinya (9 July 1999). "Kierkegaard's Reception in Japan". Kinya Masugata. Archived from the original on 11 June 2007.
- Matustik, Martin Joseph; Westphal, Merold, eds. (1995). Kierkegaard in Post/Modernity. Bloomington: Indiana University Press. ISBN 0-253-20967-6.
- McDonald, William (n.d.). "Søren Kierkegaard (1813—1855)". Internet Encyclopedia of Philosophy. ISSN 2161-0002. Archived from the original on 17 September 2024.
- McDonald, William (3 December 1996) [substantive rev. 10 November 2017]. "Søren Kierkegaard". Stanford Encyclopedia of Philosophy. Metaphysics Research Lab, Stanford University.
- McGee, Kyle. "Fear and Trembling in the Penal Colony". Kafka Project. Archived from the original on 28 June 2010.
- McGrath, Alister E. (1993). The Blackwell Encyclopedia of Modern Christian Thought. Oxford: Blackwell Publishing. ISBN 0-631-19896-2.
- Meyer, Michael (1985). Strindberg. New York: Random House. ISBN 978-0-394-50442-1 – via the Internet Archive.
- Morgan, Marcia (September 2003). Adorno's Reception of Kierkegaard: 1929–1933 (PDF). University of Potsdam.
- Nostbakken, Roger Wesley (1962). The theology of Gisle Christian Johnson: an inquiry into its sources, its nature and its significance (ThD thesis). Princeton Theological Seminary. OCLC 936470209.
- Oden, Thomas C (2004). The Humor of Kierkegaard: An Anthology. Princeton: Princeton University Press. ISBN 0-691-02085-X.
- Ostenfeld, Ib; McKinnon, Alastair (1972). Søren Kierkegaard's Psychology. Waterloo: Wilfrid Laurer University Press. ISBN 0-88920-068-8.
- Pattison, George (2005). The Philosophy of Kierkegaard. Montreal: McGill-Queen's Press. ISBN 978-0-7735-2987-8.
- Petersen, Nora M.; Schierup, Stine, eds. (2015). "Kierkegaard: In vino veritas". Vin og kærlighed - Det græske symposion [Wine and Love - The Greek Symposium] (in Danish). Nationalmuseet. Archived from the original on 27 September 2024.
- Pfleiderer, Otto (1887) [based on 2nd German edition published 1883–1884]. The Philosophy of Religion On the Basis of Its History: Schelling to the Present Day. Vol. 2. Translated by Menzies, Allan. London & Edinburgh: Williams and Norgate. OCLC 555200934 – via HathiTrust.
- Pugliese, Riccardo (2024). The Dizziness of Freedom in Kierkegaard and Sartre. Cham: Palgrave Macmillan. ISBN 978-3-031-38137-9.
- Poole, Roger (1998). "The unknown Kierkegaard: Twentieth-century receptions". In Hannay, Alastair; Marino, Gordon D. (eds.). The Cambridge Companion to Kierkegaard. Cambridge Companions (ebook ed.). Cambridge University Press. pp. 48–75. doi:10.1017/CBO9780511498152. ISBN 978-0-511-49815-2.
- Popper, Karl (2020). The Open Society and Its Enemies. Princeton: Princeton University Press. ISBN 978-0-691-21206-7.
- Pyle, Andrew (1999). Key philosophers in conversation: the Cogito interviews. London: Routledge. ISBN 978-0-415-18036-8.
- Rorty, Richard (1989). Contingency, Irony, and Solidarity. Cambridge: Cambridge University Press. ISBN 0-521-36781-6.
- Rose, Mary Carman (1983). "Foreword to the ROSE Edition". Something About Kierkegaard. By Swenson, David F. Swenson, Lillian Marvin (ed.). (ROSE ed.). Macon, GA: Mercer University Press. pp. xiii–xxiv. ISBN 978-0-86554-084-2 – via the Internet Archive.
- Sartre, Jean-Paul (1946). "Existentialism is a Humanism". World Publishing Company.
- Sartre, Jean-Paul (1969). Being and nothingness: an essay on phenomenological ontology?. London: Routledge. ISBN 978-0-415-04029-7.
- "Søren Kierkegaard". Encyclopaedia of religion and ethics. Vol. 7. 1908. pp. 696–699.
- Schulz-Behrend, George; Lehmann, Winfred P.; Miller, David L.; Willson, A. Leslie (7 May 1976). "In Memoriam: Lee M. Hollander" (PDF). University of Texas at Austin Faculty Council. Archived from the original (PDF) on 9 July 2003.
- Smith, Ronald Gregor (1960). J. G. Hamann, 1730–1788: A Study in Christian Existence, with Selections From His Writings. New York: Harper & Brothers. OCLC 1234749 – via the Internet Archive.
- Stern, Kenneth (1990). "Kierkegaard on Theistic Proof". Religious studies. 26 (2). Cambridge: 219–226. doi:10.1017/S0034412500020370. S2CID 170283075.
- Stewart, Jon, ed. (2009). Kierkegaard's International Reception: Northern and Western Europe. Kierkegaard Research: Sources, Reception and Resources. Vol. 8, Tome 1. Farnham & Burlington: Ashgate. ISBN 978-0-7546-6496-3.
- Stewart, Jon, ed. (2012a). Kierkegaard's Influence on Theology: Anglophone and Scandinavian Protestant Theology. Kierkegaard Research: Sources, Reception and Resources. Vol. 10, Tome 2. Farnham & Burlington: Ashgate. ISBN 978-1-4094-4479-4.
- Stewart, Jon, ed. (2012b). Kierkegaard's Influence on Philosophy: German and Scandinavian Philosophy. Kierkegaard Research: Sources, Reception and Resources. Vol. 11, Tome 1. Farnham & Burlington: Ashgate. ISBN 978-1-4094-4285-1.
- Stewart, Jon, ed. (2012c). Kierkegaard's Influence on Philosophy: Anglophone Philosophy. Kierkegaard Research: Sources, Reception and Resources. Vol. 11, Tome 3. Farnham & Burlington: Ashgate. ISBN 978-1-4094-4055-0.
- Stewart, Jon, ed. (2013a). Kierkegaard's Influence on Literature, Criticism and Art: The Germanophone World. Kierkegaard Research: Sources, Reception and Resources. Vol. 12, Tome 1. Farnham & Burlington: Ashgate. ISBN 978-1-4094-5611-7.
- Stewart, Jon, ed. (2013b). Kierkegaard's Influence on Literature, Criticism and Art: Sweden and Norway. Kierkegaard Research: Sources, Reception and Resources. Vol. 12, Tome 3. Farnham & Burlington: Ashgate. ISBN 978-1-4094-6513-3.
- Stewart, Jon (2015). "Editor's Introduction: Kierkegaard and the Rich Field of Kierkegaard Studies". In Stewart, Jon (ed.). A Companion to Kierkegaard. Blackwell Companions to Philosophy. Chichester & Malden: Wiley. pp. 1–18. doi:10.1002/9781118783795.ch0. ISBN 978-1-118-78379-5.
- Strindberg, August (1912). Plays by August Strindberg: First Series. Translated by Björkman, Edwin. New York: Charles Scribner's Sons. OCLC 2579484 – via the Internet Archive.
- Swenson, David F. (February 1920). Flom, George T. (ed.). "Sören Kierkegaard". Scandinavian Studies and Notes. 6 (1). Society for the Advancement of Scandinavian Study: 1–41. JSTOR 40915066.
- Updike, John (1997). "Foreword". The Seducer's Diary by Søren Kierkegaard. Princeton: Princeton University Press. ISBN 0-691-01737-9.
- Vahl, Jens (April 1856) [dated 23 January 1856]. "Denmark. The Doctrines of Dr. Kierkegaard—Accusations Against the State Church—Independent Lutheran Church of Copenhagen". European Intelligence. Evangelical Christendom: Its State and Prospects. 10. London: Evangelical Alliance: 127–129. OCLC 656581214 – via HathiTrust.
- Veninga, Jennifer Elisa (2009). "The Danish Cartoon Controversy as Viewed by Kierkegaard and Appadurai: The Social Imagination and the Numerical". In Perkins, Robert L. (ed.). The Moment and Late Writings. International Kierkegaard Commentary. Vol. 23. Macon: Mercer University Press. pp. 253–282. ISBN 978-0-88146-160-2 – via the Internet Archive.
- Walsh, Sylvia (2009). Kierkegaard: Thinking Christianly in an Existential Mode?. Oxford: Oxford University Press. ISBN 978-0-19-920836-4.
- Watkin, Julia (1997). Kierkegaard (2000 Reissue ed.). London & New York: Continuum. ISBN 978-0-8264-5086-9.
- Weston, Michael (1994). Kierkegaard and Modern Continental Philosophy. London: Routledge. ISBN 0-415-10120-4.
- Westphal, Merold (1996). Becoming a Self: A Reading of Kierkegaard's Concluding Unscientific Postscript. West Lafayette, Indiana: Purdue Press. ISBN 978-1-55753-089-9.
- Westphal, Merold (1997). "Kierkegaard and Hegel". The Cambridge Companion to Kierkegaard. Cambridge: Cambridge University Press. ISBN 0-521-47719-0.
- Wyschogrod, Michael (1954). Kierkegaard and Heidegger. The Ontology of Existence. London: Routledge.
