= Infinite qualitative distinction =

Concept in philosophy

The fundamental error of modern times lies in the fact that the yawning abyss of quality in the difference between God and man has been removed. The result in dogmatic theology is a mockery of God ...

— Søren Kierkegaard, Journals, November 20, 1847

The infinite qualitative distinction (Danish: den uendelige kvalitative forskel; German: unendliche qualitative Unterschied; Dutch: oneindig kwalitatief onderscheid), sometimes translated as infinite qualitative difference, is a fundamental concept in Christian theology. More colloquially, it is referred to as the Creator/creature distinction or the Categorical Distinction. In its present form, it is usually attributed to Danish philosopher Søren Kierkegaard. The distinction emphasizes the very different attributes of finite and temporal men and the infinite and eternal qualities of a supreme being. This concept can be said to fit into the apophatic theological tradition, although is generally considered a significant feature of classical Christian theology proper cross-traditionally, being found in confessional Lutheran, Reformed, Neo-Orthodox, and Anglican theologies. It is fundamentally at odds with theological theories which posit a supreme being able to be fully understood by man, found in strains of rationalist Enlightenment and post-Enlightenment thought, although such a claim is rare. The theologian Karl Barth made the concept of infinite qualitative distinction a cornerstone of his theology.

== Historical Overview ==
The infinite qualitative distinction as measure of conceptual metaphysical distance recedes back at least into Lutheran scholasticism. Robert Preus speaks of "the infinite difference (infinita distantia) between God and man, a doctrine which Lutheranism wished ardently to uphold." The discussion often arose within the context of analogical use of language about God. Preus quotes the German dogmatician David Hollatz:

Between God and His creatures there does obtain an infinite positive distance in that God in His absolute perfection and majesty infinitely excels His creatures. But we must not conclude from this that God and His creatures have no attributes in common and that no concept will fit them both. For since God is one who shares His goodness and perfection, He has imparted many streams of His goodness and many rays of His perfection to His creatures, with the result that they possess a certain, though limited, degree of perfection.

=== Hans Lassen Martensen ===
Immediately prior to Kierkegaard, Hans Lassen Martensen emphasized the infinite qualitative in distinction in his teachings. Martensen had been Kierkegaard's theology instructor, eventually becoming an interlocutor with him. In his Christian Dogmatics, Martensen writes, "And yet there is an infinite distinction between the eternal, the Almighty Creator of heaven and earth, and the finite, limited human creature who is dust and ashes,-a chasm which seems incapable of being filled. Christianity solves this problem by its gospel of the Incarnation of God in Christ." Given the similarity in language there may be a genetic relationship between the concept as articulated by Martensen and that by Kierkegaard.

=== Søren Kierkegaard ===
For Kierkegaard, direct communication with God is impossible, as God and man are infinitely different. He argues that indirect communication with God is the only way of communication. For example, in Christian belief, the Incarnation posits that Jesus Christ is God incarnate. The infinite qualitative distinction is opposed to rational theology in the sense that, whereas the latter argues one can prove empirically Jesus is God incarnate, the former argues that empirical evidence is ultimately insufficient in making that conclusion. The paradoxical nature of the Incarnation, that God is embodied in a man, is offensive to reason, and can only be comprehended indirectly, through faith.

Kierkegaard doesn't believe God is so objective toward human beings but rather that he is the absolute subjective being. He put it this way in 1846:

The subjective thinker is a dialectician dealing with the existential, and he has the passion of thought requisite for holding fast to the qualitative disjunction. But on the other hand, if the qualitative is applied in empty isolation, if it is applied to the individual in an altogether abstract fashion, one may risk saying something infinitely decisive and be quite correct in what one says, and yet, ludicrously enough, say nothing at all. Hence it is a psychologically noteworthy phenomenon, that the absolute disjunction may be used quite disingenuously, precisely for the purpose of evasion. When the death-penalty is affixed to every crime, it ends in no crime being punished at all. So also in the case of the injunction. Applied abstractly it becomes an unpronounceable mute letter, or if pronounced, it says nothing. The subjective thinker has the absolute disjunction ready to hand; therefore, as an essential existential moment he holds it fast with a thinker's passion, but he holds it as a last decisive resort, to prevent everything from being reduced to merely quantitative differences. He holds it in reserve, but does not apply it so as by recurring to it abstractly to inhibit existence. Hence the subjective thinker adds to his equipment aesthetic and ethical passion, which gives him the necessary concreteness. All existential problems are passionate problems, for when existence is interpenetrated with reflection it generates passion.

For Kierkegaard, then, the infinite qualitative distinction is a correlate of the paradox that is incumbent on the subject thinker in considering "the absolute paradox," i.e., "That God has existed in human form, has been born, grown up, and so forth..." (in other words, the classic Christian doctrine of the incarnation of the Word in Christ). This epistemic dissonance is what catalyzes the infinite qualitative distinction:

...[T]he absolute difference between God and man consists precisely in this, that man is a particular existing being (which is just as much true of the most gifted human being as it is of the most stupid), whose essential task cannot be to think sub specie aeterni, since as long as he exists he is, though eternal, essentially an existing individual, whose essential task it is to concentrate upon inwardness in existing; while God is infinite and eternal.

=== Gisle Johnson ===
Norwegian dogmatician, Pietist, and revivalist Gisle Johnson (1822–1894) also developed a concept of the infinite qualitative distinction constructively from the assumption of Kierkegaard's categories of faith and subjectivity, Gisle having early linguistic access to Kierkegaard's writings due to the early Dano-Norske spoken in Norway at the time. Gisle's line of thought in his seminal work, Grundrids af den Systematisk Theologi (posth. 1898), builds foundationally on the assumption that theology must be both scientific and yet subjective: "Systematic theology is the main branch of Christian theology, whose task is to know Christianity from its subjective side" (s. 1). As such, Gisle considers that subjective knowledge is the cognitive principle from which the science of theology proceeds: "Systematic theology is the scientific knowledge of the Christian faith in its essence, its essential truth content, and its essential form of life" (s. 2). This means that, throughout its development, such subjective truth-content must necessarily look outward, especially in the second stage of faith, Law-Faith:

In the knowledge of the moral law, the recognition of God as the originator of this law is also essential, as a subject (Subjekt) absolutely exalted above man, where in the law he announces his holy will. Although essentially an expression of its own higher, true self, the law nevertheless confronts him as something objectively given, an objective power, to which his will must submit, and which thus necessarily reflects it back to a personal will different from his own will, in whose absolute sovereignty over it lies the essential foundation of its unconditional validity, of the absolute authority with which it makes itself valid (s. 17).

For Gisle, the infinite qualitative distinction is thus a correlate of the essence of faith under the law, a distinctly Lutheran concept related to the Law-Gospel paradigm. However, it also finds further articulation in the context of discussing causality and cosmology; in a passage that sounds close to Kierkegaard, Gisle writes:

In his causal relationship to it [the world], he reveals himself not only as the one who absolutely wills and absolutely knows, but also as the one who absolutely Is, and as such he stands in all his activity and in all his characterizing attributes in profound opposition to the world as one which is different from it in the whole of which it is, and from the absolutely unconditional Being, as one who is absolutely exalted above all its finitude, with all its peculiar barriers: the infinite God.

=== Herman Bavinck ===
The concept of God's incomprehensibility related to his infinite absoluteness of being is a central and defining feature of Dutch theologian Herman Bavinck, who began the second volume of his Reformed Dogmatics with the locus of divine incomprehensibility. According to Bavinck, "Mystery is the lifeblood of dogmatics." Drawing on classically Reformed distinctions between God's archetypal knowledge ad intra and his ectypal knowledge ad extra, Bavinck contemplates the classical problem of theological language, positing, "But the moment we dare to speak about God the question arises: How can we?" This is expressed in terms of the infinite qualitative distinction: "The distinction between God and us is the gulf between the Infinite and the finite, between eternity and time, between being and becoming, between the All and the nothing. However little we know of God, the faintest notion implies that he is a being who is infinitely exalted above every creature." Nonetheless, the nature of Scripture as revelation itself both upholds the knowability and effability of God, while presupposing this fundamental ontological reality: "While Holy Scripture affirms this truth in the strongest terms, it nonetheless sets forth a doctrine of God that fully upholds his knowability." For Bavinck, this is overcome by the fact that "God is a person, a conscious and freely willed being, not confined to the world but exalted high above it." Within his self-revelation, God can be known, yet never exhaustively: "Neither in creation nor in re-creation does God reveal himself exhaustively. He cannot fully impart himself to creatures. For that to be possible they themselves would have to be divine. There is, therefore, not exhaustive knowledge of God." Importantly, for Bavinck, the absoluteness of God, and the mystery of his nature in himself, is not at odds with his personality; in fact, the former is grounds for the latter. For Bavinck, it is because God's personality is predicated on the infinite divine essence that God can be knowable, what he called "an adorable mystery," in contrast with what he diagnoses as a pantheistic dualism:

But mystery and self-contradiction are not synonymous ... To say that God is the infinite One and can and does nevertheless reveal himself in finite creatures, though this belief is a recognition of an incomprehensible mystery—the miracle of creation, after all—is by no means the admission of a palpable absurdity. The finite cannot diminish the infinity of God if it is only grounded in God's Absolute being.

=== Karl Barth ===
Barth's book The Epistle to the Romans also emphasizes such a gulf. In the preface to the Second Edition of his commentary, Barth writes, "if I have a system, it is limited to a recognition of what Kierkegaard called the 'infinite qualitative distinction' between time and eternity, and to my regarding this as possessing negative as well as positive significance: 'God is in heaven, and thou art on earth'. The relation between such a God and such a man, and the relation between such a man and such a God, is for me the theme of the Bible and the essence of philosophy."

=== John Webster ===
Theologian John Webster has done much to extend a dogmatic consideration of the concept of the infinite qualitative distinction. His doctoral dissertation, Distinguishing Between God and Man: Aspects of the Theology of Eberhard Jüngel (1982), posited that all of theology is a commentary on the distinction between Creator and creation. The uniqueness of God in himself as a being par excellence is a driving factor in Webster's theological construction. In his article, "Trinity and Creation" (2010), Webster describes the infinite qualitative distinction as "'the Christian distinction,' that is, the difference between God and creatures which is beyond both reciprocity and dialectic," going on to specify that "The difference between creator and creature is infinite, not just 'very great'..." For Webster, "God and creatures are incommensurable, and God's presence and action in time does not entail that his relation to creatures is a real relation." Distinguishing such, God's nature is a se, or from himself, a life proper in its fullest sense only to the Trinity: "God is a se in the eternal fullness of the loving relations of Father, Son and Spirit. From himself he has life in himself. But God is not only from himself in his inner life, but also the external works which arise from and correspond to his inner life." He will thus speak of "the asymmetrical relation of God and creatures," where all things flow from God's gratuitous decree and are constituted good by virtue of creatio ex nihilo (creation out of nothing):

Christian teaching about the creation of the world out of nothing is a cardinal doctrine: on this hinge turn all the elements of the second topic of Christian theology, which treats of all things with reference to God their beginning and end, the first topic being God's immanent life. In his work of creation, God inaugurates an order of being other than himself, and this work is presupposed in all subsequent assertions about that order of being, for to create is to bring something into existence...

For Webster, the infinite qualitative distinction thus realizes the uniqueness of language that can be drawn from the fact that "deus non est in genere" (God is not in a genre), which he considers "the rule which is basic to the Christian doctrine of the Trinity." He formulates it thus: "Concepts developed in articulating the Christian doctrine of God, including the concept of aseity, are fitting insofar as they correspond to the particular being of the triune God in his self-moved self-presentation." Such concepts are an extension of the analogia entis, Webster retrieving many of these concepts from Thomas Aquinas in his life-long endeavor to articulate what he called "Theological Theology."
