= Thomas Henry Croxall =

Thomas Henry Croxall was an English minister in Copenhagen, instrumental in translating the work of Søren Kierkegaard and introducing him to an English audience.

Croxall is notable because he was interested in the writings of Søren Kierkegaard for their Christian content. He wrote after David F. Swenson and Walter Lowrie had begun translating some of Kierkegaard's works into English, both also hoping to attract Christian readers. Croxall translated Søren Kierkegaard, by Johannes Edouard Hohlenberg, 1954. He studied Søren Kierkegaard's writings for over twenty years and translated Johannes Climacus written in 1843-1844 by Kierkegaard but never published and provided his own assessment. He related Kierkegaard's works to the scriptures in his books Meditations and Kierkegaard Studies, where he wrote: "Kierkegaard is in the air these days. He has not yet, so far as I know, become on the air, but that doubtless will come, for he is constantly quoted and discussed (discussed, I fear, more than read). What then is all the fuss about, and what is his distinctive teaching? Now, any lover of Kierkegaard (and such I most certainly am) longs to answer such a question. He has found in Kierkegaard's teaching a new and stimulating body of thought, which to him is like a pearl of great price, worth anything to possess. But since the pearl is spiritual treasure, not material, that treasure must be shared if its value is not to diminish. Hence I desire to share the treasure." Studies 1948 p. 11.

Croxall provides the reader with a "wealth of beauty, fragrance, and sustenance" in his Meditations. Most of the meditations came from the Journals and Papers of Søren Kierkegaard from Croxall's own translations. He recognized, in 1944, the need for better translations of Kierkegaard's works. His translation, he said, "is "new"; I mean in its form and presentation. Søren Kierkegaard is a deep philosopher, but he is first and foremost a Christian; a penetrating student and exponent of the Scriptures; and above all, a man of prayer and meditation, who, as he himself confesses, spent every day in the quiet of his chamber with God." Meditations 1955 p. 1.

== Interpretation ==
Croxall is one of a number of Christian authors who argued that Kierkegaard's work is Christian to the core, that "his interest is religious or exclusively Christian."

"Kierkegaard is Christian. Some 'existentialists' – Berdyaev, Dostoevsky, Unamuno, "Maritain, Chestov, Marcel – concur in being, in varying degrees, Christian too. Many, however-Bataille, Sartre, Camus, Jaspers, Heidegger are atheistic, so that atheism and existentialism are sometimes thought synonymous. These writers 'extract from religion its most useful attributes and re-secularize them, making a ‘corner' in thought.'" Studies 1948 p. 60.

Croxall translated Kierkegaard's works in the aftermath of World War II. He says, again from Kierkegaard Studies, "Need I say that our age, with its industrial "massification", its twin tyrannies of newspaper and ballot-box (present to-day just as they were in Kierkegaard's time: unknown to Kierkegaard, those of the radio and the cinema), its trade unions, federations, combines; its feverish enslavement to fashion; its indecision and bewilderment about the meaning and purpose of life; its pursuit of pleasure and of the false gods of aestheticism, superstition, and selfishness, its belief that it has "gone farther" than Christianity, when really it has scarcely even approached Christianity (Heaven turn us from continuing along the path which has disastrously taken us "farther"!)-all this and much more shows that we are in as dire need as were his contemporaries, of Kierkegaard's great doctrine of the Individual." Studies 1948 p. 15.

Some of his references include: Kierkegaard: The Prophet of the Now, by T.S. Gregory, November 21, 1946; The Prophet of the Absolute, by H.V. Martin; Lectures on the Religious thought of Kierkegaard (Lecture IV), Geismar, Augsburg Publishing House; Philosophy, July 1941, by Professor Dorothy Emmet; Existentialism: Disintegration of Man's Soul, Guido De Ruggiero, 1948, Social Sciences Publishers Inc. New York

== Bibliography ==
- The Crowd is the Lie, T.H. Croxall, Presbyter, February 1945
- Kierkegaard studies, with special reference to (a) the Bible (b) our own age. Thomas Henry Croxall, Published: 1948
- Søren Kierkegaard, by Johannes Edouard Hohlenberg, translated by T. H. Croxall, Routledge & Kegan Paul, London 1954
- Meditations from Kierkegaard, Translated and Edited by T. H. Croxall, Philadelphia, The Westminster Press 1956
- Kierkegaard Commentary by T.H. Croxall, James Nisbet & Co. 1956
- Johannes Climacus, by Søren Kierkegaard, Translated by T.H. Croxall, Stanford University Press 1958
- Glimpses and impressions of Kierkegaard, Welwyn, Herts, J. Nisbet 1959
