= Walter Lowrie (author) =

Theologian and translator

Walter Lowrie (April 26, 1868 – August 12, 1959) was a Kierkegaardian theologian and translator.

== Biography ==
He was born in Philadelphia. Lowrie received his B.A. in 1890, and his M.A. in 1893, both from Princeton University. He studied in Germany, Italy, and Switzerland in 1893–1894. Upon his return home he joined the Episcopal Church. Lowrie was ordained deacon on June 9, 1895, and priest on December 27, 1896. From 1896 until 1898, he was curate at St. James Church, Philadelphia. In 1898–1899, and 1900–1903, he was with the City Mission in Philadelphia. He then served churches in Southwark, Pennsylvania; Boston, Massachusetts; and Newport, Rhode Island. From 1907 until 1930, Lowrie was rector of St Paul's American Church in Rome.

When he retired in 1930, he returned to Princeton and began what he called an "itinerant ministry." He published 39 books and numerous articles, including The Short Story of Jesus (1943) and Kierkegaard (1938). A Complete Bibliography of Walter Lowrie was compiled by Donald M. Fox, and published in 1979. From his retirement in 1930 until his death, Lowrie studied and translated the works of Søren Kierkegaard, the Danish nineteenth-century theologian. From 1939 until 1945, he published twelve volumes of Kierkegaard translations and worked very closely with fellow Kierkegaard translator David F. Swenson, who was working from the University of Minnesota. The Rev. Walter Lowrie was awarded the Knight Cross of the Order of Dannebrog on July 25, 1947 with the following motivation: "As an appreciation of his extensive efforts to spread the knowledge of the intellectual production of Søren Kierkegaard in the Anglo-Saxon world and, thereby, promoting the general understanding of Danish spiritual life." During his retirement, he traveled and lectured throughout the world. Lowrie died in Princeton, and his wife, Barbara Armour, left his home, now known as the Walter Lowrie House, to the university.
