= Allan Menzies =

Allan Menzies (23 January 1845 – 8 May 1916) was a Scottish minister remembered as a religious author and translator. He was fluent in English and German.

== Life ==
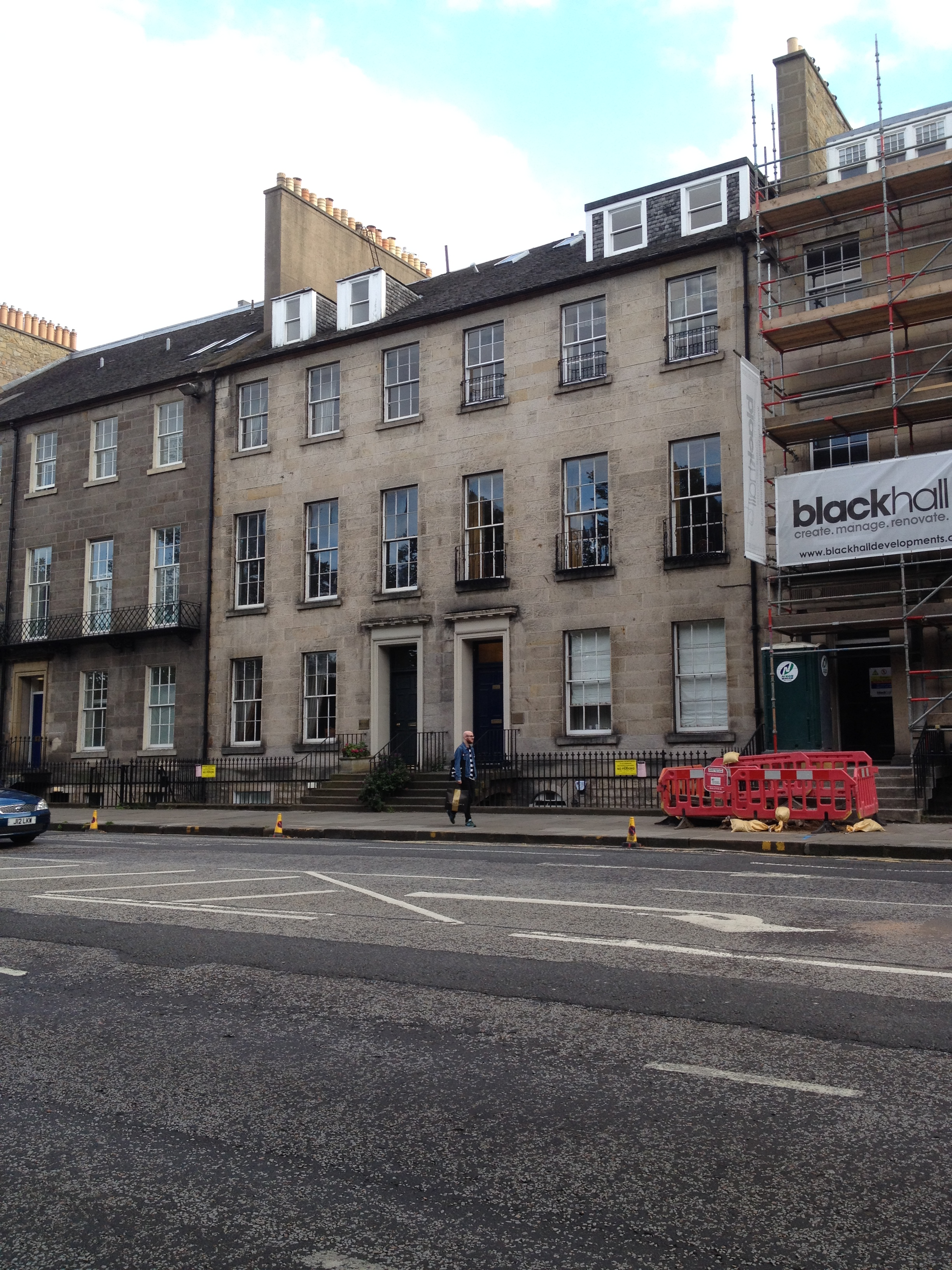
32 and 33 Queen Street in Edinburgh

Menzies was born on 23 January 1845 in Edinburgh the third son of Helen (née Cowan) (1806-1875), grand-daughter of Alexander Cowan and Allan Menzies (1805-1856), Professor of Conveyancing at the University of Edinburgh. The family lived in a luxurious Georgian townhouse at 32 Queen Street.

He was educated at Edinburgh Academy and Stuttgart Gymnasium in Germany. He then took a general degree at the University of St Andrewsgraduating with an MA in 1865. He then studied Divinity at the University of Edinburgh gaining a BD in 1869. He befriended Andrew Lang at St Andrews.

He was licensed by the Presbytery of the Church of Scotland in Dunoon in 1870. He then became a town missionary in the city centre of Glasgow before becoming second charge at Athelstaneford, moving to Carluke in 1872. In May 1873 he was ordained at Abernyte west of Dundee.

In 1889 he was awarded a doctorate (DD) by the University of Glasgow. Queen Victoria suggested him as Professor of Biblical Criticism of the University of St Andrews in 1899. He held the position until his death.

He left St Andrews around 1914/15 possibly due to his known German sympathies.

He died at Innellan on 8 May 1916. He is buried in the churchyard at St Andrews Cathedral.

== Family ==
In July 1878 he married Mary Elizabeth Honey (1841-1916), daughter of Rev John Adamson Honey of Inchture.

They had two daughters: Helen Margaret Menzies (1879-1947); Frederica Lucy Anne Menzies (an author).

His brother Sir William John Menzies (1834-1905) was a lawyer and financier.

== Publications ==
- The Apostle Paul (translation of Baur's work) (1876)
- The First Three Centuries of the Christian Church (1878)
- Services for Sunday Schools (1879)
- The Successors of the Great Physician (1880)
- The Christian Priesthood (1880)
- Pfleiderer;s Philosophy of Religion (1881)
- Wellhausen's Prolegomena to the History of Israel (1885)
- National Religion (1888)
- A Critical Study of the New Testament (1890)
- The History of Religion (1895 revised 1911)
- The Earliest Gospel (1901)
- The Religions of India: Brahmanism and Buddhism (1902)
- The Christ of the Fourth Gospel (1909)
- The Second Epistle to the Corinthians (1912)
- A Study of Calvin and Other Papers (1918)

=== Periodicals ===
- The Anti-Nicene Church Fathers (1897)
- Review of Theology and Philosophy (1905 to 1915)
- The Dictionary of the Bible (major contributor)
- Hasting's Encyclopaedia of Religion and Ethics
- Mind
