= Philosophical Fragments =

1844 Philosophical text by Søren Kierkegaard

Philosophical Fragments, or a Fragment of Philosophy
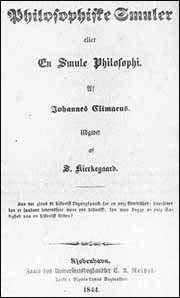
- Title page of the original Danish edition
- Author: Søren Kierkegaard
- Original title: Philosophiske Smuler eller En Smule Philosophi
- Language: Danish
- Series: First authorship (Pseudonymous)
- Genre: Philosophy
- Publication date: June 13, 1844
- Publication place: Denmark
- English publication date: 1936 - First Translation
- Pages: ~200
- Followed by: Concluding Unscientific Postscript to Philosophical Fragments

Philosophical Fragments (Danish title: Philosophiske Smuler eller En Smule Philosophi) is a philosophical work written by Danish philosopher Søren Kierkegaard in 1844 and the first of three works written under the pseudonym Johannes Climacus.

The question involves how knowledge can be known, and Climacus discusses how the theories of Socratic recollection and Christian divinity can inform the learner of truth. At the same time, it is an important early text in existentialist philosophy. Like many of his other works, it was not translated into German and English until several decades after Kierkegaard's death, but it then became a prominent work in philosophy.

Kierkegaard seeks to contrast the paradox of Christianity with the Socratic theory of recollection. Socratic wisdom, for Kierkegaard, means "every human being is himself the midpoint, and the whole world focuses only on him because his self knowledge is God-knowledge."

Although this work has been published under the name "Philosophical Fragments," there is debate on whether this is the most appropriate translation of the title. Kierkegaard scholar and translator Walter Lowrie prefers "Philosophical Scraps," and a new translation of the work by M. G. Piety is instead titled "Philosophical Crumbs".
