= Either/Or (Kierkegaard book) =

First published work of Søren Kierkegaard (1843)

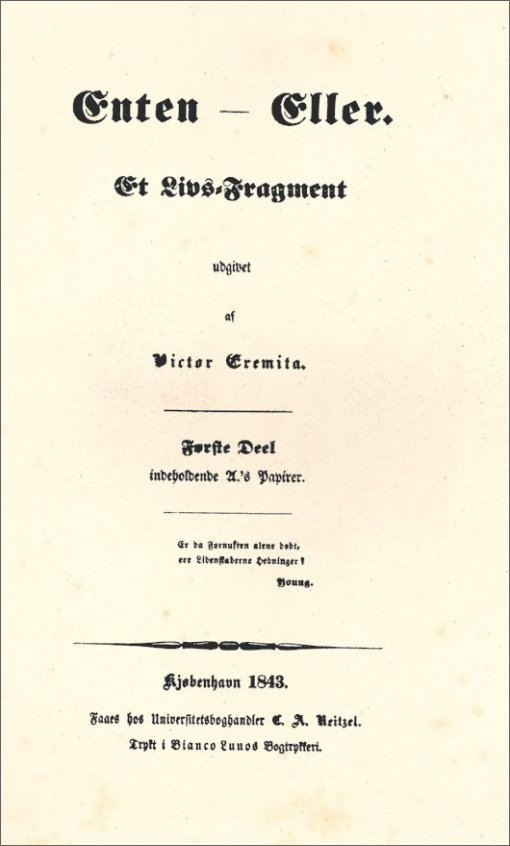
- Title page of the original Danish edition from 1843
- Author: Søren Kierkegaard
- Original title: Enten – Eller
- Language: Danish
- Genre: Philosophy
- Published: February 20, 1843 University bookshop Reitzel, Copenhagen
- Followed by: Two Upbuilding Discourses, 1843

Either/Or (Danish: Enten – Eller) is the first published work of Danish philosopher Søren Kierkegaard. It appeared in two volumes in 1843 under the pseudonymous editorship of Victor Eremita (Latin for "victorious hermit"). It outlines a theory of human existence, marked by the distinction between an essentially hedonistic, aesthetic mode of life and the ethical life, which is predicated upon commitment.

Either/Or portrays two life views. Each life view is written and represented by a fictional author, with the prose reflecting and depending on the life view. The aesthetic life view is written in short essay form, with poetic imagery and allusions, discussing aesthetic topics such as music, seduction, drama, and beauty. The ethical life view is written as two long letters, with a more argumentative and restrained prose, discussing moral responsibility, critical reflection, and marriage. The views are expressed as experiences embodied by the fictional authors. The book's central concern is Aristotle's primal question, "How should we live?" His motto comes from Plutarch, "The deceived is wiser than one not deceived."

The aesthetic is the personal, subjective realm of existence, where an individual lives and extracts pleasure from life for its own sake. This realm offers the possibility of the highest and lowest experiences. The ethical, on the other hand, is the civic realm of existence, where value and identity are judged and at times superseded by the objective world. The choice is whether to remain oblivious to the outside world or to become involved. More specifically, the ethical realm starts with a conscious effort to choose one's life. Either way it is possible to go too far in one direction and lose sight of the self. Only faith can rescue the individual from these two opposing realms. Either/Or concludes with a brief sermon hinting at the religious sphere of existence, which consumed most of Kierkegaard's publishing career. Ultimately, his challenge is for the reader to "discover a second face hidden behind the one you see" internally, and then in others.

== Historical context ==
After writing and defending his dissertation On the Concept of Irony with Continual Reference to Socrates (1841), Kierkegaard left Copenhagen in October 1841 to spend the winter in Berlin. His main purpose was to attend lectures by German philosopher Friedrich Wilhelm Joseph Schelling, an eminent figure at the time. The lectures disappointed many in Schelling's audience, including Mikhail Bakunin and Friedrich Engels, while Kierkegaard described it as "unbearable nonsense". During his stay, Kierkegaard worked on the manuscript for Either/Or, took daily lessons to perfect his German, and attended operas and plays, particularly by Mozart and Goethe. He returned to Copenhagen in March 1842 with a draft of the manuscript, which he completed late that year and published in February 1843.

According to a journal entry from 1846, Either/Or was written "lock, stock, and barrel in eleven months" ("Rub og Stub, i 11 Maaneder"), although a page from the "Diapsalmata" section in the "A" volume was written earlier.

The title Either/Or affirmed Aristotelian logic, particularly as modified by Johann Gottlieb Fichte and Immanuel Kant. Is the question, "Who am I?" a scientific question or one for the individual to answer?

Kierkegaard argues that Hegel's philosophy dehumanized life by denying personal freedom and choice through the neutralization of the "either/or". The dialectic structure of becoming renders existence far too easy, in Hegel's theory, because conflicts are eventually mediated and disappear through a natural process that requires no individual choice other than a submission to the Will of the Idea or Geist. Kierkegaard saw this as a denial of selfhood and instead advocated the importance of personal responsibility and choice.

== Structure ==
The book is the first of Kierkegaard's works written pseudonymously, a practice he employed during the first half of his career. In this case, he employed four pseudonyms:

- "Victor Eremita" - the fictional compiler and editor, which he claims to have found in an antique escritoire.
- "A" - the fictional author of the first text ("Part I") by Victor Eremita, whose real name he claims not to have known.
- "B" "Judge Vilhelm" (or "Wilhelm" - "William") - the fictional author of the second text ("Part II").
- "Johannes" - the fictional author of a section of "Part I" titled "The Diary of a Seducer" and Cordelia his lover.

== Publication ==
Kierkegaard published the second edition of Either/Or on May 14, 1849, the same day he published The Lily of the Field and the Bird of the Air: Three Devotional Discourses. He published three books on the same day October 16, 1843.

== Part I ==
The first part describes the "aesthetic" phase of existence. It contains a collection of papers, notionally found by "Victor Eremita" and written by "A", the aesthete.

The aesthete, according to Kierkegaard, eventually falls into despair, a psychological state (explored further in Kierkegaard's The Concept of Anxiety and The Sickness Unto Death) that results from a recognition of the limits of the aesthetic approach to life. Kierkegaard's "despair" is a somewhat analogous precursor of existential angst. The natural reaction is to make an eventual leap to the second phase, the ethical, which is characterized by rational choice and commitment that replace the capricious and inconsistent longings of the aesthetic mode.

=== Diapsalmata ===
The first section of Part I is a collection of tangential aphorisms, epigrams, anecdotes, and musings on the aesthetic mode. The word "diapsalmata" is related to "psalms", and means "refrains". It contains some of Kierkegaard's best-known and poetic lines, such as "What is a poet?", "Freedom of Speech" vs. "Freedom of Thought", the "Unmovable chess piece", the tragic clown, and the laughter of the gods.

Reading these as written shows a constant movement from the outer poetic experience to the inner experience of humor. The movement from the outer to the inner is a theme in Kierkegaard's works.

=== Immediate Stages of the Erotic, or Musical Erotic ===
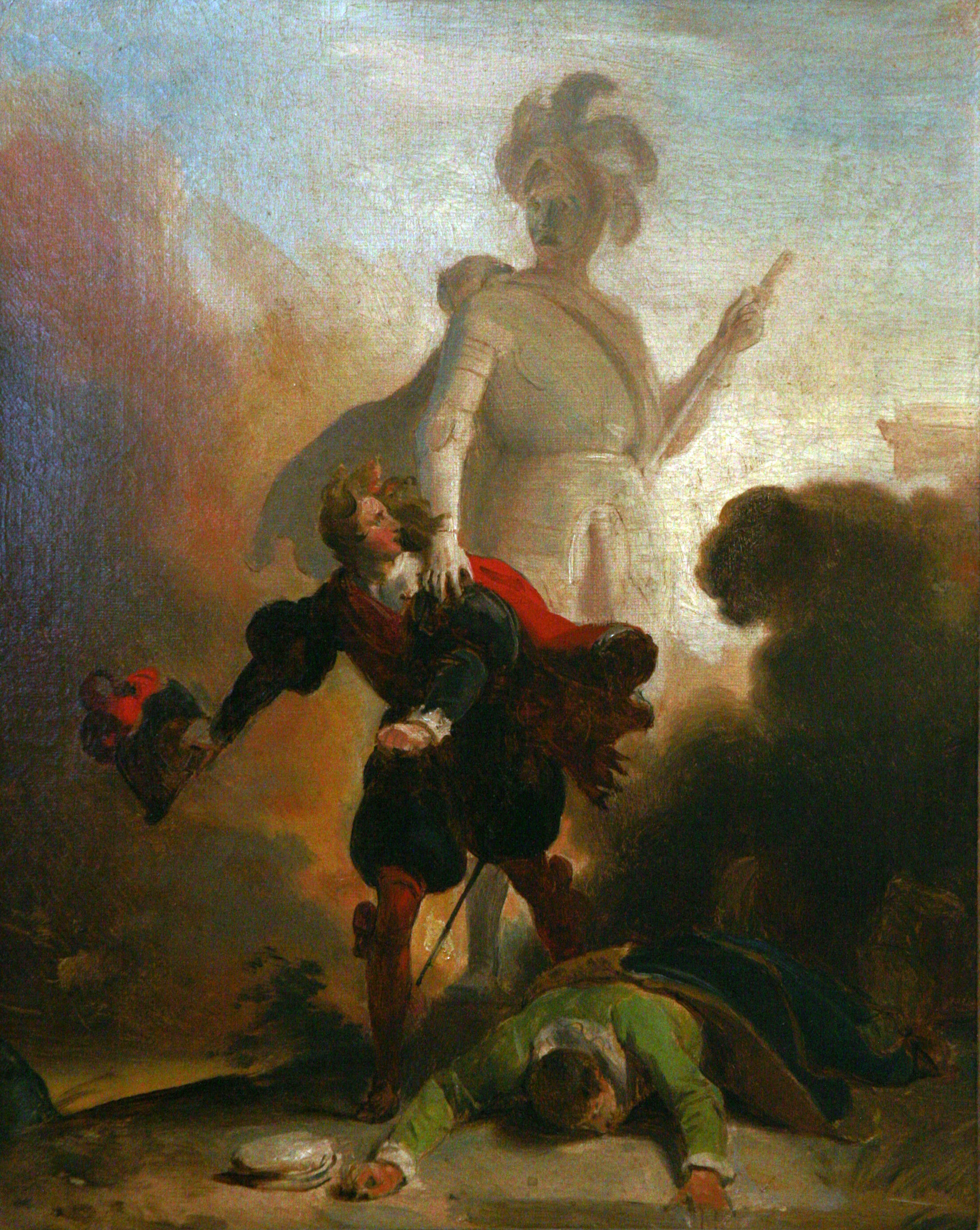
Don Giovanni confronts the stone guest in a painting by Alexandre-Évariste Fragonard, ca 1830–35 (Musée des Beaux-Arts de Strasbourg)

This essay discusses the idea that music expresses sensuality. "A" evaluates Mozart's The Marriage of Figaro, The Magic Flute and Don Giovanni, as well as Goethe's Faust. "A" accepts the task of proving, through the works of Mozart, that "music is a higher, or more spiritual art, than language". During this process, he offers three stages of the musical-erotic.

He distinguishes a seducer such as Don Juan, who falls under aesthetic categories, and Faust, who falls under ethical categories. "The musical Don Juan enjoys the satisfaction of desire; the reflective Don Juan enjoys the deception, enjoys the cunning." Don Juan is split between the aesthetic and the ethical. He becomes lost in the multiplicity of the "1,003 women he has to seduce" (as in the famous aria "Madamina, il catalogo è questo"), Faust seduces just one woman.

This section deals with theological questions. "A" asks if God seduces 1,003 people at one time or if he seduces one individual at a time in order to make a believer. He writes:

Achim v. Arnim tells somewhere of a seducer of a very different style, a seducer who falls under ethical categories. About him he uses an expression which in truth, boldness, and conciseness is almost equal to Mozart’s stroke of the bow. He says he could so talk with a woman that, if the devil caught him, he could wheedle himself out of it if he had a chance to talk with the devil’s grandmother. This is the real seducer; the aesthetic interest here is also different, namely: how, the method.

=== Essays read before the Symparanekromenoi ===
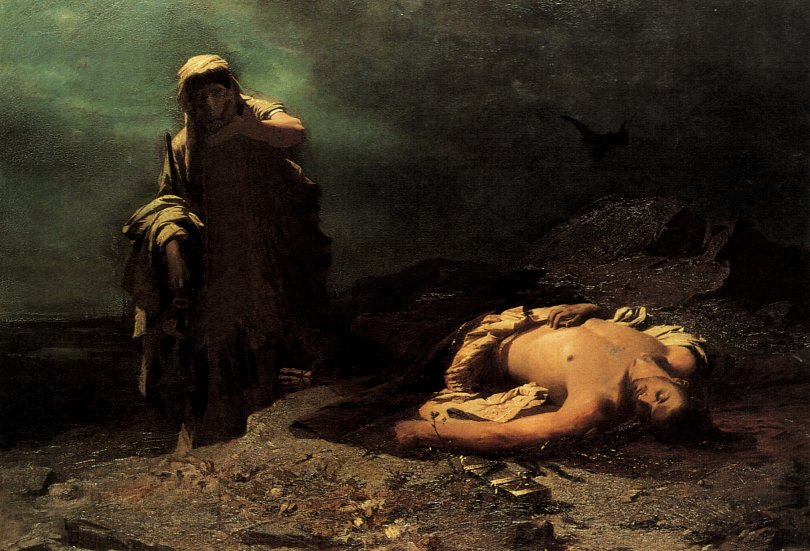
Antigone in front of the dead Polynices, painting by Nikiphoros Lytras (1865), National Gallery, Athens, Greece.

The next three sections are essay lectures from "A" to the "symparanekromenoi", a club or fellowship of the dead who practice the art of writing posthumous papers.

The first essay, which discusses ancient and modern tragedy, is the "Ancient Tragical Motif as Reflected in the Modern". He writes about tragedy's inner and outer aspects. Can remorse be shown on a stage? What about sorrow and pain? Which is easier to portray? He also discusses guilt, sin, fear, compassion, and responsibility in what can be considered a foreshadowing of Fear and Trembling and Repetition. He then writes a modern interpretation of Antigone that presages The Concept of Anxiety.

The second essay, "Shadowgraphs: A Psychological Pastime", discusses modern heroines, including Mozart's Elvira and Goethe's Gretchen (Margaret). He studies how desire can come to grief. He asks whether love can be deceived.

He is asking whether one person can reveal the inner life of a historical figure. Psychologically he is asking whether psychologists can give an accurate account of the inner world. Religiously he's asking whether one person can accurately perceive the inner world of another. He conducts several thought experiments to attempt this.

The third essay, called "The Unhappiest One", discusses the hypothetical question: "who deserves the distinction of being unhappier than everyone else?" Kierkegaard has expanded his search for the highest to a search for the lowest. He wants to find the unhappy person by looking to the past. Is it Niobe, Job, the father of the prodigal son, or Periander, Abraham or Christ?

Ultimately, for Kierkegaard, the aesthetical and the ethical are both superseded by a final phase which he terms the "religious" mode. This is introduced later in Fear and Trembling.

=== The First Love ===
In this volume, Kierkegaard examines the concept of "First Love" as a pinnacle for the aesthete, using his concepts of "closedness" (indesluttethed in Danish) and "demonic" (demoniske) with reference to Eugène Scribe. Scribe wanted to create a template for all playwrights. He insisted that people value plays to escape reality and not for instruction. Kierkegaard rejected any template in the field of literature or of Christianity. He was against systematizing literature, because the system forces the artist to settle down within the system.

He wrote about the muse as the occasion for inspiration. He considers how much of the muse's calling depends on the muse, how much on the individual, and how much on will/volition. Later in Concluding Unscientific Poscript he wrote; "inspiration is indeed an object of faith, is qualitatively dialectical, not attainable by means of quantification."

Kierkegaard attacks reading about love instead of discovering love. Scribe's play is 16 pages long leading Kierkegaard to write a 50-page review. He attacked the practice of reading reviews instead of the subject books.

He attends a performance and sees his lover at a play called First Love; for him this is a sign, like a four-leaf clover, that she must be the one. Confusion sets in for her because of mistaken identity. She is unable to make up her mind about love and says, "The first love is the true love, and one loves only once." Kierkegaard rejects this as sophistry, "because the category first, is at the same time a qualitative and a numerical category."

=== Crop Rotation: An Attempt at a Theory of Social Prudence ===
To Kierkegaard's aesthete, boredom is the root of all evil, and must be avoided. In this section, "A" explains that, just as a farmer rotates crops to keep the soil fertile, so must a man continue to change in order to remain interesting. "A" speaks out against anything that may prevent this rotation and lock one into boredom, including friends, family, and most importantly for the second half of the book, marriage.

Boredom rests upon the nothing that interlaces existence; its dizziness is infinite, like that which comes from looking into a bottomless abyss. Soren Kierkegaard, Either/Or Part 1 Rotation of Crops 1843 Hong p. 291

=== Diary of a Seducer ===
Written by "Johannes the Seducer", this volume illustrates how the aesthete holds the "interesting" as his highest value and that to satisfy his voyeuristic reflections, he manipulates the girl Cordelia into becoming interesting – he seduces her, but then schemes to have her question the idea of engagement. Finally, Johannes succeeds in having Cordelia break the engagement. He uses irony, artifice, caprice, imagination and arbitrariness to engineer poetically satisfying possibilities; he is not so much interested in the act of seduction as in willfully creating its interesting possibility.

The Seducer is reminiscent of Faust Part 1, Scene VII (A Street). Faust says to Mephistopheles, "Listen, you must get that girl for me!" Mephistopheles says she's an "innocent" girl, but Faust says she's "older than 14". Mephistopheles says he's "speaking like some Don Juan". Faust then calls the devil a Master Moraliser. But Goethe may have been responding to Christopher Marlowe's The Tragical History of Doctor Faustus (1616); Goethe and Marlowe have devils and angels as third person or persons between him and his love, but Kierkegaard has a different third person involved in the discussions between Johannes the Seducer and Cordelia. He has this power called chance. The Seducer knows the value of chance and wants to use chance to be "a possibility which seems an impossibility".

Kierkegaard had this seducer speak again in Stages on Life's Way, where he explored possibilities and then once more where he tried to explain that misunderstanding can be the root of the unity of the tragic and the comic:

Anyone who, when he is twenty years old, does not understand that there is a categorical imperative—Enjoy—is a fool, and anyone who does not start doing it is a Christiansfelder. .... Our young friend will always remain on the outside. Victor is a fanatic; Constantin has paid too much for his intellect; the Fashion Designer is a madman. All four of you after the same girl will turn out to be a fizzle! Have enough fanaticism to idealize, enough appetite to join in the jolly conviviality of desire, enough understanding to break off in exactly the same way death breaks off, enough rage to want to enjoy it all over again—then one is the favorite of the gods and of the girls."

Kierkegaard explores the category of choice and the aesthetic as well as the ethical. Both can choose to love each other but the "how" of love is Kierkegaard's subject.

== Part II ==
The second part represents the ethical stage. Eremita found a group of letters from a retired Judge Vilhelm or William (in Danish: "Assessor Wilhelm"), another pseudonymous author, to "A", trying to convince "A" of the value of the ethical life by arguing that the ethical person can still appreciate aesthetic values. The difference is that the pursuit of pleasure is tempered with ethical values and responsibilities. Letters:

- "The Aesthetic Validity of Marriage": This letter is about the aesthetic value of marriage and defends marriage as a way of life.
- "Equilibrium between the Aesthetic and the Ethical in the Development of Personality" concerns the subject of choosing the good, or one's self, and of the value of making binding life-choices.
- "Ultimatum": The volume ends in a discourse on the Thought that, against God everyone is always wrong. His spiritual advice for "A" and "B" is that they make peace with each other. Kierkegaard quotes from: the Gospel of Luke 19:42 NIV "and said, "If you, even you, had only known on this day what would bring you peace --but now it is hidden from your eyes." Sennacherib's prism 2 Kings 19:35 "That night the angel of the LORD went out and put to death a hundred and eighty-five thousand men in the Assyrian camp When the people got up the next morning -- there were all the dead bodies!" to the end for this discourse.

It is human nature to look to external forces when faced with obstacles, but the ethicist is against this. Comparison is an esthetic exercise and has nothing to do with ethics and religion. He says, "Let each one learn what he can; both of us can learn that a person’s unhappiness never lies in his lack of control over external conditions, since this would only make him completely unhappy." He also asks if a someone in love can know whether they are more in love than another. He advances this thought in Concluding Unscientific Postscript and expands on looking inward in Practice in Christianity.

The ethical and the ethical-religious have nothing to do with the comparative. ... All comparison delays, and that is why mediocrity likes it so much and, if possible, traps everyone in it by its despicable friendship among mediocrities. A person who blames others, that they have corrupted him, is talking nonsense and only informs against himself. p. 549-550

Comparison is the most disastrous association that love can enter into; comparison is the most dangerous acquaintance love can make; comparison is the worst of all seductions. Søren Kierkegaard, Works of Love (1847), Hong, p. 186

Lord Jesus Christ, our foolish minds are weak; they are more than willing to be drawn-and there is so much that wants to draw us to itself. There is pleasure with its seductive power, the multiplicity with its bewildering distractions, the moment with its infatuating importance and the conceited laboriousness of busyness and the careless time-wasting of light-mindedness and the gloomy brooding of heavy-mindedness-all this will draw us away from ourselves to itself in order to deceive us. But you, who are the truth, only you, Savior and Redeemer, can truly draw a person to yourself, which you have promised to do-that you will draw all to yourself. Then may God grant that by repenting we may come to ourselves, so that you, according to your Word, can draw us to yourself-from on high, but through lowliness and abasement. Søren Kierkegaard, Practice in Christianity, 1850 p.157 Hong

It is unclear if Kierkegaard acknowledges an ethical stage without religion. Freedom seems to denote freedom to choose the will to do the right and to denounce the wrong in a secular, almost Kantian style. However, remorse (angeren) seems to be a religious category specifically related to the Christian concept of deliverance. Moreover, Kierkegaard is constant in his point of view that each individual can become conscious of a higher self and embrace the spiritual self in an "eternal understanding".

== Discourses and sequel ==
Along with this work, Kierkegaard published, under his own name, Two Upbuilding Discourses on May 16, 1843, intended to complement Either/Or, "The Expectancy of Faith" and "Every Good and Every Perfect Gift is from Above".

Kierkegaard also published another discourse during the printing of the second edition of Either/Or in 1849. This discourse has to do with the difference between wishing and willing in the development of a particular expectancy. "As thought becomes more absorbed in the future, it loses its way in its restless attempt to force or entice an explanation from the riddle." Expectancy always looks to the future and can hope, but regret, which is what Goethe did in The Sorrows of Young Werther, closes the door of hope and love becomes unhappy. Kierkegaard points to "faith as the highest" expectancy because faith is something everyone has, or can have. He says: "The person who wishes it for another person wishes it for himself; the person who wishes it for himself wishes it for every other human being, because that by which another person has faith is not that by which he is different from him but is that by which he is like him; that by which he possesses it is not that by which he is different from others but that by which he is altogether like all."

The characters in Either/Or believe everyone is alike in that everyone has talent or everyone has the conditions that would allow them to live an ethical life. Goethe wanted to love and complained that he couldn't be loved, but everyone else could be. But he wished, he didn't have an expectancy to work his will to love. Kierkegaard responds to him:

You know that you must not wish - and thereupon he went further. When his soul became anxious, he called to it and said: When you are anxious, it is because you are wishing; anxiety is a form of wishing, and you know that you must not wish - then he went further. When he was close to despair, when he said: I cannot; everyone else can - only I cannot. Oh, that I had never heard those words, that with my grief I had been allowed to go my way undisturbed - and with my wish. Then he called to his soul and said: Now you are being crafty, for you say that you are wishing and pretend that it is a question of something external that one can wish, whereas you know that it is something internal that one can only will; you are deluding yourself, for you say: Everyone else can - only I cannot. And yet you know that that by which others are able is that by which they are altogether like you-so if it really were true that you cannot, then neither could the others. So you betray not only your own cause but, insofar as it lies with you, the cause of all people; and in your humbly shutting yourself out from their number, you are slyly destroying their power. Then he went further. After he had been slowly and for a long time brought up under the disciplinarian in this way, he perhaps would have arrived at faith. Søren Kierkegaard, Two Upbuilding Discourses, 1843 p. 9-12

The "Ultimatum" at the end of the second volume of Either/Or hinted at a future discussion of the religious stage in The Two Upbuilding Discourses, "Ask yourself and keep on asking until you find the answer, for one may have known something many times, acknowledged it; one may have willed something many times, attempted it-and yet, only the deep inner motion, only the heart’s indescribable emotion, only that will convince you that what you have acknowledged belongs to you, that no power can take it from you-for only the truth that builds up is truth for you." This discussion is included in Stages on Life's Way (1845). The first two sections revisit and refine the aesthetic and ethical stages elucidated in Either/Or, while the third section, Guilty/Not Guilty is about the religious stage and refers specifically to Goethe's other book, The Autobiography of Goethe: Truth and Poetry, from My Own Life vol 1, 2

In addition to the discourses, one week after Either/Or was published, Kierkegaard published a newspaper article in Fædrelandet, titled "Who Is the Author Of Either/Or?", attempting to create authorial distance from the work, emphasizing the content of the work and the embodiment of a particular way of life in each of the pseudonyms. Kierkegaard, using the pseudonym "A.F.", writes, "most people, including the author of this article, think it is not worth the trouble to be concerned about who the author is. They are happy not to know his identity, for then they have only the book to deal with, without being bothered or distracted by his personality."

== Themes ==
The various essays in Either/Or help clarify the various forms of aestheticism and ethical existence. Both A and Judge Vilhelm attempt to focus primarily upon the best that their mode of existence has to offer.

A fundamental characteristic of the aesthete is immediacy. In Either/Or, there are several levels of immediacy explored, ranging from unrefined to refined. Unrefined immediacy is characterized by immediate cravings for desire and satisfaction through enjoyments that do not require effort or personal cultivation (e.g. alcohol, drugs, casual sex, sloth, etc.) Refined immediacy is characterized by planning how best to enjoy life aesthetically. The "theory" of social prudence given in Crop Rotation is an example of refined immediacy. Instead of mindless hedonistic tendencies, enjoyments are contemplated and "cultivated" for maximum pleasure. However, both the refined and unrefined aesthetes still accept the fundamental given conditions of their life, and do not accept the responsibility to change it. If things go wrong, the aesthete simply blames existence, rather than one's self, assuming some unavoidable tragic consequence of human existence and thus claims life is meaningless. Kierkegaard spoke of immediacy this way in his sequel to Either/Or, Stages on Life's Way.

Commitment is an important characteristic of the ethicist. Commitments are made by being an active participant in society, rather than a detached observer or outsider. The ethicist has a strong sense of responsibility, duty, honor and respect for his friendships, family, and career. Judge Vilhelm uses the example of marriage as an example of an ethical institution requiring strong commitment and responsibility. Whereas the aesthete would be bored by the repetitive nature of marriage (e.g. married to one person only), the ethicist believes in the necessity of self-denial (e.g. self-denying unmitigated pleasure) in order to uphold one's obligations.

Kierkegaard stresses the "eternal" nature of marriage and says "something new comes into existence" through the wedding ceremony. The aesthete doesn't see it that way. The aesthete makes a "half hour’s resolution" but the ethical person, and especially the religious person, makes the "good resolution". Someone devoted to pleasure finds it impossible to make this kind of resolution. The ethical and "Christian religious" person make the resolution because they have the will to have a true conception of life and of oneself." A resolution involves change but for the single individual this involves only change in oneself. It never means changing the whole world or even changing the other person.

== Interpretation ==
The extremely nested pseudonymity of this work adds a problem of interpretation. A and B are the authors of the work, Eremita is the editor. Kierkegaard's role in all this appears to be that he deliberately sought to disconnect himself from the points of view expressed in his works, although the absurdity of his pseudonyms" bizarre Latin names proves that he did not hope to thoroughly conceal his identity from the reader. Kierkegaard's Papers first edition VIII(2), B 81 - 89 explain this method in writing. He discussed Either/Or in first and second edition in his 1848, 1859 book The Point of View of My Work as an Author.

In my career as an author, a point has now been reached where it is permissible to do what I feel a strong impulse to do and so regard as my duty—namely, to explain once for all, as directly and frankly as possible, what is what: what I as an author declare myself to be. The moment (however unpropitious it may be in another sense) is now appropriate; partly because (as I have said) this point has been reached, and partly because I am about to encounter for the second time in the literary field my first production. Either/Or, in its second edition, which I was not willing to have published earlier. Point of View, Lowrie translation 1962 p. 5

Furthermore, Kierkegaard was a close reader of the aesthetic works of Johann Wolfgang von Goethe and the ethical works of Georg Wilhelm Friedrich Hegel. Each presented a way of living one's life in a different manner. Kierkegaard's writings in this book are close to what Goethe wrote in his Autobiography.

=== Existential interpretation ===
A common interpretation of Either/Or presents the reader with a choice between two approaches to life. There are no standards or guidelines which indicate how to choose. The reasons for choosing an ethical way of life over the aesthetic only make sense if one is already committed to an ethical way of life. Suggesting the aesthetic approach as evil implies one has already accepted the idea that there is a good/evil distinction to be made. Likewise, choosing an aesthetic way of life only appeals to the aesthete, ruling Judge Vilhelm's ethics as inconsequential and preferring the pleasures of seduction. Thus, existentialists see Victor Eremita as presenting a radical choice in which no pre-ordained value can be discerned. One must choose, and through one's choices, one creates what one is.

However, the aesthetic and the ethical ways of life are not the only ways of living. Kierkegaard continues to flesh out other stages in further works, and the Stages on Life's Way is considered a direct sequel to Either/Or. It is not the same as Either/Or as he points out in Concluding Postscript in 1846.

=== Christian interpretation ===
The whole book can be viewed as the struggle individuals go through as they attempt to find meaning in their lives. Victor Eremita bought a secretary (desk), which was something external, and said, "a new period of your life must begin with the acquisition of the secretary". "A" desires the absolute highest. He can find no meaning in his life until he begins to study. He writes letters for the dead like the historians do. He's trying to find God by studying the past as Hegel did. Don Juan seduces him away from God and Faust robs him of his innocent faith through the power of language. For him, tautology is the highest realm of thought. He's someone who is in complete "conflict with his environment" because he is relating himself to externals.

"B" argues with "A". He says ethics are the highest. "A" wants to remain a mystery to himself but "B" says it's the meaning of life to become open to yourself. It's more important to know yourself than historical persons. The more you know about yourself the more you can find your eternal validity. God will bless the most ethical person. Each one knows what's best for the other but neither knows what's best for himself.

Kierkegaard, speaking in the voice of the upbuilding discourse at the end, says they are both wrong. They're both trying to find God in a childish way. Whatever they relate to in an external way will never make them happy or give them meaning. Art, science, dogma, and ethics constantly change. We all want to be in the right and never in the wrong. Once we find what we desire we find that it wasn't what we imagined it to be. So Kierkegaard says to leave it all to God.

A recent way to interpret Either/Or is to read it as an applied Kantian text. Scholars for this interpretation include Alasdair MacIntyre and Ronald M. Green. In After Virtue, MacIntyre claims Kierkegaard is continuing the Enlightenment project set forward by Hume and Kant. Green notes several points of contact with Kant in Either/Or:

However, other scholars think Kierkegaard adopts Kantian themes in order to criticize them, while yet others think that although Kierkegaard adopts some Kantian themes, their final ethical positions are substantially different. George Stack argues for this latter interpretation, writing, "Despite the occasional echoes of Kantian sentiments in Kierkegaard's writings (especially in Either/Or), the bifurcation between his ethics of self-becoming and Kant's formalistic, meta-empirical ethics is, mutatis mutandis, complete ... Since radical individuation, specificity, inwardness, and the development of subjectivity are central to Kierkegaard's existential ethics, it is clear, essentially, that the spirit and intention of his practical ethics is divorced from the formalism of Kant."

=== Biographical interpretation ===
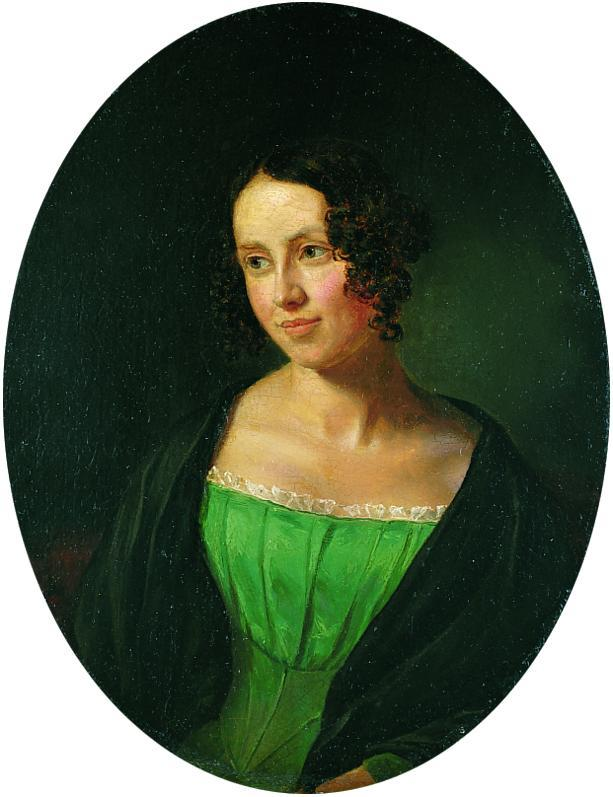
Regine Olsen, a muse for Kierkegaard's writings (painting by Emil Bærentzen)

From a purely literary and historical point of view, Either/Or can be seen as a thinly veiled autobiography of the events between Kierkegaard and his ex-fiancée Regine Olsen. Johannes the Seducer in The Diary of a Seducer treats the object of his affection, Cordelia, much as Kierkegaard treats Regine: befriending her family, asking her to marry him, and breaking off the engagement. Either/Or, then, could be the poetic and literary expression of Kierkegaard's decision between a life of sensual pleasure, as he had experienced in his youth, or a possibility of marriage and what social responsibilities marriage might or ought to entail. Ultimately however, Either/Or stands philosophically independent of its relation to Kierkegaard's life.

Yet, Kierkegaard was concerned about Regine because she tended to assume the life view of characters she saw in the plays of Shakespeare at the theater. One day she would be "Beatrice in Much Ado about Nothing" and another Juliet.

== Reception ==
=== Early reception ===
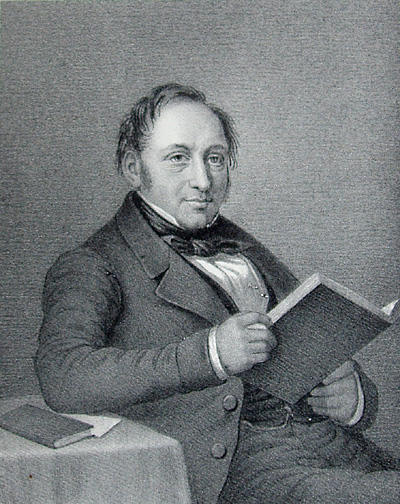
Johan Ludvig Heiberg (1791–1860)

Either/Or established Kierkegaard's reputation as a respected author. Henriette Wulff, in a letter to Hans Christian Andersen, wrote, "Recently a book was published here with the title Either/Or! It is supposed to be quite strange, the first part full of Don Juanism, skepticism, et cetera, and the second part toned down and conciliating, ending with a sermon that is said to be quite excellent. The whole book attracted much attention. It has not yet been discussed publicly by anyone, but it surely will be. It is actually supposed to be by a Kierkegaard who has adopted a pseudonym...."

Johan Ludvig Heiberg, a prominent Hegelian, at first criticized the aesthetic section, Either (Part I), then he had much better things to say about Or, Part II. Julia Watkin said "Kierkegaard replied to Heiberg in The Fatherland as Victor Eremita, blaming Heiberg for not reading the preface to Either/Or which would have given him the key to the work." Kierkegaard later used his book Prefaces to publicly respond to Heiberg and Hegelianism. Kierkegaard also published a short article, Who is the Author of Either/Or?, a week after the publication of Either/Or itself.

In 1886, Georg Brandes compared Either/Or with Frederik Paludan-Müller's Kalanus in Eminent Authors of the Nineteenth Century, which was translated into English at that time. Later, in 1906, he compared Kierkegaard's Diary of the Seducer with Rousseau's Julie, or the New Heloise and with Goethe's Sorrows of Young Werther. He also compared Either/Or to Henrik Ibsen's Brand but Edmund Gosse disagreed with him.

Kierkegaard later referred to his concept of choosing yourself as the single individual in The Concept of Anxiety, June 17, 1844, and then in his Four Upbuilding Discourses, August 31, 1844, and once again in Upbuilding Discourses in Various Spirits, 1847. William James echoed Kierkegaard in his lecture on The Sick Soul where he wrote, "the man must die to an unreal life before he can be born into the real life."

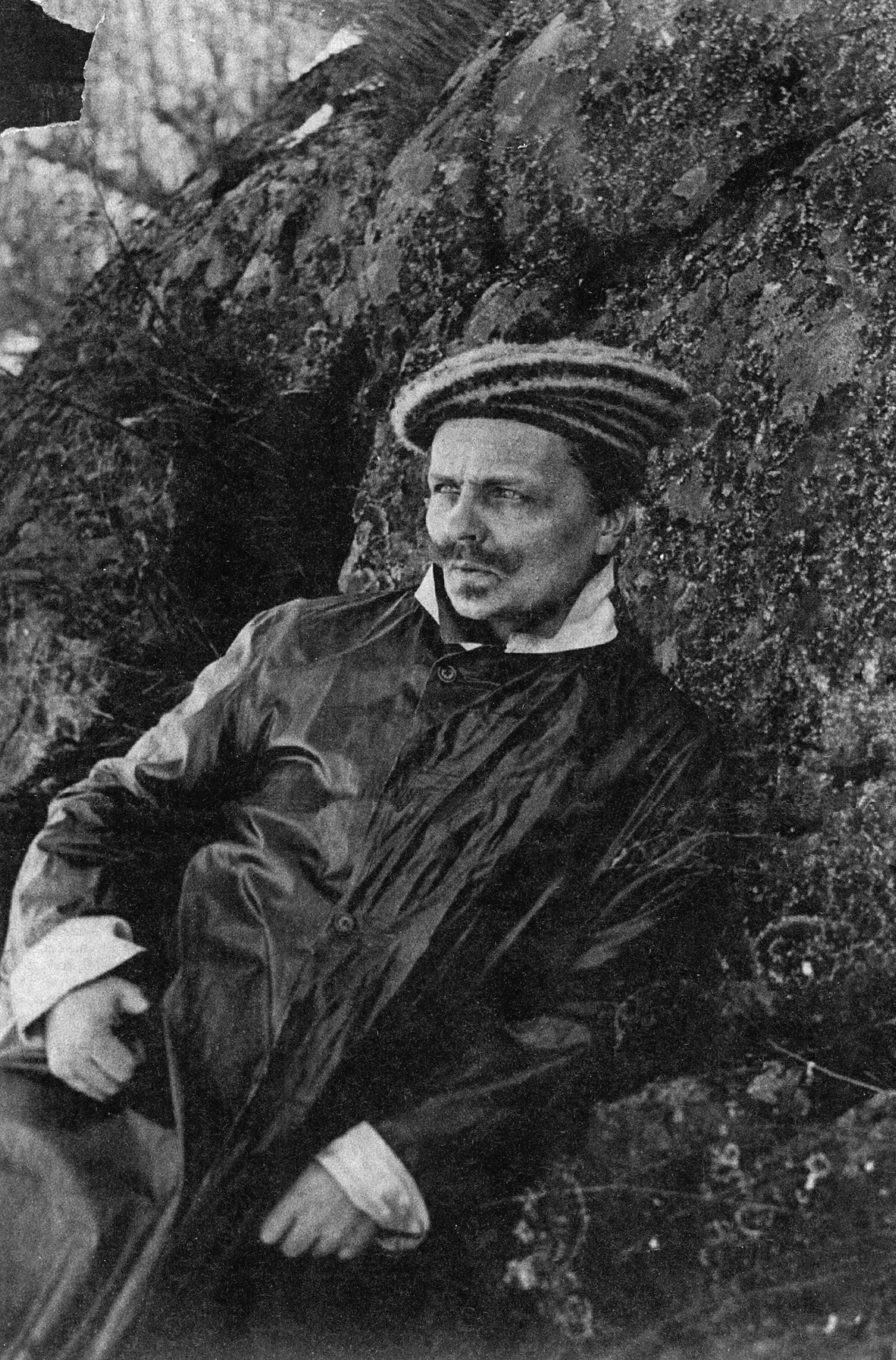
August Strindberg (1849–1910)

August Strindberg was familiar with Either/Or and this book made him "forever a champion of the ethical as juxtaposed to the aesthetic life conception and he always remained faithful to the idea that art and knowledge must be subservient to life, and that life itself must be lived as we know best, chiefly because we are part of it and cannot escape from its promptings." Strindberg was obviously attracted to Either/Or Part II where Kierkegaard developed his categorical imperative. He wrote the following in Growth of a Soul published posthumously in 1913 about Kierkegaard's Either—Or: "it was valid only for the priests who called themselves Christians and the seducer and Don Juan were the author himself, who satisfied his desires in imagination". Part II was his "Discourse on Life as a Duty, and when he reached the end of the work he found the moral philosopher in despair, and that all this teaching about duty had only produced a Philistine." He then states that Kierkegaard's discourses might have led him closer to Christianity but he didn't know if he could come back to something "which had been torn out, and joyfully thrown into the fire". However, after reading the book he "felt sinful".

Kierkegaard put an end to his own double-mindedness about devoting himself completely to aesthetics or developing a balance between the aesthetic and the ethical and going on to an ethical/Christian religious existence in the first part of his authorship (1843-1846) and then described what he had learned about himself and about being a Christian beginning with Upbuilding Discourses in Various Spirits (1847). He learned to choose his own Either/Or.

each man who is mindful of himself knows what no science knows, since he knows who he himself is. Søren Kierkegaard, The Concept of Anxiety 1844, Nichol p. 78-79

=== Later reception ===
Although Either/Or, published in 1843, was Kierkegaard's first major book, it was one of his last books to be translated into English, as late as 1944. Frederick DeW. Bolman Jr. insisted that reviewers consider the book in this way: "In general, we have a right to discover, if we can, the meaning of a work as comprehensive as Either/Or, considering it upon its own merits and not reducing the meaning so as to fit into the author's later perspective. It occurred to me that this was a service to understanding Kierkegaard, whose esthetic and ethical insights have been much slighted by those enamored of his religion of renunciation and transcendence. ... Kierkegaard's brilliance seems to me to be showing that while goodness, truth, and beauty can not speculatively be derived one from another, yet these three are integrally related in the dynamics of a healthy character structure".

David F. Swenson, a professor at the University of Minnesota, introduced three lectures about Kierkegaard in 1918 in which he "presented Soren Kierkegaard’s delineation of three fundamental modes of life: First, the Life of Enjoyment – Folly and Cleverness in the Pursuit of Pleasure; second, the Life of Duty – Realizing the Self through Victorious Accomplishments; third, the Life of Faith – The Religious Transformation of the Self through Suffering.

Miguel de Unamuno published his 1914 novel Mist in response to his reading of Kierkegaard's Diary of a Seducer.

Thomas Henry Croxall was impressed by "A"'s thoughts on music in the essay, "The Immediate Stages of the Erotic, or Musical Erotic". Croxall argues that "the essay should be taken seriously by a musician because it makes one think, and think hard enough to straighten many of one's ideas; ideas, I mean, not only on art, but on life" and goes on to discuss the psychological, existential, and musical value of the work.

Reinhold Niebuhr questioned Kierkegaard's emphasis in his pastoral epistle at the end of Or. He wrote the following in 1949.

The tendency of modern culture to see only the creative possibilities of human freedom makes the Christian estimate of the human situation seem morbid by contrast. Is not Kierkegaard morbid, even Christians are inclined to ask, when he insists that "before God man is always in the wrong"? Does such an emphasis not obscure the creative aspects of human freedom? Is it not true that men are able by increasing freedom to envisage a larger world and to assume a responsible attitude toward a wider and wider circle of claims upon their conscience? Does the Christian faith do justice, for instance, to the fact that increasing freedom has set the commandment, "Thou shalt love thy neighbor as thyself," in a larger frame of reference than ever before in history? Is it not significant that we have reached a global situation in which we may destroy ourselves and each other if we fail to organize a new global "neighborhood" into a tenable brotherhood?

Johannes Edouard Hohlenberg wrote a biography about Søren Kierkegaard in 1954 and in that book he speculated that the Diary of the Seducer was meant to depict the life of P.L. Moller who later (1845) wrote the articles in The Corsair detrimental to the character of Kierkegaard. The Diary of a Seducer by itself, is a provocative novella, and has been reproduced separately from Either/Or several times. John Updike said of the Diary, "In the vast literature of love, The Seducer's Diary is an intricate curiosity – a feverishly intellectual attempt to reconstruct an erotic failure as a pedagogic success, a wound masked as a boast".

Many authors were interested in separating the esthetic, the ethical and the religious but it may have been, as far as Kierkegaard was concerned, of more importance for the single individual to have a way to decide when one was becoming dominant over the other two. Henrik Stangerup, (1937–1998) a Danish writer, wrote three books as a way to illustrate Kierkegaard's three stages of existence, 1981, The Road to Lagoa Santa, which was about Kierkegaard's brother-in-law Peter Wilhelm Lund (the ethicist), 1985 The Seducer: It Is Hard to Die in Dieppe, Peder Ludvig Moller was the esthetic in that novel, and in 1991 Brother Jacob which describes Søren Kierkegaard as a Franciscan friar.

In contemporary times, Either/Or received new life as a grand philosophical work with the publication of Alasdair MacIntyre's After Virtue (1981), where MacIntyre situates Either/Or as an attempt to capture the Enlightenment spirit set forth by David Hume and Immanuel Kant. After Virtue renewed Either/Or as an important ethical text in the Kantian vein, as mentioned previously. Although MacIntyre accuses Victor Eremita of failing to provide a criterion for one to adopt an ethical way of life, many scholars have since replied to MacIntyre's accusation in Kierkegaard After MacIntyre.

=== In popular culture ===
The 1997 Elliott Smith album Either/Or derives its name from Either/Or, reflecting Smith's interest in philosophy, which he studied at Hampshire College in Massachusetts. The novel Either/Or by Elif Batuman is named after Kierkegaard's Either/Or, and the main character reflects on the themes of Kierkegaard's work within the book.
