= Mordaunt Roger Barnard =

British translator (1828–1906)

Mordaunt Roger Barnard, Rev. (22 December 1828 – 2 July 1906) was a Church of England clergyman and translator of works from Scandinavian languages. He was the eldest son of Mordaunt Barnard, Rector of Preston Bagot, a rural dean and JP for Essex. He was born in Thornton-In-Craven, Yorkshire.

== Biography ==
He was educated at Charterhouse and Rugby schools and at Christ's College, Cambridge, graduating BA in 1851. He was ordained as a deacon in Rochester in 1851 and as a priest in 1852. He served as British Chaplain in Oslo from 1858 until 1862 and as a vicar in the village of Margaretting in Essex from 1863 until 1906. He was a member of the Chelmsford Board of Guardians for nearly 30 years. He translated the first English edition of Valdemar Adolph Thisted's novel Letters from Hell. He also translated The Odyssey into English blank verse.

== Selected translations by Mordaunt Roger Barnard ==
- Frederik Christian Schubeler, Synopsis of the vegetable products of Norway, 1862
- Anna Magdalene Thorensen, Signe’s history: A Norwegian tale, 1865
- The life of Thorvaldsen: Collated from the Danish of Just Matthias Thiele, 1865 (Digitised )
- M. Rowel (pseud. Valdemar Adolph Thisted), Letters from Hell, 1866
- Carl Wilhelm Paijkull, A summer in Iceland, 1868
- The private life of the old Northmen, translated from the posthumous works of Jacob Rudolph Keyser, 1868 (Digitised 0
- The Odyssey, rendered into English blank verse, 1876
- August Theodor Blanche, Flickan i stadsgården, Master of His fate: A Swedish tale, 1885
- Jacob Breda Bull, Fridtjof Nansen: A book for the young, 1898

== Works by Mordaunt Roger Barnard ==
- Sport in Norway, and where to find it. Together with a short account of the vegetable productions of the country, etc, 1864
- Sketches of life, scenery, and sport in Norway, 1871
