= Stages on Life's Way =

1845 philosophical work by Søren Kierkegaard

- First edition, titlepage.
- Author: Søren Kierkegaard
- Original title: Stadier paa Livets Vei
- Translator: Walter Lowrie, 1940; Howard V. Hong, 1988
- Language: Danish
- Series: First authorship (Pseudonymous)
- Genre: Christianity, philosophy
- Publisher: Bianco Luno Press
- Publication date: April 30, 1845
- Publication place: Denmark
- English publication date: 1940 – first translation
- Media type: Paperback
- Pages: 465
- ISBN: 0691020493
- Preceded by: Three Discourses on Imagined Occasions
- Followed by: Concluding Unscientific Postscript

Stages on Life's Way (Danish: Stadier på Livets Vej; historical orthography: Stadier paa Livets Vej) is a philosophical work by Søren Kierkegaard written in 1845. The book was written as a continuation of Kierkegaard's prior work Either/Or. While Either/Or is about the aesthetic and ethical realms, Stages considers the religious. Kierkegaard's "concern was to present the various stages of existence in one work if possible". Kierkegaard was influenced by both Christian Wolff and Immanuel Kant to the point of using the structure and philosophical content of the three special metaphysics as the scheme or blueprint for building the ideas for this book.

David F. Swenson cited this book when discussing Kierkegaard's melancholy, which was corroborated by Kierkegaard's older brother Peter Kierkegaard, though he could have been writing about Jonathan Swift.

== Criticism ==
Georg Brandes is credited with introducing Kierkegaard to the reading public with his 1879 biography about him; he also wrote an analysis of the works of Henrik Ibsen and Bjørnstjerne Bjørnson in which he made many comparisons between their works and Kierkegaard's. He considered Stages on Life's Way in relation to Either/Or and the works of Ibsen:

I wonder whether Henrick Ibsen did not feel a little uncomfortable, when Letters from Hell, (by Valdemar Adolph Thisted), seized the opportunity, and sailed forth in the wake of Brand? They both stand in direct relation to the thinker, who, here in Scandinavia, has had the greatest share in the intellectual education of the younger generation, namely, Søren Kierkegaard. Love's Comedy, although its tendency is in the opposite direction, finds its point of departure in what Kierkegaard, in Either-Or and Stages on the Path of Life, has said for and against marriage. And yet the connection in this case is very much slighter than in the case of Brand. Almost every cardinal idea in this poem is to be found in Kierkegaard, and its hero’s life has its prototype in his. Ibsen shares with Kierkegaard the conviction that in every human being there slumbers a mighty soul, an unconquerable power, but he differs from Kierkegaard in holding this essence of individuality to be human, while Kierkegaard looks upon it as something supernatural.

— Henrik Ibsen. Björnstjerne Björnson. Critical studies (1899), by Georg Brandes, 20-21, 61-62, 99

Julia Watkin says the bulk of Stages was composed between September 1844 and March 1845. And that Quidam's diary is the counterpart of the seducer's diary.

Walter Lowrie notes that Kierkegaard wrote a "repetition of Either/Or" because it stopped with the ethical.

In 1988 Mary Elizabeth Moore discusses Kierkegaard's method of indirect communication in this book.
