= Philosophy of Søren Kierkegaard =

Ideas of 19th-century Danish philosopher

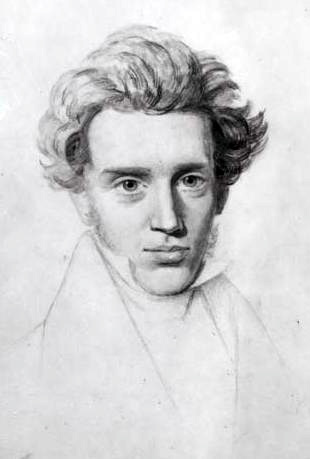
Søren Kierkegaard

Søren Kierkegaard's philosophy has been a major influence in the development of 20th century philosophy, especially Existentialism and Postmodernism. Kierkegaard was a 19th century Danish philosopher who has been called the "Father of Existentialism". His philosophy also influenced the development of existential psychology.

Kierkegaard criticized aspects of the philosophical systems that were brought on by philosophers such as Georg Wilhelm Friedrich Hegel before him and the Danish Hegelians. He was also indirectly influenced by the philosophy of Immanuel Kant. He measured himself against the model of philosophy which he found in Socrates, which aims to draw one's attention not to explanatory systems, but rather to the issue of how one exists.

One of Kierkegaard's recurrent themes is the importance of subjectivity, which has to do with the way people relate themselves to (objective) truths. In Concluding Unscientific Postscript to Philosophical Fragments, he argues that "subjectivity is truth" and "truth is subjectivity." What he means by this is that most essentially, truth is not just a matter of discovering objective facts. While objective facts are important, there is a second and more crucial element of truth, which involves how one relates oneself to those matters of fact. Since how one acts is, from the ethical perspective, more important than any matter of fact, truth is to be found in subjectivity rather than objectivity.

== Note on pseudonyms ==
Many of Kierkegaard's earlier works from 1843–1846 were written pseudonymously. In the non-pseudonymous The Point of View of My Work as an Author, he explained that the pseudonymous works are written from perspectives which are not his own: while Kierkegaard himself was a religious author, the pseudonymous authors wrote from points of view that were aesthetic or speculative. One exception to this is "Anti-Climacus", a pseudonymous author developed after the writing of The Point of View. Anti-Climacus is a religious author who writes from a Christian perspective so ideal that Kierkegaard did not wish it to be attributed to himself.

Because the pseudonymous authors write from perspectives which are not Kierkegaard's own, some of the philosophy mentioned in this article may or may not necessarily reflect Kierkegaard's own beliefs. Just as other philosophers bring up viewpoints in their essays to discuss and criticize them, Kierkegaard assigns pseudonyms to explore a particular viewpoint in-depth, which may take up a whole book or two in some instances, and Kierkegaard, or another pseudonym, critiques that position. For example, the author, Johannes Climacus is not a Christian and he argues from a non-Christian viewpoint. Anti-Climacus, as mentioned earlier, is a Christian to a high degree and he argues from a devout Christian viewpoint. Kierkegaard places his beliefs in-between these two authors.

Most of Kierkegaard's later philosophical and religious writings from 1846–1855 were written and authored by himself, and he assigned no pseudonyms to these works. Subsequently, these works are considered by most scholars to reflect Kierkegaard's own beliefs. Where appropriate, this article will mention the respective author, pseudonymous or not.

== Themes in his philosophy ==
=== Alienation ===
Alienation is a term applied to a wide variety of phenomena including: any feeling of separation from, and discontent with, society; feeling that there is a moral breakdown in society; feelings of powerlessness in the face of the solidity of social institutions; the impersonal, dehumanised nature of large-scale and bureaucratic social organisations. Kierkegaard recognizes and accepts the notion of alienation, although he phrases it and understands it in his own distinctly original terms. For Kierkegaard, the present age is a reflective age—one that values objectivity and thought over action, lip-service to ideals rather than action, discussion over action, publicity and advertising to reality, and fantasy to the real world. For Kierkegaard, the meaning of values has been removed from life, by lack of finding any true and legitimate authority. Instead of falling into any claimed authority, any "literal" sacred book or any other great and lasting voice, self-aware humans must confront an existential uncertainty.

Humanity has lost meaning because the accepted criterion of reality and truth is ambiguous and subjective thought—that which cannot be proved with logic, historical research, or scientific analysis. Humans cannot think our choices in life, we must live them; and even those choices that we often think about become different once life itself enters into the picture. For Kierkegaard, the type of objectivity that a scientist or historian might use misses the point—humans are not motivated and do not find meaning in life through pure objectivity; instead, they find it through passion, desire, and moral and religious commitment. These phenomena are not objectively provable—nor do they come about through any form of analysis of the external world; they come about through inward reflection, a way of looking at one's life that evades objective scrutiny.

Kierkegaard's analysis of the present age uses terms that resemble but are not exactly coincident with Hegel and Marx's theory of alienation.

=== Abstraction ===
An element of Kierkegaard's critique of modernity in his socio-political work, Two Ages, is the mention of money — which he calls an abstraction. An abstraction is something that only has a reality in an ersatz reality. It is not tangible, and only has meaning within an artificial context, which ultimately serves devious and deceptive purposes. It is a figment of thought that has no concrete reality, neither now nor in the future.

How is money an abstraction? Money gives the illusion that it has a direct relationship to the work that is done. That is, the work one does is worth so much, equals so much money. In reality, however, the work one does is an expression of who one is as a person; it expresses one's goals in life and associated meaning. As a person, the work one performs is supposed to be an external realization of one's relationship to others and to the world. It is one's way of making the world a better place for oneself and for others. What reducing work to a monetary value does is to replace the concrete reality of one's everyday struggles with the world —to give it shape, form and meaning— with an abstraction. Kierkegaard lamented that "a young man today would scarcely envy another his capacities or skill or the love of a beautiful girl or his fame, no, but he would envy him his money. Give me money, the young man will say, and I will be all right."

=== Death ===
Death is inevitable and temporally unpredictable. Kierkegaard believed that individuals needed to sincerely and intensely come to realize the truth of that fact in order to live passionately. Kierkegaard accuses society of being in death-denial. Even though people see death all around them and grasp as an objective fact that everyone dies, few people truly understand, subjectively and inwardly, that they will die someday. For example, in Concluding Unscientific Postscript, Kierkegaard notes that people never think to say, "I shall certainly attend your party, but I must make an exception for the contingency that a roof tile happens to blow down and kill me; for in that case, I cannot attend."

=== Dread or anxiety ===
For Kierkegaard's author, Vigilius Haufniensis, anxiety/dread/angst (depending on the translation and context) is unfocused fear. Haufniensis uses the example of a man standing on the edge of a tall building or cliff. When the man looks over the edge, he experiences a focused fear of falling, but at the same time, the man feels a terrifying impulse to throw himself intentionally off the edge. That experience is anxiety because of our complete freedom to choose to either throw oneself off or to stay put. The mere fact that one has the possibility and freedom to do something, even the most terrifying of possibilities, triggers immense feelings of dread. Haufniensis called this our "dizziness of freedom."

In The Concept of Anxiety, Haufniensis focuses on the first anxiety experienced by man: Adam's choice to eat from God's forbidden tree of knowledge or not. Since the concepts of good and evil did not come into existence before Adam ate the fruit, which is now dubbed original sin, Adam had no concept of good and evil, and did not know that eating from the tree was evil. What he did know was that God told him not to eat from the tree. The anxiety comes from the fact that God's prohibition itself implies that Adam is free and that he could choose to obey God or not. After Adam ate from the tree, sin was born. So, according to Kierkegaard, anxiety precedes sin, and it is anxiety that leads Adam to sin. Haufniensis mentions that anxiety is the presupposition for hereditary sin.

However, Haufniensis mentions that anxiety is a way for humanity to be saved as well. Anxiety informs us of our choices, our self-awareness and personal responsibility, and brings us from a state of un-self-conscious immediacy to self-conscious reflection. (Jean-Paul Sartre calls these terms pre-reflexive consciousness and reflexive consciousness.) An individual becomes truly aware of their potential through the experience of dread. So, anxiety may be a possibility for sin, but anxiety can also be a recognition or realization of one's true identity and freedoms.

Whoever has learned to be anxious in the right way has learned the ultimate.

— Vigilius Haufniensis, The Concept of Anxiety

=== Despair ===
Is despair an excellence or a defect? Purely dialectically, it is both. The possibility of this sickness is man's superiority over the animal, for it indicates infinite sublimity that he is spirit. Consequently, to be able to despair is an infinite advantage, and yet to be in despair is not only the worst misfortune and misery—no, it is ruination.

— Anti-Climacus, The Sickness Unto Death

Most emphatically in The Sickness Unto Death, Kierkegaard's author argues that the human self is a composition of various aspects that must be brought into conscious balance: the finite, the infinite, a consciousness of the "relationship of the two to itself," and a consciousness of "the power that posited" the self. The finite (limitations such as those imposed by one's body or one's concrete circumstances) and the infinite (those capacities that free us from limitations such as imagination) always exist in a state of tension. That tension between two aspects of the "self" that must be brought into balance. When the self is out of balance, i.e., has the wrong understanding of who it is because it conceives itself too much in terms of its own limiting circumstances (and thus fails to recognize its own freedom to determine what it will be) or too much in terms of what it would like to be, (thus ignoring its own circumstances), the person is in a state of despair. Notably, Anti-Climacus says one can be in despair even if one feels perfectly happy. Despair is not just an emotion, in a deeper sense it is the loss of self, i.e., it describes the state when one has the wrong conception of oneself. In Either/Or, A and Judge William each has one epistolary novel in two volumes. The A is an aesthete well aware that he can use the power of interpretation to define who he is and what he takes to be valuable. He knows he can shape and reshape his own self identity. Nothing binds him to his relationships. Nothing binds him to his past actions. In the end though, he also knows he lacks a consistent understanding of who he is. He lacks a self that resists his own power of reinterpretation. His older friend Judge William, argues that a deeper concept of selfhood is discovered as one commits to one's actions, and takes ownership of the past and present. A concept of oneself, as this particular human being, begins to take form in one's own consciousness. Another perspective, one in which an individual can find some measure of freedom from despair, is available for the person with religious "faith." This attunes the individual so that he or she can recognize what has always been there: a self to be realized within the circumstances it finds itself right now, i.e., this inner attunement brings about a sort of synthesis between the infinite and the finite. In Fear and Trembling, Johannes de Silentio argues that the choice of Abraham to obey the private, unethical, commandment of God to sacrifice his son reveals what faith entails: he directs his consciousness absolutely toward "the absolute" rather than the merely ethical, i.e., he practices an inner spirituality that seeks to be "before god" rather than seeking to understand himself as an ethically upright person. His God requires more than being good, he demands that he seek out an inner commitment to him. If Abraham were to blithely obey, his actions would have no meaning. It is only when he acts with fear and trembling that he demonstrates a full awareness that murdering a son is absolutely wrong, ethically speaking.

Despair has several specific levels that a person can find themselves, each one further in despair than the last as laid out in The Sickness Unto Death.

The first level is "The despair that is ignorant of being despair or the despairing ignorance of having a self and an eternal self." Essentially this level is one which has the wrong conception of what a self is, i.e., is ignorant of how to realize the self one already potentially is. In this sense, the person does not recognize his own despair because he often measures the success of his life based on whether he himself judges himself to be happy. Regardless of whether you know you are in despair or not, Kierkegaard asserts, you can still be in that state. He notes that this is the most common in the world.

The next level of despair is "The despair that is conscious of being despair and therefore is conscious of having a self in which there is something eternal and then either in despair does not will to be itself or in despair wills to be itself." The first form of this conscious despair is "In despair not to will or want to be oneself." This becomes further subdivided into three categories: the one already mentioned, the despair not to will to be a self, and lowest, the despair to wish for a new self. These three divisions are mostly the self-worth the person has and the amount to which they understand their own despair. The despair to not be oneself is pretty straightforward. A person sees themself as unworthy and as such does not see themself as worthy before something they do not understand. The despair not to be a self is deeper, because to not wish to be a self is to wish to not have a relation to God or at the very least see one's relation to God as unworthy, and thus shrink from it. The lowest form of this group, however, is the desire to be a new self. This is logically the deepest form as it assumes the deepest understanding of one's despair. Once in despair, without a complete relation to God one will always be in despair, so to be in this level one understands the permanence of the despair. The despair in this group arises from the nature of sensate things and physical desires. These three sub groups are also grouped under the heading "Despair over the earthly."

The second level of conscious despair under the heading "Despair over the eternal." Someone in this level views themself in light of their own weakness. Unlike in the upper level, this weakness is understood and as such, instead of turning to faith and humbling oneself before God, they despair in their own weakness and unworthiness. In this sense, they despair over the eternal and refuse to be comforted by the light of God.

The last and lowest form of despair is the desire "In despair to will to be oneself." This last form of despair is also referred to by Kierkegaard as "demonic despair" (Note that the term demonic is used in the Classical Greek Sense, not the modern sense). In this form of despair, the individual finds him or herself in despair, understands they are in despair, seeks some way to alleviate it, and yet no help is forthcoming. As a result, the self becomes hardened against any form of help and "Even if God in heaven and all the angels offered him aid, he would not want it." At this level of despair the individual revels in their own despair and sees their own pain as lifting them up above the base nature of other humans who do not find themselves in this state. This is the least common form of despair and Kierkegaard claims it is mostly found in true poets. This despair can also be called the despair of defiance, as it is the despair that strikes out against all that is eternal. One last note is that as one travels further down the forms of despair, the number of people in each group becomes less and less.

=== Ethics ===
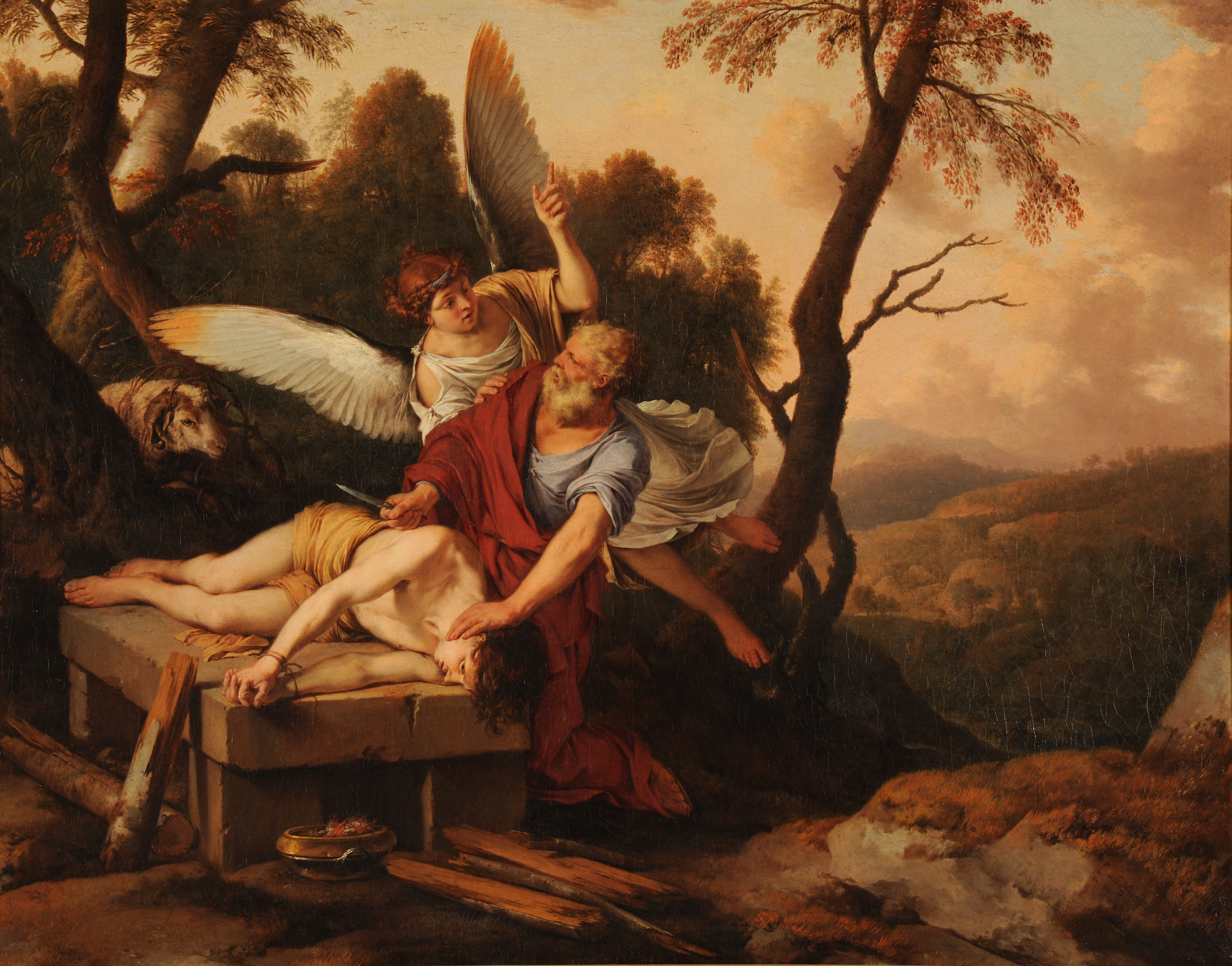
In Fear and Trembling, Johannes de Silentio analyzes Abraham's action to sacrifice Isaac. Silentio argues that Abraham is a knight of faith.

Many philosophers who initially read Kierkegaard, especially Johannes de Silentio's Fear and Trembling, often come to the conclusion that Kierkegaard supports a divine command law of ethics. The divine command theory is a metaethical theory which claims moral values are whatever is commanded by a god or gods. However, Kierkegaard (through his pseudonym Johannes de Silentio) is not arguing that morality is created by God; instead, he would argue that a divine command from God transcends ethics. This distinction means that God does not necessarily create human morality: it is up to us as individuals to create our own morals and values. But any religious person must be prepared for the event of a divine command from God that would take precedence over all moral and rational obligations. Kierkegaard called this event the teleological suspension of the ethical. Abraham, the knight of faith, chose to obey God unconditionally, and was rewarded with his son, his faith, and the title of Father of Faith. Abraham transcended ethics and leaped into faith.

But there is no valid logical argument one can make to claim that morality ought to be or can be suspended in any given circumstance, or ever. Thus, Silentio believes ethics and faith are separate stages of consciousness. The choice to obey God unconditionally is a true existential 'either/or' decision faced by the individual. Either one chooses to live in faith (the religious stage) or to live ethically (the ethical stage).

In Works of Love and Purity of Heart, Kierkegaard examines Christian ethics and the maxim, Love Thy Neighbour.

=== Individuality ===
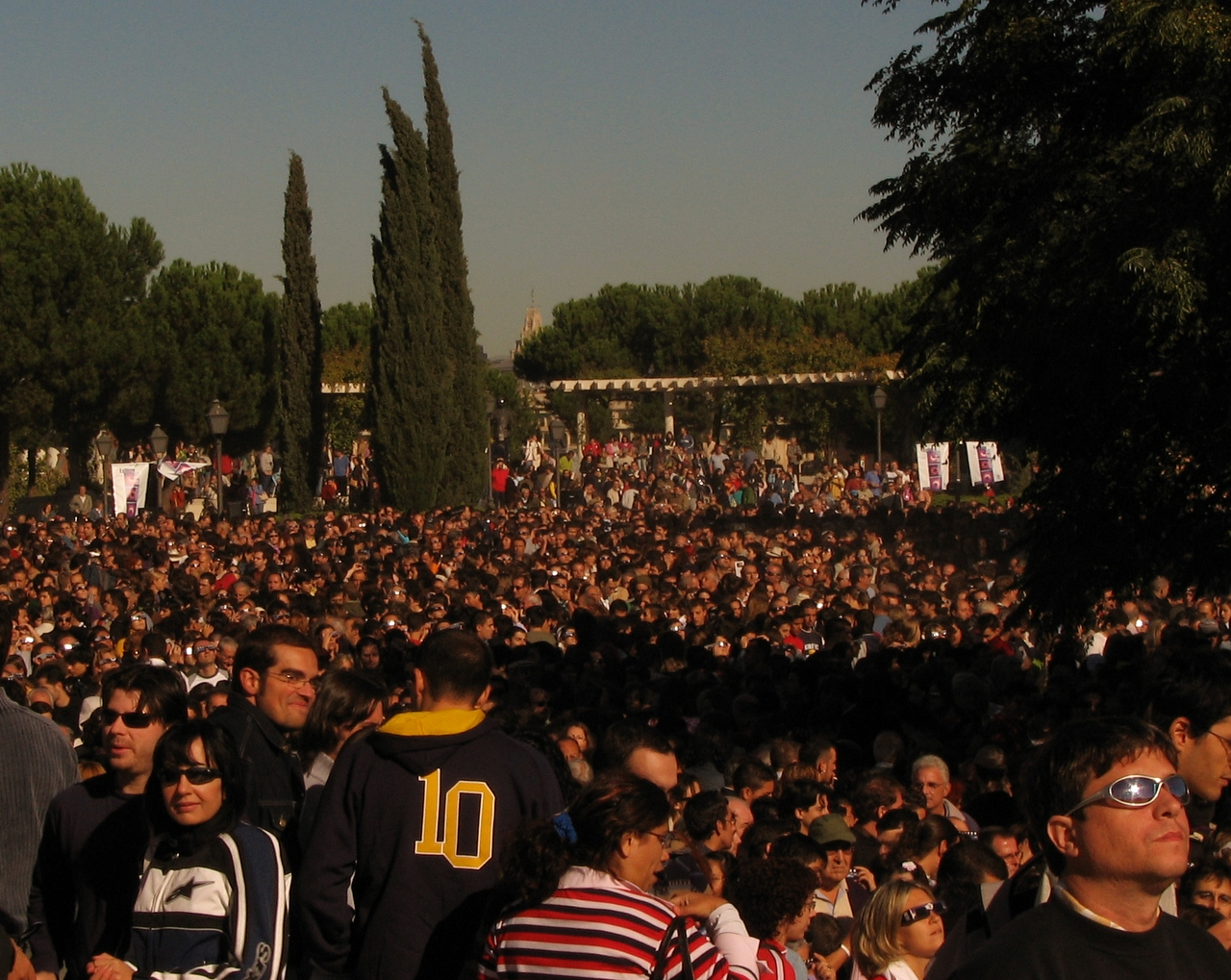
"In the public and the like, the individual is nothing, ... the numerical is constitutive ... the individual is nothing, and in the public he is not, in any profound sense, anything either". -Journals

For Kierkegaard, true individuality is called selfhood. Becoming aware of our true self is our true task and endeavor in life—it is an ethical imperative, as well as preparatory to a true religious understanding. Individuals can exist at a level that is less than true selfhood. We can live, for example, simply in terms of our pleasures—our immediate satisfaction of desires, propensities, or distractions. In this way, we glide through life without direction or purpose. To have a direction, we must have a purpose that defines for us the meaning of our lives.

In Sickness Unto Death specifically Kierkegaard deals with the self as a product of relations. In this sense, a human results from a relation between the Infinite (Noumena, spirit, eternal) and Finite (Phenomena, body, temporal). This does not create a true self, as a human can live without a "self" as he defines it. Instead, the Self or ability for the self to be created from a relation to the Absolute or God (the Self can only be realized through a relation to God) arises as a relation between the relation of the Finite and Infinite relating back to the human. This would be a positive relation.

An individual person, for Kierkegaard, is a particular that no abstract formula or definition can ever capture. Including the individual in "the public" (or "the crowd" or "the herd") or subsuming a human being as simply a member of a species is a reduction of the true meaning of life for individuals. What philosophy or politics try to do is to categorize and pigeonhole individuals by group characteristics instead of individual differences. For Kierkegaard, those differences are what make us who we are.

Kierkegaard's critique of the modern age, therefore, is about the loss of what it means to be an individual. Modern society contributes to this dissolution of what it means to be an individual. Through its production of the false idol of "the public", it diverts attention away from individuals to a mass public that loses itself in abstractions, communal dreams, and fantasies. It is helped in this task by the media and the mass production of products to keep it distracted.

Although Kierkegaard attacked "the public", he is supportive of communities:

In community, the individual is, crucial as the prior condition for forming a community. ... Every individual in the community guarantees the community; the public is a chimera, numerality is everything...

— Søren Kierkegaard, Journals

=== Pathos (passion) ===
For Kierkegaard, in order to apprehend the absolute, the mind must radically empty itself of objective content. What supports this radical emptying, however, is the desire for the absolute. Kierkegaard names this desire Passion.

According to Kierkegaard, the human self desires that which is beyond reason. Desire itself appears to be a desire for the infinite, as Plato once wrote. Even the desire to propagate, according to Plato, is a kind of desire for immortality—that is, we wish to live on in time through our children and their children. Erotic love itself appears as an example of this desire for something beyond the purely finite. It is a taste of what could be, if only it could continue beyond the boundaries of time and space. As the analogy implies, humans seek something beyond the here and now. The question remains, however, why is it that human pathos or passion is the most precious thing? In some ways, it might have to do with our status as existential beings. It is not thought that gets us through life—it is action; and what motivates and sustains action is passion, the desire to overcome hardships, pain, and suffering. It is also passion that enables us to die for ideals in the name of a higher reality. While a scientist might see this as plain emotion or simple animal desire, Kierkegaard sees it as that which binds to the source of life itself. The desire to live, and to live in the right way, for the right reasons, and with the right desires, is a holy and sacred force.

One can also look at this from the perspective of what the meaning of our existence is. Why suffer what humans have suffered, the pain and despair—what meaning can all of this have? For Kierkegaard, there is no meaning unless passion, the emotions and will of humans, has a divine source.

Passion is closely aligned with faith in Kierkegaard's thought. Faith as a passion is what drives humans to seek reality and truth in a transcendent world, even though everything we can know intellectually speaks against it. To live and die for a belief, to stake everything one has and is in the belief in something that has a higher meaning than anything in the world—this is belief and passion at their highest.

=== Subjectivity ===
Johannes Climacus, in Concluding Unscientific Postscript to Philosophical Fragments, writes the following cryptic line: "Subjectivity is Truth". To understand Climacus's concept of the individual, it is important to look at what he says regarding subjectivity. What is subjectivity? In very rough terms, subjectivity refers to what is personal to the individual—what makes the individual who he is in distinction from others. It is what is inside—what the individual can see, feel, think, imagine, dream, etc. It is often opposed to objectivity—that which is outside the individual, which the individual and others around can feel, see, measure, and think about. Another way to interpret subjectivity is the unique relationship between the subject and object.

Scientists and historians, for example, study the objective world, hoping to elicit the truth of nature—or perhaps the truth of history. In this way, they hope to predict how the future will unfold in accordance with these laws. In terms of history, by studying the past, the individual can perhaps elicit the laws that determine how events will unfold—in this way the individual can predict the future with more exactness and perhaps take control of events that in the past appeared to fall outside the control of humans.

In most respects, Climacus did not have problems with science or the scientific endeavor. He would not disregard the importance of objective knowledge. Where the scientist or historian finds certainty, however, Climacus noted very accurately that results in science change as the tools of observation change. But Climacus's special interest was in history. His most vehement attacks came against those who believed that they had understood history and its laws—and by doing so could ascertain what a human's true self is. That is, the assumption is that by studying history someone can come to know who he really is as a person. Kierkegaard especially accused Hegel's philosophy of falling prey to this assumption.

For Climacus, this is a ridiculous argument at best, and a harmful notion at worst. It undermines the meaning of what a self is. For Climacus, the individual comes to know who he is by an intensely personal and passionate pursuit of what will give meaning to his life. As an existing individual, who must come to terms with everyday life, overcome its obstacles and setbacks, who must live and die, the single individual has a life that no one else will ever live. In dealing with what life brings his way, the individual must encounter them with all his psycho-physical resources.

Subjectivity is that which the individual—and no one else—has. But what does it mean to have something like this? It cannot be understood in the same way as having a car or a bank account. It means to be someone who is becoming someone—it means being a person with a past, a present, and a future. No one can have an individual's past, present or future. Different people experience these in various ways—these experiences are unique, not anyone else's. Having a past, present, and future means that a person is an existing individual—that a person can find meaning in time and by existing. Individuals do not think themselves into existence, they are born. But once born and past a certain age, the individual begins to make choices in life; now those choices can be his, his parents', society's, etc. The important point is that to exist, the individual must make choices—the individual must decide what to do the next moment and on into the future. What the individual chooses and how he chooses will define who and what he is—to himself and to others.

The goal of life, according to Socrates, is to know thyself. Knowing oneself means being aware of who one is, what one can be and what one cannot be. The search, for this self, is the task of subjectivity. This task is the most important one in life. Climacus and Kierkegaard considers this to be an important task and should have been obvious to the individual immediately. If I do not know who I am, then I am living a lie.

Subjectivity comes with consciousness of myself as a self. It encompasses the emotional and intellectual resources that the individual is born with. Subjectivity is what the individual is as a human being. Now the problem of subjectivity is to decide how to choose—what rules or models is the individual going to use to make the right choices? What are the right choices? Who defines right? To be truly an individual, to be true to himself, his actions should in some way be expressed so that they describe who and what he is to himself and to others. The problem, according to Kierkegaard, is that we must choose who and what we will be based on subjective interests—the individual must make choices that will mean something to him as a reasoning, feeling being.

=== Three stages of life ===
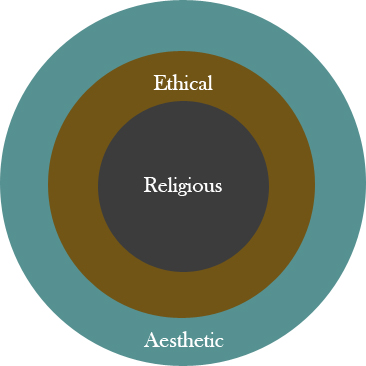
Three stages of life. (The circles' sizes are for illustrative purposes only.)

Early American Kierkegaard scholars tried to reduce the complexity of Kierkegaard's authorship by focusing on three levels of individual existence, which are named in passing by one of Kierkegaard's pseudonyms, Johannes Climacus, who wrote Concluding Unscientific Postscript. Though the stages represent only one way of interpreting Kierkegaard's thought, it has become a popular way of introducing his authorship among Anglo-American scholars. In continental European circles, stage theory never took hold in the same way. In one popular interpretation of stage theory, each of the so-called levels of existence envelops those below it: an ethical person is still capable of aesthetic enjoyment, for example, and a religious person is still capable of aesthetic enjoyment and ethical duty. The difference between these ways of living are internal, not external, and thus there are no external signs one can point to determine at what level a person is living.

==== Stage One: Aesthetic ====
Kierkegaard was interested in aesthetics, and is sometimes referred to as the "poet-philosopher" because of the passionate way in which he approached philosophy. But he is often said to be interested in showing the inadequacy of a life lived entirely in the aesthetic level. Aesthetic life is defined in numerous different ways in Kierkegaard's authorship, including a life defined by intellectual enjoyment, sensuous desire, and an inclination to interpret oneself as if one were "on stage." There are many degrees of this aesthetic existence and a single definition is thus difficult to offer. At bottom, one might see the purely unreflective lifestyle. At the top, we might find those lives which are lived in a reflective, independent, critical and socially apathetic way. But many interpreters of Kierkegaard believe that most people live in the least reflective sort of aesthetic stage, their lives and activities guided by everyday tasks and concerns. Fewer aesthetically-guided people are the reflective sort. Whether such people know it or not, their lives are said to be ones of complete despair. Kierkegaard's author A is an example of an individual living the aesthetic life.

==== Stage Two: Ethical ====
The second level of existence is the ethical. This is where an individual begins to take on a true direction in life, becoming aware of and personally responsible for good and evil and forming a commitment to oneself and others. One's actions at this level of existence have a consistency and coherence that they lacked in the previous sphere of existence. For many readers of Kierkegaard, the ethical is central. It calls each individual to take account of their lives and to scrutinize their actions in terms of absolute responsibility.

"Judge Wilhelm," a pseudonymous author of Either/Or and the voice who defines the ethical consciousness, argues that the commitment to take responsibility for one's own choices must be made individually. To take responsibility for the various relationships in which an individual finds him- or herself is a possibility open to every human being, but it does not follow that every human being chooses to do so as a matter of course. The meaning of a person's life for Wilhelm depends on how she takes responsibility for her current and future choices, and how she takes ownership of those choices already made. For Wilhelm, the ethically-governed person takes responsibility for past actions, some good and some bad, seeks consistency, and takes seriously the obligation to live in a passionate and devoted way.

==== Stage Three: Religious ====
The ethical and the religious are intimately connected: a person can be ethically serious without being religious, but the religious stage includes the ethical. Whereas living in the ethical sphere involves a commitment to some ethical absolute, living in the religious sphere involves a commitment and relation to God.

The Kierkegaardian pseudonyms who speak of stage theory consider religion to be the highest stage in human existence. In one discussion of religious life, one of Kierkegaard's pseudonyms, Johannes Climacus, distinguishes two types within this stage, which have been called Religiousness A and Religiousness B. One type is symbolized by the Greek philosopher Socrates, whose passionate pursuit of the truth and individual conscience came into conflict with his society. Another type of religiousness is one characterized by the realization that the individual is sinful and is the source of untruth. In time, through revelation and in direct relationship with the paradox that is Jesus, the individual begins to see that their eternal salvation rests on a paradox—God, the transcendent, coming into time in human form to redeem human beings. For Kierkegaard, the very notion of this occurring was scandalous to human reason—indeed, it must be, and if it is not then one does not truly understand the Incarnation nor the meaning of human sinfulness. For Kierkegaard, the impulse towards an awareness of a transcendent power in the universe is what religion is. Religion has a social and an individual (not just personal) dimension. But it begins with the individual and their awareness of sinfulness.

In Kierkegaard's meaning, purely theological assertions are subjective truths and they cannot be either verified or invalidated by science, i.e. through objective knowledge. For him, choosing if one is for or against a certain subjective truth is a purely arbitrary choice. He calls the jump from objective knowledge to religious faith a leap of faith, since it means subjectively accepting statements which cannot be rationally justified. For him the Christian faith is the result of the trajectory initiated by such choices, which don't have and cannot have a rational ground (meaning that reason is neither for or against making such choices). Objectively regarded, purely theological assertions are neither true nor false.

== Kierkegaard's thoughts on other philosophers ==
=== Kierkegaard and Hegel ===
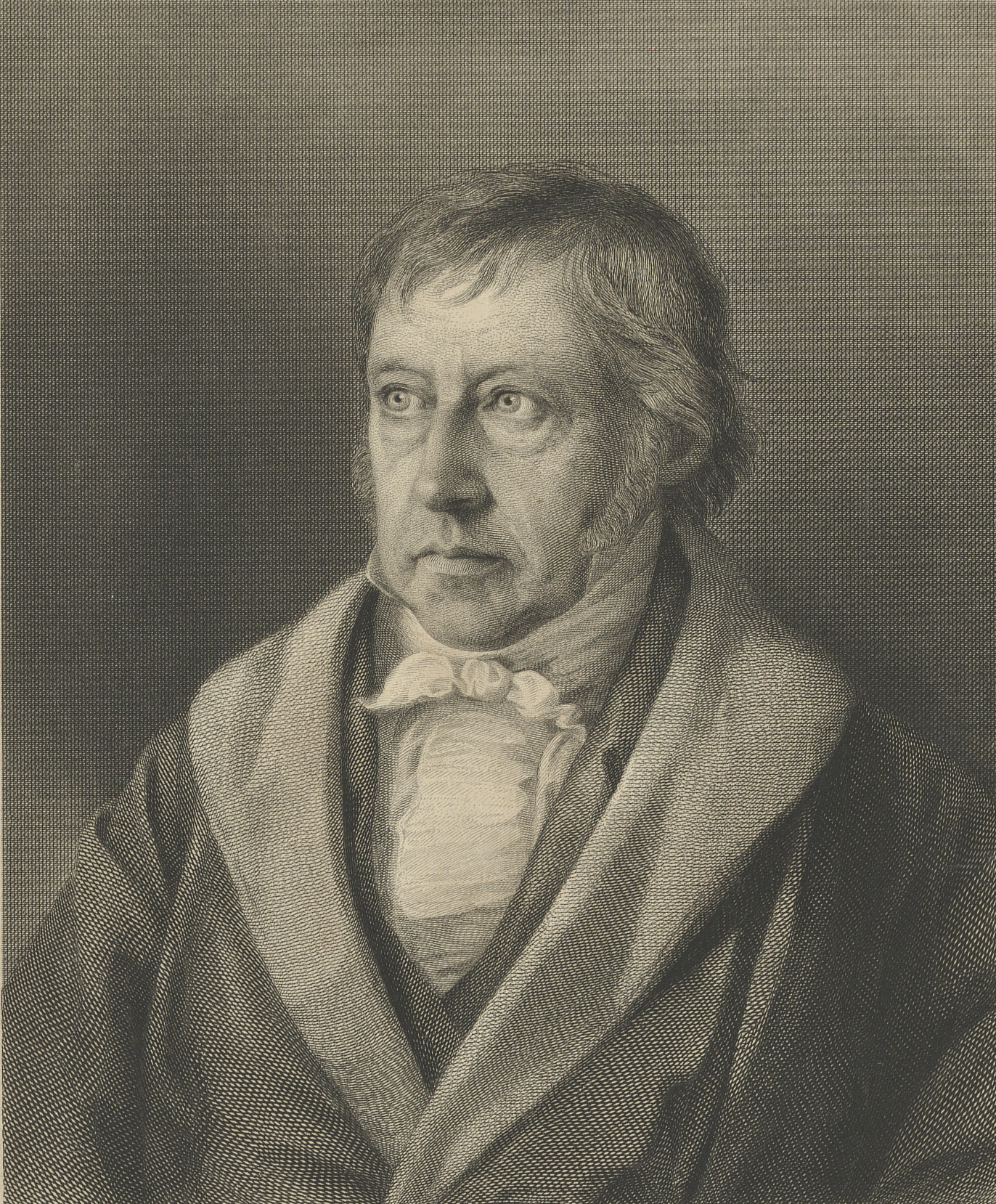
Hegel

Many philosophers think that one of Kierkegaard's greatest contributions to philosophy is his critique of Georg Wilhelm Friedrich Hegel. Indeed, many of Kierkegaard's works are written in response to or as a critique of Hegel. Although Kierkegaard strongly criticized some aspects of Hegelian philosophy, his work also shows that he was also positively influenced by Hegel, and had respect for Hegel himself. In a journal entry made in 1844, Kierkegaard wrote:

If Hegel had written the whole of his logic and then said, in the preface or some other place, that it was merely an experiment in thought in which he had even begged the question in many places, then he would certainly have been the greatest thinker who had ever lived. As it is, he is merely comic.

— Søren Kierkegaard, (Journals, 1844)

While Kierkegaard was a student of theology at the University of Copenhagen, Hegelianism had become increasingly popular. Johan Ludvig Heiberg and Hans Lassen Martensen were key figures in Danish Hegelianism. Kierkegaard remarked in his journal on 17 May 1843 that Heiberg's writings were "borrowed" from Hegel, implying Heiberg would have been a nobody without Hegel.

Kierkegaard objected to Hegel's claim that he had devised a system of thought that could explain the whole of reality, with a dialectical analysis of history leading the way to this whole. Hegel claimed that the doctrines and history of Christianity could be explained as a part of the rational unfolding and development of our understanding of the natural world and our place within it. Kierkegaard considered Hegel's explanation of Christianity as a necessary part of world history to be a distortion of the Christian message and a misunderstanding of the limits of human reason. He attempted to refute this aspect of Hegel's thought by suggesting that many doctrines of Christianity - including the doctrine of Incarnation, a God who is also human - cannot be explained rationally but remain a logical paradox.

To refute Hegel's claim that Christianity should be understood as a part of the necessary evolution of thought, or in Hegelians terms, Spirit, in Fear and Trembling, Kierkegaard attempts to use the story of Abraham to show that there is a goal higher than that of ethics (questioning the Hegelian claim that doing one's ethical duty is the highest that can be said of a human being) and that faith cannot be explained by Hegelian ethics, (disproving Hegel's claim that Christianity can be rationally explained by philosophy). Either way, this work can be read as a challenge to the Hegelian notion that a human being's ultimate purpose is to fulfill ethical demands.

Kierkegaard's strategy was to invert this dialectic by seeking to make everything more difficult. Instead of seeing scientific knowledge as the means of human redemption, he regarded it as the greatest obstacle to redemption. Instead of seeking to give people more knowledge he sought to take away what passed for knowledge. Instead of seeking to make God and Christian faith perfectly intelligible he sought to emphasize the absolute transcendence by God of all human categories. Instead of setting himself up as a religious authority, Kierkegaard used a vast array of textual devices to undermine his authority as an author and to place responsibility for the existential significance to be derived from his texts squarely on the reader. ... Kierkegaard's tactic in undermining Hegelianism was to produce an elaborate parody of Hegel's entire system. The pseudonymous authorship, from Either/Or to Concluding Unscientific Postscript, presents an inverted Hegelian dialectic which is designed to lead readers away from knowledge rather than towards it.

— Søren Kierkegaard, William McDonald

By doing this, Hegelian critics accuse Kierkegaard of using the dialectic to disprove the dialectic, which seems somewhat contradictory and hypocritical. However, Kierkegaard would not claim the dialectic itself is bad, only the Hegelian premise that the dialectic would lead to a harmonious reconciliation of everything, which Hegel called the Absolute.

Kierkegaardian scholars have made several interpretations of how Kierkegaard proceeds with parodying Hegel's dialectic. One of the more popular interpretations argues the aesthetic-ethical-religious stages are the triadic process Kierkegaard was talking about. See section Spheres of existence for more information. Another interpretation argues for the world-individual-will triadic process. The dialectic here is either to assert an individual's own desire to be independent and the desire to be part of a community. Instead of reconciliation of the world and the individual where problems between the individual and society are neatly resolved in the Hegelian system, Kierkegaard argues that there's a delicate bond holding the interaction between them together, which needs to be constantly reaffirmed. Jean-Paul Sartre takes this latter view and says the individual is in a constant state of reaffirming their own identity, else one falls into bad faith.

This process of reconciliation leads to a "both/and" view of life, where both thesis and antithesis are resolved into a synthesis, which negates the importance of personal responsibility and the human choice of either/or. The work Either/Or is a response to this aspect of Hegel's philosophy. A passage from that work exemplifies Kierkegaard's contempt for Hegel's philosophy:

Marry, and you will regret it. Do not marry, and you will also regret it. Marry or do not marry, you will regret it either way. Whether you marry or you do not marry, you will regret it either way. Laugh at the stupidities of the world, and you will regret it; weep over them, and you will also regret it. Laugh at the stupidities of the world or weep over them, you will regret it either way. Whether you laugh at the stupidities of the world or you weep over them, you will regret it either way. Trust a girl, and you will regret it. Do not trust her, and you will also regret it. ... Hang yourself or do not hang yourself, you will regret it either way. Whether you hang yourself or do not hang yourself, you will regret it either way. This, gentlemen, is the quintessence of all the wisdom of life.

— Søren Kierkegaard, Either/Or

=== Kierkegaard and Schelling ===
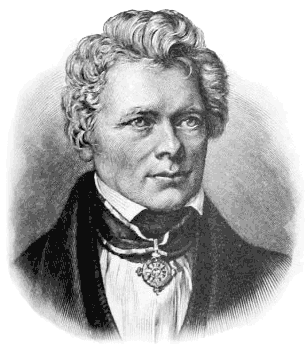
Schelling

In 1841–1842, Kierkegaard attended the Berlin lectures of Friedrich Wilhelm Joseph von Schelling. Schelling was a critic of Georg Hegel and a professor at the University of Berlin. The university started a lecture series given by Schelling in order to espouse a type of positive philosophy which would be diametrically opposed to Hegelianism. Kierkegaard was initially delighted with Schelling. Before he left Copenhagen to attend Schelling's lectures in Berlin, he wrote to his friend Peter Johannes Sprang:

I have put my trust in Schelling and at the risk of my life I have the courage to hear him once more. It may very well blossom during the first lectures, and if so one might gladly risk one's life.

— Søren Kierkegaard, (Journals, 1841)

At Berlin, Kierkegaard gave high praises to Schelling. In a journal entry made sometime around October or November 1841, Kierkegaard wrote this piece about Schelling's second lecture:

I am so pleased to have heard Schelling's second lecture -- indescribably! I have sighed for long enough and my thoughts have sighed within me; when he mentioned the word, "reality" in connection with the relation of philosophy to reality the fruit of my thought leapt for joy within me. I remember almost every word he said from that moment on. ... Now I have put all my hopes in Schelling!

— Søren Kierkegaard, (Journals, 1841)

As time went on, however, Kierkegaard, as well as many in Schelling's audience, began to become disillusioned with Schelling. In a particularly insulting letter about Schelling, Kierkegaard wrote to his brother, Peter Kierkegaard:

Schelling drivels on quite intolerably! If you want to form some idea what this is like then I ask you to submit yourself to the following experiment as a sort of self-inflicted sadistic punishment. Imagine person R's meandering philosophy, his entirely aimless, haphazard knowledge, and person Hornsyld's untiring efforts to display his learning: imagine the two combined and in addition to an impudence hitherto unequalled by any philosopher; and with that picture vividly before your poor mind go to the workroom of a prison and you will have some idea of Schelling's philosophy. He even lectures longer to prolong the torture. ... Consequently, I have nothing to do in Berlin. I am too old to attend lectures and Schelling is too old to give them. So I shall leave Berlin as soon as possible. But if it wasn't for Schelling, I would never have travelled to Berlin. I must thank him for that. ... I think I should have become utterly insane if I had gone on hearing Schelling.

— Søren Kierkegaard, (Journals, 27 February 1842)

Kierkegaard became disillusioned with Schelling partly because Schelling shifted his focus on actuality, including a discussion on quid sit [what is] and quod sit [that is], to a more mythological, psychic-type pseudo-philosophy. Kierkegaard's last writing about Schelling's lectures was on 4 February 1842.

Although Schelling had little influence on Kierkegaard's subsequent writings, Kierkegaard's trip to Berlin provided him ample time to work on his masterpiece, Either/Or. In a reflection about Schelling in 1849, Kierkegaard remarked that Schelling was like the Rhine at its mouth where it became stagnant water - he was degenerating into a Prussian "Excellency". (Journals, January 1849)

=== Kierkegaard and Schopenhauer ===
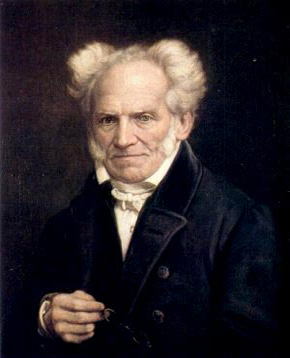
Arthur Schopenhauer

Kierkegaard became acquainted with Arthur Schopenhauer's writings quite late in his life. Kierkegaard felt Schopenhauer was an important writer, but disagreed on almost every point Schopenhauer made. In several journal entries made in 1854, a year before he died, Kierkegaard spoke highly of Schopenhauer:

In the same way that one disinfects the mouth during an epidemic so as not to be infected by breathing in the poisonous air, one might recommend students who will have to live in Denmark in an atmosphere of nonsensical Christian optimism, to take a little dose of Schopenhauer's Ethic in order to protect themselves against infection from that malodourous twaddle.

— Søren Kierkegaard, (Journals, 1854)

However, Kierkegaard also considered him, a most dangerous sign of things to come:

Schopenhauer is so far from being a real pessimist that at the most he represents 'the interesting': in a certain sense he makes asceticism interesting--the most dangerous thing possible for a pleasure-seeking age which will be harmed more than ever by distilling pleasure even out of asceticism... is by studying asceticism in a completely impersonal way, by assigning it a place in the system.

— Søren Kierkegaard, (Journals, 1854)

Kierkegaard believes Schopenhauer's ethical point of view is that the individual succeeds in seeing through the wretchedness of existence and then decides to deaden or mortify the joy of life. As a result of this complete asceticism, one reaches contemplation: the individual does this out of sympathy. He sympathizes with all the misery and the misery of others, which is to exist. Kierkegaard here is probably referring to the pessimistic nature of Schopenhauer's philosophy. One of Kierkegaard's main concerns is a suspicion of his whole philosophy:

After reading through Schopenhauer's Ethic one learns - naturally he is to that extent honest - that he himself is not an ascetic. And consequently he himself has not reached contemplation through asceticism, but only a contemplation which contemplates asceticism. This is extremely suspicious, and may even conceal the most terrible and corrupting voluptuous melancholy: a profound misanthropy. In this too it is suspicious, for it is always suspicious to propound an ethic which does not exert so much power over the teacher that he himself expresses. Schopenhauer makes ethics into genius, but that is of course an unethical conception of ethics. He makes ethics into genius and although he prides himself quite enough on being a genius, it has not pleased him, or nature has not allowed him, to become a genius where asceticism and mortification are concerned.

— Søren Kierkegaard, (Journals, 1854)

Little else is known about Kierkegaard's attitude to Schopenhauer. On Schopenhauer himself, Kierkegaard felt that Schopenhauer would have been patronizing. "Schopenhauer interests me very much, as does his fate in Germany. If I could talk to him I am sure he would shudder or laugh if I were to show him [my philosophy]." (Journals, 1854)
