= Niels Lillelund =

Danish writer, cultural journalist, op-ed columnist and restaurant critic

Niels Lillelund (born 1965) is a Danish writer, cultural journalist, op-ed columnist and restaurant critic at Jyllands-Posten.

He is the author of several books, among those a series of crime novels about the antiquarian book dealer and ex-policeman Erik Andersen, who is forced to supplement his income as a private detective. The first novel, Rouletten, takes place in and around a new casino, the first in Denmark. Lillelund worked there for some months before writing his novel. The second, Besat til anden side, is about a management consultant firm, while the third novel, Den Amerikanske Samler (The American Collector) takes us to New York in a hunt for a rare copy of Søren Kierkegaard's Either/Or. These were followed by Manden der ville vaere sund, in which the narrator tries many different methods of improving his health. The latest novel, Bibendum, takes place among wine writers and producers, a world well known to Lillelund, who has a weekly column about wine.

Lillelund holds an MA degree in Nordic literature and his non-fiction works include a book about the cultural history of poker, Gotham City - Fortællinger fra New York (transl. Gotham City: Tales from New York), a book about the city of New York, and Rhône vinene (Rhône wines), a book about the wines of the Rhône Valley.

== Bibliography ==
- Kvindedrømmer, 1999
- Rouletten, 1999
- Besat til anden side, 2000
- Den amerikanske samler, 2001
- Manden der ville være sund: stræbsomme fortællinger, 2001
- Alt lykkes i en gasovn: en bog om at lave mad, 2002
- Rhône vinene, 2004
- Bibendum, 2007
- Mr. Time Manager: Claus Møller og hans tid, 2008
- Poker: historien om et kortspil, 2008
- Gotham City: fortællinger fra New York, 2010
- Vinene fra Rhône, 2013
