= Peder Ludvig Møller =

Danish literary critic

Peder Ludvig Møller (18 April 1814 in Aalborg, Denmark – 8 December in Sotteville-Lès-Rouen, France,<> 1865) was a Danish literary critic. On 22 December 1845, Møller published an article critiquing Stages on Life's Way, a philosophical work by Søren Kierkegaard.
