= Either/Or (Batuman novel) =

Novel by Turkish-American writer Elif Batuman

- Author: Elif Batuman
- Language: English
- Publisher: Penguin Press
- Publication date: May 2022
- ISBN: 978-0-52555-759-3
- Preceded by: The Idiot

Either/Or is the second novel from Turkish American writer Elif Batuman. The novel is a bildungsroman, continuing the story of Selin, the narrator of Batuman's first novel The Idiot, in her second year at Harvard University. The title is borrowed from Danish philosopher Søren Kierkegaard's first published work.

== Plot ==
Selin Karadağ is a sophomore studying literature at Harvard University in 1996. Through the novel, Selin retrospects on her previous summer relationships, her work in Hungary, and her new travels abroad.

== Reception ==
In a positive review for The New York Times, Dwight Garner wrote that, "This novel wins you over in a million micro-observations" and that Batuman "has written about herself, or something very close to herself, in incremental, almost diaristic form, like an oyster secreting its shell." Writing for Jacobin, Amelia Ayrelan Iuvino wrote that, "Either/Or is well paced and traditional in its chronology, with a narrative structure that evokes a board game or Dorothy’s journey down the yellow brick road in The Wizard of Oz." In a mixed-to-positive review for the Los Angeles Times, Lynn Steger Strong compared the novel to The Idiot, writing that "it wore me out a bit. The texture of the two is similar: a school year plus a summer, the same brilliant, hapless young woman trying to figure out how to live and make art." Vulture described the novel in positive terms as an accompaniment with its predecessor, with Sarah Chihaya writing, "As I got further into Either/Or, all the things I’d found unsatisfactory and even irritating about The Idiot gradually started to make sense. Together, the two books give an honest depiction of how growing up actually works." The novel received a starred review from Kirkus Reviews, which described Selin as a "disarming narrator, tossing off insights that are revelatory, moving, and laugh-out-loud funny—sometimes all at once—and it’s exciting to watch her become the author of her own story."

Publishers Weekly named it one of the top ten works of fiction published in 2022.
