= The Idiot (Batuman novel) =

2017 American novel by Elif Batuman

- Author: Elif Batuman
- Language: English
- Set in: 1995
- Publication date: March 2017
- ISBN: 978-1-59420-561-3
- Followed by: Either/Or

The Idiot (2017) is the semi-autobiographical first novel by the Turkish American writer Elif Batuman. It is a bildungsroman, and concerns a college freshman, Selin, attending Harvard University in the 1990s.

== Title ==
The title, The Idiot, is a reference to Dostoevsky’s novel of the same name. According to Batuman, both novels are about naive protagonists who pursue unfortunate romantic relationships. Furthermore, Russian is an important motif throughout the novel, being the language that Selin chooses to study and where she meets her love interest, Ivan.

Batuman herself is a fan of Russian literature and studied the Russian language at Harvard. Later, she pursued a PhD in comparative literature at Stanford.

== Synopsis ==
Selin Karadağ is a freshman studying linguistics at Harvard University in 1995. She meets an older Hungarian mathematics student, Ivan, in a Russian language class and the two begin corresponding over email, and occasionally spend time together in person. While Selin and Ivan at times seem interested in each other romantically, neither knows how or when to express their feelings. The summer after her freshman year, Selin travels to Paris with her college friend Svetlana, and then to Hungary to teach English in a remote village, a job she accepts partly to be closer to Ivan. At the end of the summer, Selin returns to Harvard and Ivan goes to California to pursue graduate mathematics.

== Process ==
Batuman wrote the first draft of the novel in the early 2000s at the age of 23, on leave from a PhD program. It was only a few years after her own experience as a student at Harvard University. Nearly two decades later, she picked up the draft again and began to revise it, at the age of 38. She cut a lot of the original manuscript. According to Batuman, this allowed her to put perspective on her writing and her own college experience.

== Reception ==
The Idiot was a 2018 Pulitzer Prize Finalist in Fiction. The nomination calls the novel "A tender, funny portrait, devoid of sentimentality."

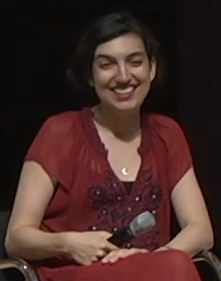
Elif Batuman, the author, in 2018

Writing for The New York Times, Dwight Garner describes how "Each paragraph is a small anthology of well-made observations." However, Garner ultimately describes the protagonist, Selin, as "an interesting human who, very much like this wry but distant novel, never becomes an enveloping one." Conversely, Annalisa Quinn of NPR asserts that "The Idiot encapsulates those years of humiliating, but vibrant, confusion that come in your late teens, a confusion that's not even sexual, but existential and practical". Quinn concludes, "The Idiot is both boring and strangely intense, fraught and apparently meaningless, confusing and inevitable, endless – and over in a moment." Vox gave the novel 3.5 stars out of 5, with reviewer Constance Grady noting that "the atmosphere at the heart of The Idiot is one of linguistic alienation, when the distance between what words say and what they mean seems insurmountable." Grady further describes how "the heartbreak that ensues is slightly melancholy, but it’s not overwhelming: The Idiot doesn’t bring you in close enough for that. It keeps you far enough away that you have to pay more attention to its words than to the emotions that they’re describing."

== Awards ==
Year	Award	Category	Result	Ref.
2017	Los Angeles Times Book Prize	First Fiction (Art Seidenbaum Award)	Finalist	
2018	Pulitzer Prize	Fiction	Finalist	
2018	Women's Prize for Fiction	—	Shortlisted	

== Film adaptation ==
In 2019, it was announced that Sandi Tan would direct an adaptation of The Idiot. Tan called the novel "the intelligent, creative young woman's Twilight".
