= Three Discourses on Imagined Occasions =

1845 book by Søren Kierkegaard

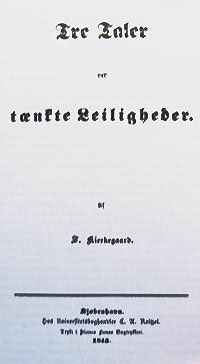
- First edition, title page.
- Author: Søren Kierkegaard
- Original title: Tre Taler ved tænkte Leiligheder
- Working title: Three Discourses on Imagined Occasions
- Translators: David F. Swenson and Howard V. Hong and Edna H. Hong
- Cover artist: Frank Mahood
- Language: Danish
- Subject: Christianity
- Published: April 29, 1845
- Publication place: Denmark
- Media type: Hardback
- Pages: 114
- ISBN: 9780691140742
- Preceded by: Four Upbuilding Discourses, 1844
- Followed by: Stages on Life's Way

Three Discourses on Imagined Occasions (1845) is a book written by Søren Kierkegaard.

== Contents ==
Soren Aaby Kierkegaard published Three Discourses on Imagined Occasions on April 29, 1845, and Stages on Life's Way on April 30, 1845. Both books were divided into three sections: confession, marriage and death. David F. Swenson translated the book as Thoughts on Crucial Situations in Human Life in 1941, and Howard V. Hong and Edna H. Hong did so again in 1993 under the title, Three Discourses on Imagined Occasions.

Each of these books revolves around the anxiety of making a decision. Kierkegaard also wrote on the subject in his other writings.

=== What It Means to Seek God ===
In the book, he suspects that his father Michael suffered from a "sickness of the spirit" due to something he had done as a young man or while grieving the loss of his first wife Lee M. Hollander. He writes that his father was only twelve when he cursed God, and didn't have faith that he would forgive him while he was still young.

Kierkegaard then warns against expressing skepticism because "the most dangerous condition is that of the one who is deceived by much knowledge," Kierkegaard again discussed this in his 1847 book, Works of Love in an effort to show how useless it is to compare sin for sin and guilt for guilt.

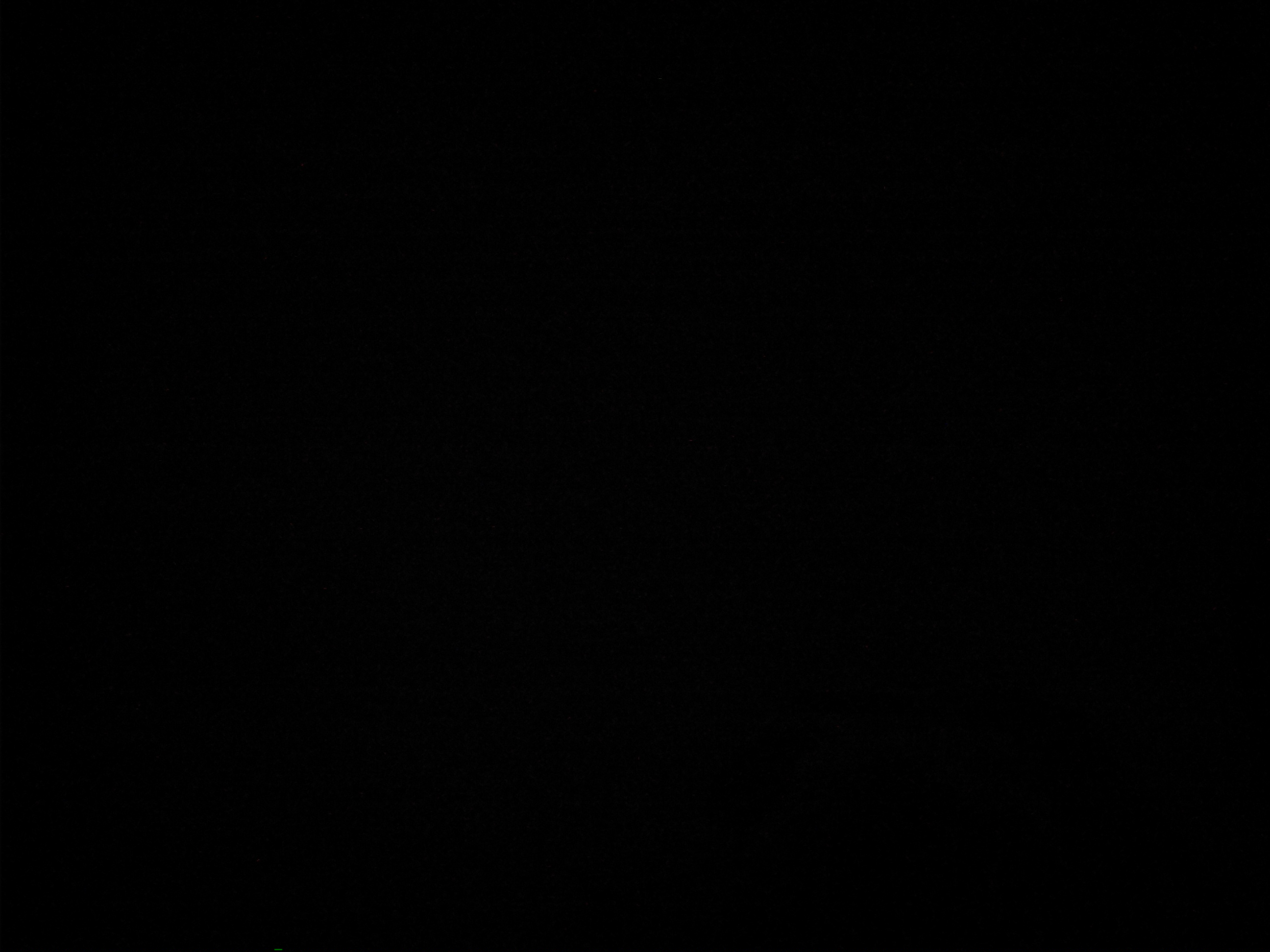
Kierkegaard's world of the Spirit

Kierkegaard was interested in "how" one comes to acquire knowledge. Adolph Peter Adler's experience may have influenced this writing, as he identified his audience as the "reader" and the "listener". He writes, "No man can see God without purity,” and “no man can know God without becoming a sinner.” He also wrote greatly about "expectancy" and where it is found. He writes, "Sin is the common lot of the human race".

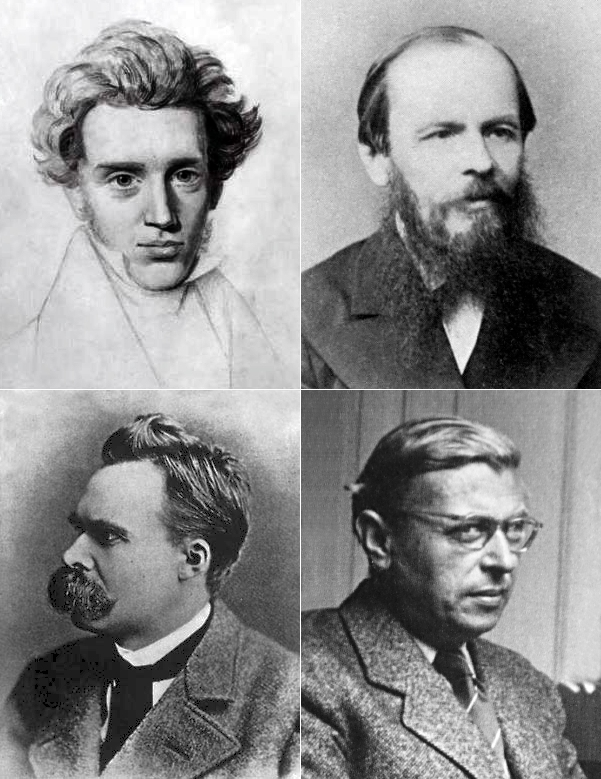
Kierkegaard, Dostoyevsky, Nietzsche, Sartre; all sinners

=== The Decisiveness of Death ===
Throughout the book Kierkegaard discusses the "confession of sin before God" and the confession of love for another. Unlike his book Eighteen Upbuilding Discourses, he describes the earnest confession before God, marriage, and death as teachers of another kind that accompanies generations. Later, he uses the metaphor "lily of the field and the bird of the air" as teachers for what it means to be a human being, referring to them as "divinely appointed teachers".

== Criticism ==
Kierkegaard self-published this book by printing 525 copies, however only 175 were sold by 1847. A second edition was published in 1875, and he had already finished his concluding postscript and delivered it to his printer in December 1845.

David F. Swenson translated many of Kierkegaard's works into English and helped introduce him to the English reading public in 1916. The translated copy was published in 1941.

Howard V. Hong said Kierkegaard had “seeds for more than six discourses in mind". John Gates scarcely mentioned the Imagined Discourses in his book on the life of Kierkegaard, but he did describe it as a turning point in the development of his vocation and an insight into his manner of writing.
