= Letters from Hell =

1866 novel by Valdemar Adolph Thisted

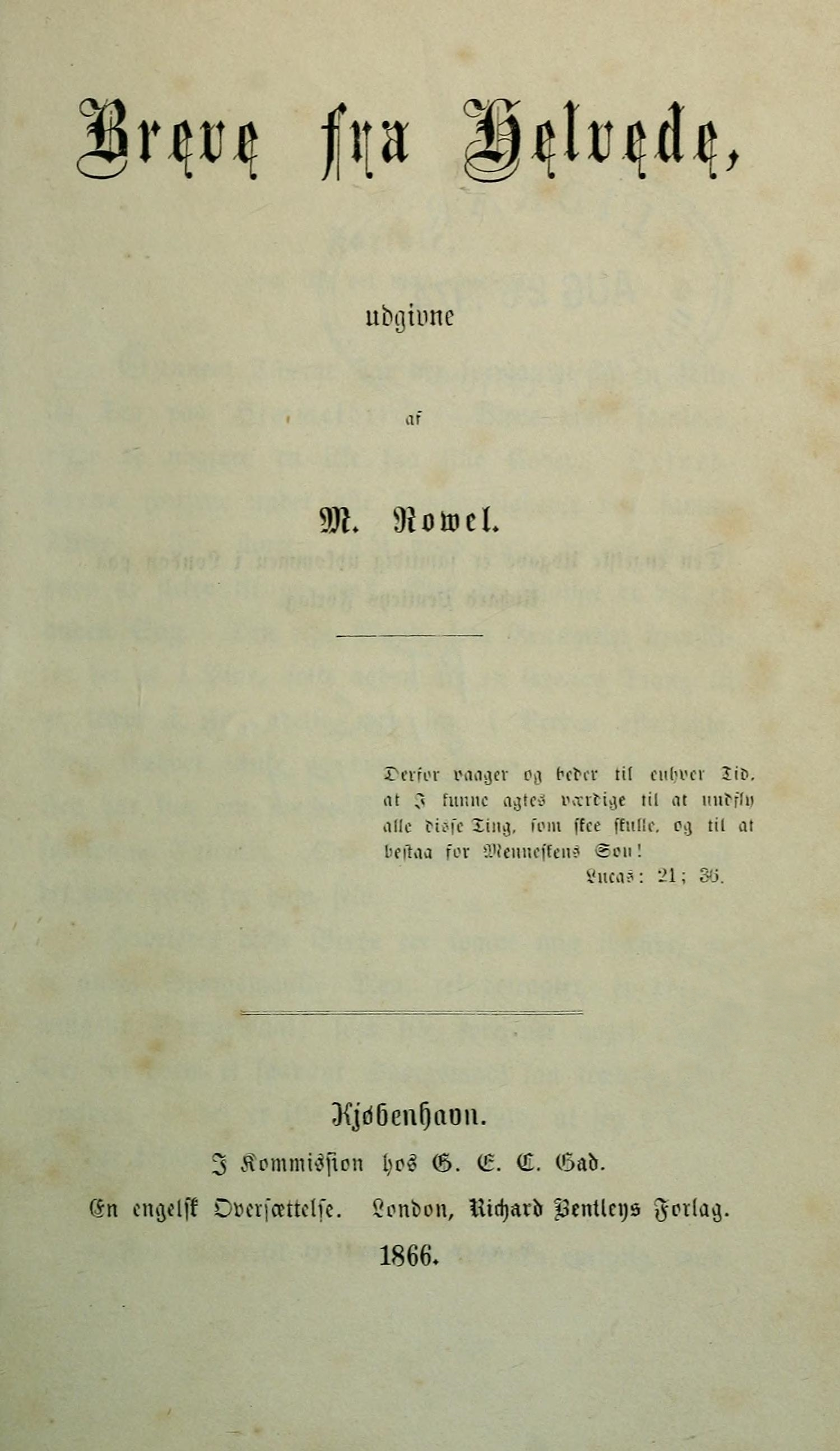
1866 title page

Letters from Hell (Danish: Breve fra Helvede) is a didactic Christian novel by the Danish priest and author Valdemar Adolph Thisted (1815–1887), The work was published in Copenhagen in 1866 and went through 12 editions in its first year.

The setting of the novel is Hell, a typical fantasy setting.

== Plot summary ==
The narrator, Otto, who has died in the prime of life, relates the torments and regrets that are a consequence of the self-centred and dissipated life he led in the world. He also describes the fates of other lost souls who inhabit Hell, concluding with the arrival in Hell of the narrator's mother. Some of the book's descriptions of Hell are reminiscent of Emanuel Swedenborg's Heaven and Hell.

== Translations ==
An English edition of Letters from Hell appeared in 1866, under the pseudonym of M Rowel. The translator was Rev. Mordaunt Roger Barnard. The book's title caused it to be banned by Mudie's circulating library. Letters from Hell went through several editions in the 19th century, one of which (1884) contained a preface by George MacDonald. Thisted's name does not appear in these editions and the translation is attributed to LWJS. In a 1911 edition, the translator is identified as Julie Sutter.

== Reception ==
C. S. Lewis had read Letters from Hell and something of its influence may be detected in The Screwtape Letters. Hans Christian Andersen was absorbed by the book and found details reminiscent of his own fairy-tales.
