= Double-mindedness =

Philosophical concept

Double-mindedness is a concept used in theology and philosophy. In Christian theology, the term comes from the Bible in the Epistle of James, where the author exhorts the reader to avoid the self-deception that comes from being halfhearted in one's commitment to God. The Danish philosopher Søren Kierkegaard used the same term but made it refer to insincerity, egoism, or fear of punishment. The term was to help him develop his own systematic way to try to detect double-mindedness in himself.

== Epistle of James ==
In the first chapter of the Epistle of James, the author warns the reader against deceiving him or herself by doubting God during prayer. In Christianity, this idea is frequently connected to Jesus' teaching about worshipping God wholeheartedly instead of serving two masters at once.

In the King James Version of the Bible, the text reads,

If any of you lack wisdom, let him ask of God, that giveth to all men liberally, and upbraideth not; and it shall be given him. But let him ask in faith, nothing wavering. For he that wavereth is like a wave of the sea driven with the wind and tossed. For let not that man think that he shall receive any thing of the Lord. A double minded man is unstable in all his ways. Let the brother of low degree rejoice in that he is exalted: (emphasis added)

=== Recurring theme ===
This theme of self-deception reappears later in the same chapter, when the author uses the analogy of forgetting one's own reflection in the mirror immediately after seeing it, to highlight the ridiculousness of hearing the scriptures without obeying them:

But be doers of the word, and not hearers only, deceiving yourselves. For if anyone is a hearer of the word and not a doer, he is like a man who looks intently at his natural face in a mirror. For he looks at himself and goes away and at once forgets what he was like. But the one who looks into the perfect law, the law of liberty, and perseveres, being no hearer who forgets but a doer who acts, he will be blessed in his doing. (emphasis added)

The same theme is repeated in the conclusion of the chapter:

If anyone thinks he is religious and does not bridle his tongue but deceives his heart, this person's religion is worthless. Religion that is pure and undefiled before God the Father is this: to visit orphans and widows in their affliction, and to keep oneself unstained from the world (emphasis added).

== Søren Kierkegaard ==
Kierkegaard asked himself: "Do I want to be a Christian or not? Do I want to be a preacher or not? Do I want to be a teacher or not? Do I want to get married or not?" Many people were willing to give him advice, but he felt the decision was ultimately his own. He believed individuals fear making a decision because of external opposition, but this need not stop one from making a decision, as long as one has the capacity to learn through experience whether the decision was a good one.

The first type of double-mindedness, willing for the sake of reward or out of fear of punishment, is akin to the distinction between intrinsic and extrinsic values. The second type of double-mindedness, willing only to a certain degree, is akin to distraction or half-hearted willing. Each type of double-mindedness is a human weakness and an obstacle to an individual pursuit of greatness and strength towards willing and reaching the Good. To counter double-mindedness, Kierkegaard argued that discipline and clarity of the self is essential and necessary. He believed that double-mindedness isn't evil but a person not recognizing that they are a self-contradiction and double-minded is self-deceit.

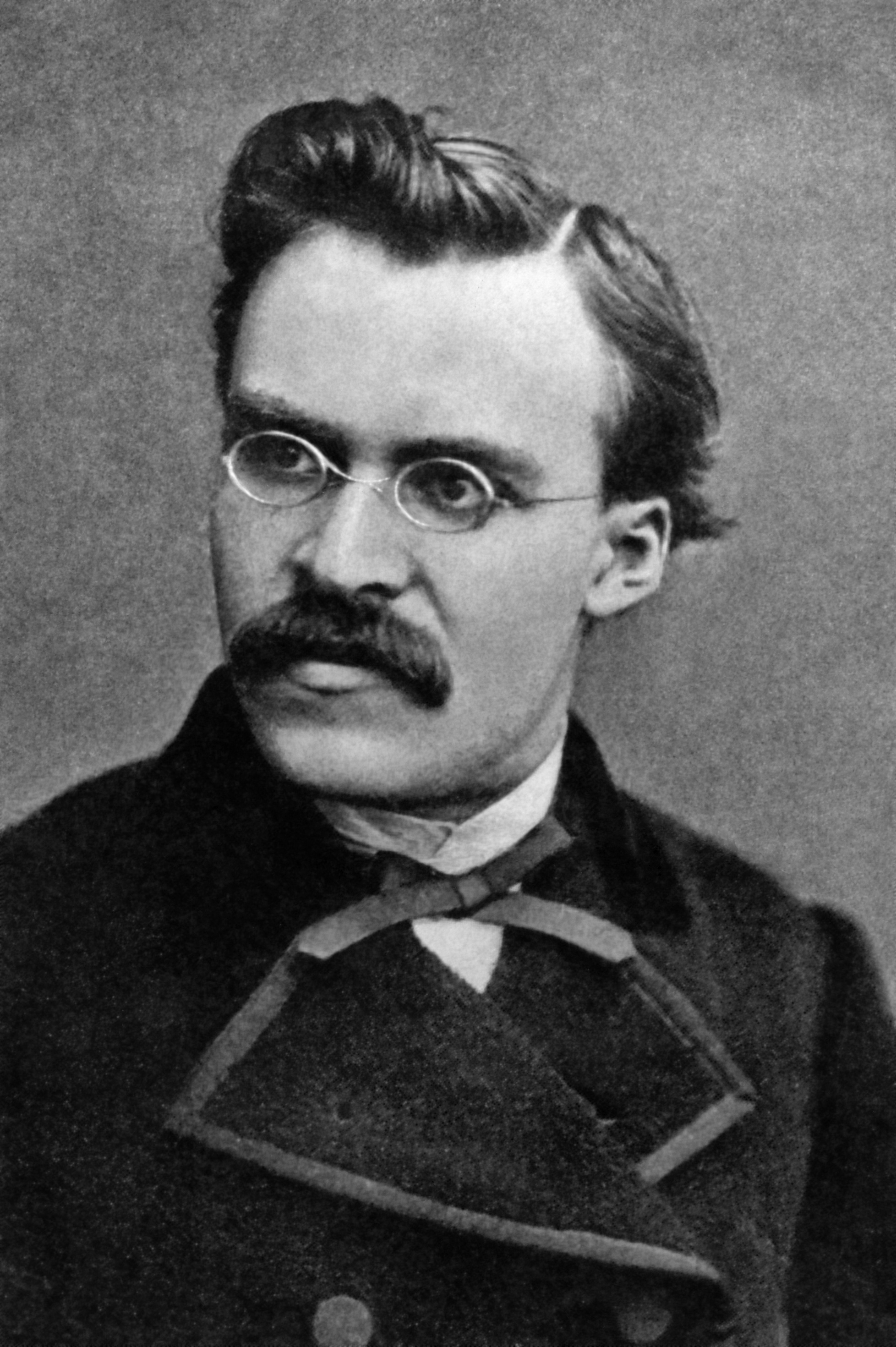
Friedrich Nietzsche around 1869 spoke of Übermensch.

== Sources ==
- The Bible: The Book of James
- D. Anthony Storm's Commentary on Upbuilding Discourses In Various Spirits
- Purity of Heart Is to Will One Thing, by Søren Kierkegaard, March 13, 1847
- Anthony Storm's Commentary on Eighteen Upbuilding Discourses
- Wikiquote Soren Kierkegaard, Four Upbuilding Discourses, 1844
