= Elif Batuman =

American writer and academic (born 1977)

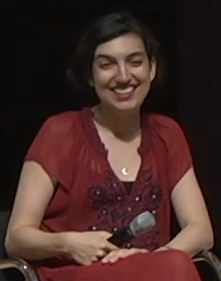
- Batuman in 2018
- Born: 1977 (age 48–49); New York City, US
- Education: Harvard College; Stanford University
- Occupations: Author; academic; journalist
- Years active: 2006–present
- Website: elifbatuman.com

Elif Batuman (born 1977) is an American author, academic, and journalist. She is the author of three books: a memoir, The Possessed (2010), the novel The Idiot (2017), which was a finalist for the 2018 Pulitzer Prize for Fiction, and Either/Or (2022). Batuman is a staff writer for The New Yorker.

== Early life ==
Elif Batuman was born in New York City to Turkish parents, and grew up in New Jersey. She graduated from Harvard College in 1999 and received her doctorate in comparative literature from Stanford University. While attending graduate school, Batuman studied the Uzbek language in Samarkand, Uzbekistan. Her dissertation, The Windmill and the Giant: Double-Entry Bookkeeping in the Novel, is about the process of social research and solitary construction undertaken by novelists.

== Career ==
In February 2010, Batuman published her first book, The Possessed: Adventures with Russian Books and the People Who Read Them, based on material she previously published in The New Yorker, Harper's Magazine, and N+1, which details her experiences as a comparative literature graduate student at Stanford University. Reviewing the book for The New York Times, critic Dwight Garner praised the "winsome and infectious delight she feels in the presence of literary genius and beauty."

Batuman's novel The Idiot is partly based on her own experiences attending Harvard in the mid-1990s and teaching English in Hungary in the summer of 1996. It was a finalist for the 2018 Pulitzer Prize for Fiction.

Batuman was writer-in-residence at Koç University in Istanbul, Turkey, from 2010 to 2013. She now lives in New York. In 2016, she met her partner; she wrote that this relationship, her first non-heterosexual one, "resulted in a series of changes to my views not just of gender but also of genre" as Batuman realized how much film and narrative had influenced her ideas about how women should behave.

Batuman's 2018 article in The New Yorker on Japan's rental family industry won the National Magazine Award. In 2021, the magazine returned the award after an investigation revealed that three subjects in the essay had made false statements to Batuman and the magazine's fact-checkers.

== Influences ==
Russian literature figures heavily in Batuman's work. Batuman says that her obsession with Russian literature began when she read Aleksandr Solzhenitsyn’s The Gulag Archipelago in high school. Both The Possessed and The Idiot pay homage to Batuman's favorite Russian writer, Fyodor Dostoevsky.

== Personal life ==
Batuman is queer and stopped dating men at age 38. In an interview, she discussed reading Adrienne Rich's essay Compulsory Heterosexuality and Lesbian Existence after beginning to date her current partner, and how it related to The Idiot's protagonist, Selin.

== Bibliography ==
=== Novels ===
- The Idiot, Penguin Press, 2017. ISBN 978-1-594-20561-3.
- Either/Or, Penguin Press, 2022. ISBN 978-0525557593.

=== Nonfiction ===
- The Possessed, Farrar, Straus and Giroux, 2010. ISBN 978-0374532185.

=== Uncollected short stories ===
- Batuman, Elif (April 25 – May 2, 2022). "The repugnant conclusion". The New Yorker. 98 (10): 56–65.

=== Uncollected essays and articles ===
- Elif Batuman (Jan 16, 2006), "Cool Heart". The New Yorker.
- Batuman, Elif (February 2009). "The murder of Leo Tolstoy". Harper's. 318 (1905): 45–53.
- Batuman, Elif (2010). The possessed : adventures with Russian books and the people who read them. Macmillan.
- Elif Batuman (September 23, 2010). "Get a Real Degree". London Review of Books.
- Elif Batuman (December 31, 2010). "From the Critical Impulse, the Growth of Literature". The New York Times.
- Elif Batuman (April 21, 2011). "Elif Batuman: Life after a bestseller". The Guardian. Archived from the original on April 21, 2011.
- Batuman, Elif (December 19–26, 2011). "Dept. of Archaeology: The Sanctuary". The New Yorker. 87 (41): 72–83. Göbekli Tepe
- Two Rivers. Carolyn Drake, self-published, 2013. ISBN 978-0-615-78764-0. Edition of 700 copies. By Carolyn Drake. Accompanied by a separate book with a short essay by Batuman and notes by Drake.
- — (April 6, 2015). "Electrified : adventures in transcranial direct-current stimulation". Annals of the Mind. The New Yorker. 91 (7): 24–32. (Note: Online version is titled "Adventures in transcranial direct-current stimulation".)
- "The Big Dig". The New Yorker. August 31, 2015.
- "The head scarf, modern Turkey, and me". The New Yorker. February 8–15, 2016.
- — (December 19–26, 2016). "Epictetus". Visionaries. The New Yorker. 92 (42): 84. (Note: Online version is titled "How to be a Stoic".)
- "Japan's Rent-a-Family Industry". The New Yorker. April 30, 2018.

=== Interviews ===
- Elif Batuman in conversation with Full Stop (December 14, 2011).
- "The books that made me" | "My stress read? Epictetus during a dental procedure", The Guardian (April 28, 2018).
- Elif Batuman on the Longform Podcast (June 6, 2018).
- Elif Batuman, interviewed by Yen Pham for White Review (June, 2017)
- Elif Batuman, interviewed by The Daily Stoic
- Elif Batuman, interviewed by Cecilia Barron for The College Hill Independent

== Awards ==
- Rona Jaffe Foundation Writers' Award, 2007.
- Whiting Award, 2010.
- Finalist for the Pulitzer Prize, 2017.
