= The Point of View of My Work as an Author =

Book by Søren Kierkegaard

The Point of View of My Work as an Author (subtitle: A Direct Communication, Report to History) is an autobiographical account of the 19th-century Danish philosopher Søren Kierkegaard's use of his pseudonyms.

== Overview ==
The work was written in 1848, published in part in 1851 (as On my Work as an Author), and published in full posthumously in 1859. This work explains his pseudonymous writings and his personal attachment to those writings. Walter Lowrie, a Kierkegaardian translator and scholar, called this an autobiography "so unique that it has no parallel in the whole literature of the world."

I will allow someone else to speak, my poet, who, when he comes, will usher me to the place among those who have suffered for an idea and say: "The martyrdom this author suffered can be described quite briefly in this way: He suffered being a genius in a market town. ... Yet also here in the world he found what he sought: "that single individual"; if no one else was that, he himself was and became that more and more.

— Søren Kierkegaard, The Point of View in the Essential Kierkegaard, pp. 79–80

However, Kierkegaard did make the following remarks in The Point of View that cast doubt on whether he regarded the pseudonymous writings as highly as he did his Christian writings. He published Either/Or under the pseudonym, Victor Eremita, February 20, 1843, and Two Edifying Discourses, May 16, 1843 under his own name. The Point of View is his own interpretation of his work up to 1848. He had just published Works of Love in 1847, where he attempted to explain how to love your neighbor as yourself.

Although Either/Or attracted all the attention, and nobody noticed the Two Edifying Discourses, this book betokened, nevertheless, that the edifying was precisely what must come to the fore, that the author was a religious author, who for this reason has never written anything aesthetic, but has employed pseudonyms for all the aesthetic works, whereas the Two Edifying Discourses were by Magister Kierkegaard.”

— Søren Kierkegaard, The Point of View, Walter Lowrie, 1962 p. 12

The first group of writings represents aesthetic productivity, the last group is exclusively religious: between them, as the turning-point, lies, the Concluding Postscript. This work concerns itself with and sets ‘the Problem’, which is the problem of the whole authorship, how to become a Christian. So it takes cognizance of the pseudonymous work, and of the eighteen edifying discourses as well, showing that all of this serves to illuminate the Problem-without, however, affirming that this was the aim of the foregoing production, which indeed could not have been affirmed by a pseudonym, a third person, incapable of knowing anything about the aim of a work that was not his own. The Concluding Postscript is not an aesthetic work, but neither is it in the strictest sense religious. Hence it is by a pseudonym, though I add my name as editor-a thing I did not do in the case of any purely aesthetic work.

— Søren Kierkegaard, The Point of View, Walter Lowrie, 1962 p. 13

I held out Either/Or to the world in my left hand, and in my right the Two Edifying Discourses; but all, or as good as all, grasped with their right what I held in my left. I had made up my mind before God what I should do: I staked my case on the Two Edifying Discourses; but I understood perfectly that only very few understood them. And here for the first time comes in the category ‘that individual whom with joy and gratitude I call my reader’, a stereotyped formula which was repeated in the Preface to every collection of Edifying Discourses.

— Søren Kierkegaard, The Point of View, Walter Lowrie, 1962 p. 20

…one does not begin thus: I am a Christian; you are not a Christian. Nor does one begin thus: It is Christianity I am proclaiming; and you are living in purely aesthetic categories. No, one begins thus: Let us talk about aesthetics. The deception consists in the fact that one talks thus merely to get to the religious theme. But on our assumption, the other man is under the illusion that the aesthetics is Christianity; for, he thinks, I am a Christian, and yet he lives in aesthetic categories. …in a formal sense I can very well call Socrates my teacher-whereas I have only believed, and only believe, in One, the Lord Jesus Christ.

— Søren Kierkegaard, The Point of View, Walter Lowrie, 1962 p. 41

I felt a real Christian satisfaction in the fact that, if there were no other, there was one man who (several years before existence set the race another lesson to learn) made a practical effort on a small scale to learn the lesson of loving one’s neighbor and alas! Got at the same time a frightful insight into what an illusion Christendom is, and (a little later, to be sure) an insight also into what a situation the simpler classes suffered themselves to be seduced by paltry-newspaper writers, whose struggle or fight for equality (since it is in the service of a lie) cannot lead to any other result but to prompt the privileged classes in self-defence to stand proudly aloof from the common man, and to make the common man insolent in his forwardness.

— Søren Kierkegaard, The Point of View, Walter Lowrie, 1962 p. 49

For He has been my one confidant, and only in reliance upon His cognizance have I dared to venture what I have ventured, and to endure what I have endured, and have found bliss in the experience of being literally alone in the whole vast world, alone because wherever I was, whether in the presence of all or in the presence of a familiar friend, I was always clad in the costume of my deceit; so that I was then as much alone as in the darkness of the night; alone, not in the forests of America with their terrors and perils, but alone in the company of the most terrible possibilities, which transform even the most frightful actuality into a refreshment and relief; alone, almost with human speech against me; alone with torments which have taught me more than one new annotation to the text about the thorn in the flesh.

— Søren Kierkegaard, The Point of View, Walter Lowrie, 1962, pp. 70–71

== Criticism ==
Benjamin Nelson wrote the Preface to Lowrie's 1962 translation of Kierkegaard's Point of View. He noted the dates the book was written and published.

Consider the principal dates associated with The Point of View — 1859, the year when the work was first published, and 1848, the year when it was written. Both dates recall publications which revolutionized the worlds of thought and experience: the former, the Origin of Species, by a retiring British botanist, Charles Darwin; the latter, The Communist Manifesto, by Karl Marx and Friedrich Engels, Kierkegaard’s fellow auditor — along with Bakunin, Herzen, Feuerbach and other notable figures — of Schelling’s Berlin lectures in 1841.

Is it not odd that we look to this melancholy and splenetic Dane, who seemed to so many of his forward-looking contemporaries a ‘misanthropic traitor against mankind’, to be a foremost champion in the defense against the perversions of thought and existence which have been sired by the humanitarian spokesmen for ‘scientific eugenics’ and ‘scientific socialism’? Benjamin Nelson’s Preface to The Point of View by Soren Kierkegaard 1859 Lowrie translation 1962 p. xviii

== Notes ==
1. Essential Kierkegaard, p. 449
