= Valdemar Adolph Thisted =

Danish writer, translator and priest (1815–1887)

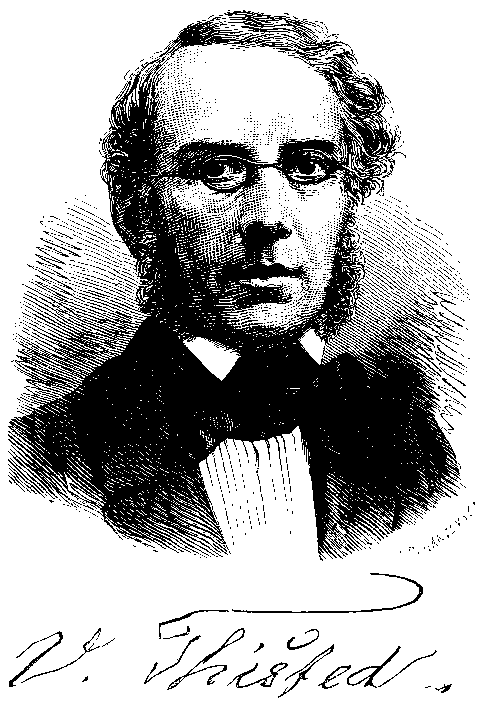
Valdemar Adolph Thisted

Valdemar Adolph Thisted (28 February 1815 – 14 October 1887) was a Danish writer, translator and priest. His works include novels, travelogues, romantic dramas and theological polemics. The writings published during his time as a pastor caused a stir because of their critical views on contemporary church issues. He is best known among English readers for his novel Letters from Hell.

== Life and works ==
Valdemar Adolph Thisted was the son of Jorgen Thisted (1795–1855), Lieutenant and later vicar of Gyrstinge and Flinterup, and Marie Elmquist (1790–1829). He was born in Aarhus. After his mother’s early death, when he was twelve years old, he moved to the home of his uncle, the War Commissioner of Elmquist in Aarhus, and attended the town's grammar school.

Before he began his theological studies in Copenhagen, he was for a time tutor in a manor house. Upon graduation in 1840, he set up a boys’ school in Skanderborg and in 1846 a secondary school. He later became an assistant professor in a secondary school in Aarhus, resigning in 1853. In 1855 he began ministering in northern Schleswig. After suffering a nervous weakness, and a fall that required him to use crutches, he resigned in 1870 and moved to Frederiksberg.

Thisted was married twice. His first marriage was to Henriette Hansen (1815–1904), a sister of the painter Constantin Hansen, and was dissolved. His second marriage was to Elisha Rasmussen (1830–1901), who became completely paralyzed for 30 years.

Thisted made his literary debut with the novel Vandring i Syden (Wandering in the South), published in 1843. The following year he began the first of his travels to Southern Europe. His subsequent works included Havfruen (Little Mermaid, 1846), Tabt og funden (Lost and Won, 1849), Episoder fra et Reiseliv (Episodes from a Reiseliv, 1850) and Romerske Mosaiker (Roman Mosaics, 1851), the fruits of a journey to Italy; the novel Sirenernes Ö (Siren's Island, 1853); the romantic dramas Hittebarnet (Abandoned Child, 1854), Neapolitaniske Aquareller (1853) and Hjemme og paa Vandring (Home and on Hiking, 1854); novelistic travel studies Örkenens Hjerte (Örkenens Heart, 1849), Bruden (Bride, 1851) and the novel Familieskatten (Family Tax, 1856).

He published a volume of poems with religious and patriotic sentiments in 1862.

His novel Breve fra Helvede (Briefe aus der Hölle), published in Copenhagen in 1866, excited considerable attention and was translated into several languages. The sensuality that coloured his previous works has a stronger suit in these Letters and certainly contributed to their success. It is his only work to have been translated into English, although a number of his works were translated into German.

Worried by the offence caused by the book, Thisted made a kind of penance in Høgholt (1868), some colorless, religious parables. Høgholt was Thisted's last work. A nerve weakness compelled him to give up both office and authorship. He moved 1870 to Frederiksberg, where he spent his seventeen years' retirement plagued by illness and bitterness at the absence of the recognition he thought he deserved. He was buried in Haderslev.

At its best, his work is characterised by a vivid descriptive power and rich fantasy but also suffers from monotony and prolixity. Thisted also wrote under the pseudonyms Emanuel St. Hermidad, Herodion and M.Rowel.
