= The Sickness unto Death (disambiguation) =

The Sickness unto Death is an 1849 book by Søren Kierkegaard

The Sickness unto Death may also refer to:

- Sickness Unto Death (manga), a 2009 Japanese comic series
- Sickness unto Death, a 1976 instrumental work by Tomasz Sikorski
- "Sickness unto Death", a song from the 2010 album Hunger and Thirst by Typhoon
- "The sickness unto death, and then...", an English translation of the Japanese title of the 1996 Neon Genesis Evangelion episode "Splitting of the Breast"
