= Rosenborggade 7–9 =

Property in Copenhagen, Denmark

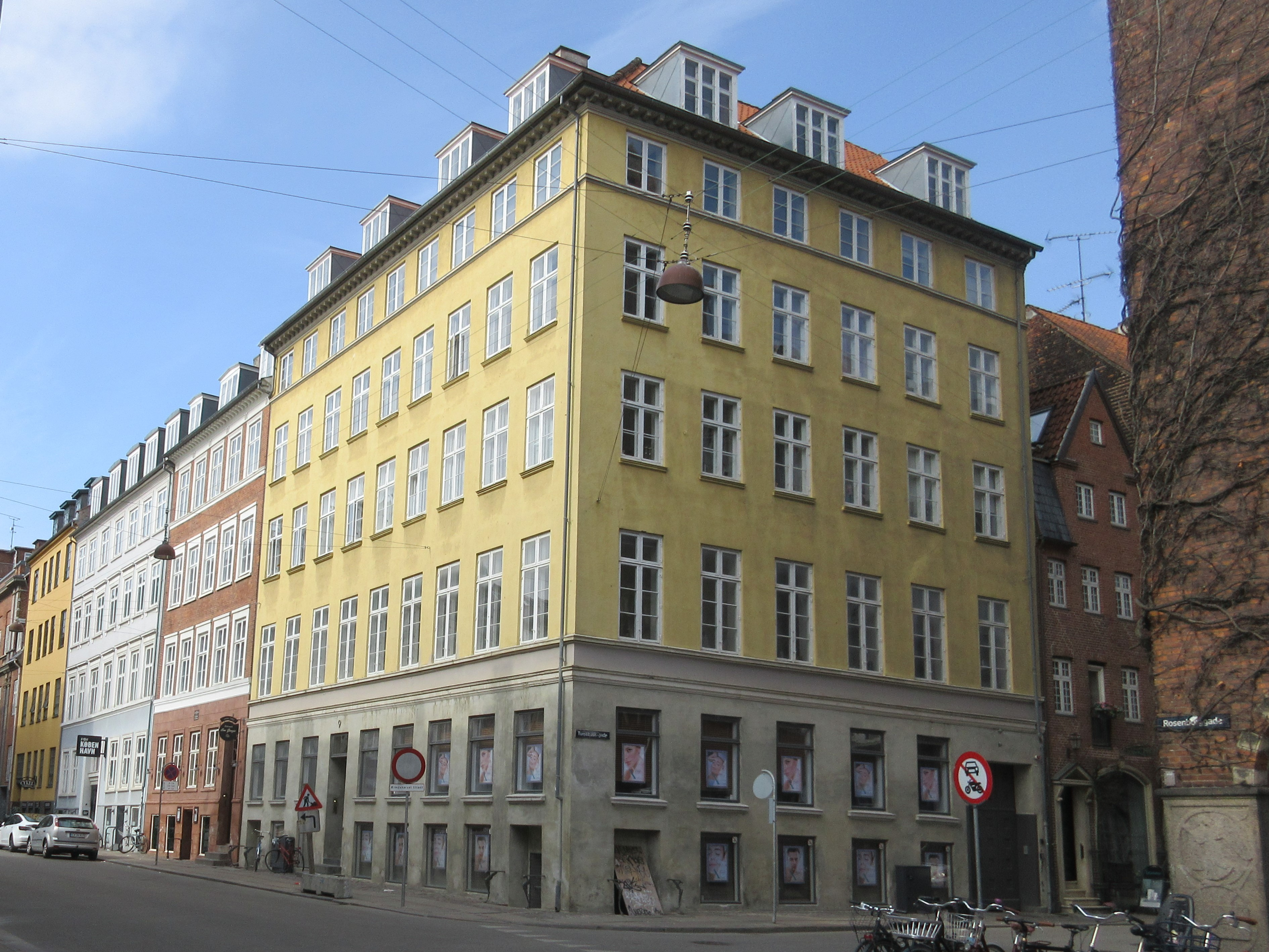
- Interactive map of the Rosenborggade 7–9 area

General information
- Location: Copenhagen, Denmark
- Coordinates: 55°41′0.89″N 12°34′26.54″E
- Completed: 1810 / 1947
- Renovated: 1847

Rosenborggade 7–9 is a complex of mid-19th-century buildings situated at the corner of Rosenborggade and Tornebuskegade, close to Nørreport station, in the Old Town of Copenhagen, Denmark. It consists of a large corner building (Rosenborggade 9/Tornebuskegade 1, 1810, heightened 1846–47), an adjacent building in Rosenborggade (No. 7, 1847) and a warehouse in the courtyard. The entire complex was listed in the Danish registry of protected buildings and places in 1975. A plaque on the facade of No. 7 commemorates that the philosopher Søren Kierkegaard resided in the building from 1848 to 1850 and that he wrote The Sickness unto Death and Practice in Christianity while he lived there. Other notable former residents include the actors Ludvig and Louise Phister who lived in the apartment on the second floor of No. 7 from 1859 until their deaths in 1896 and 1916.

== History ==
=== 17th and 18th centuries ===
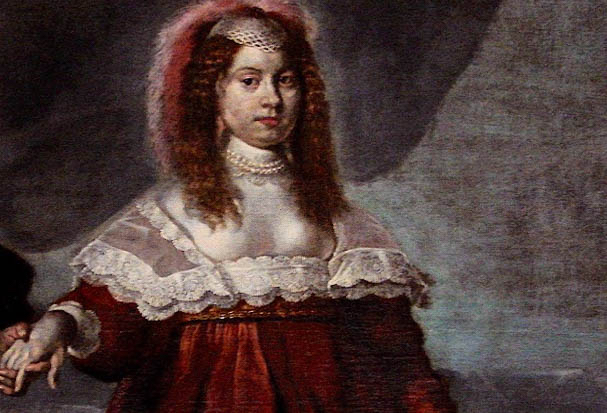
Regitze Grubbe by Karel van Mander III at the Frederiksborg National Museum

In the late 17th century, the site was part of a larger property. In 1689, it was listed as No. 66 in Klædebo Quarter and owned by Regitze Grubbe (1618–1689), widow of Hans Ulrik Gyldenløve. She did not live at the site herself, having been banished to the island of Bornholm for her complicity in the attempted murder of the Countess Parsberg in 1678.

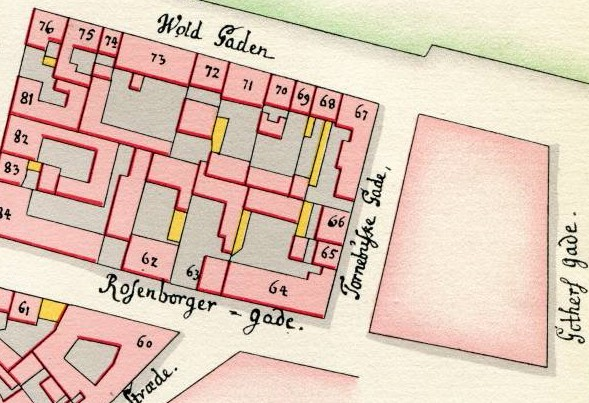
No. 64 seen in a detail from Gedde's map of Klædebo Quarter, 1757

The property was later divided into what is now Rosenborggade 7–9, Tornebuskegade No. 5 5 and Tornebuskegade No. 3. The property at the corner of Rosenborggade was listed as No. 64 in Klædebo Quarter as of 1756, owned by David Smidt.

The property was owned at the time of the 1787 census by brewer Herman Hendrich Søderberg, He lived there with his second wife Johana Sophia Koefoed, their two sons (aged three and five), two brewery workers, a caretaker, a coachman and two maids.

=== 19th century ===
The property was home to a single household at the time of the 1801 census, consisting of merchant (høker) and brewer (bryggersvend) Peder Larsen, his wife Bente Larsen, their children Lars (aged ten) and Ane Margrethe (aged four), maid Anne Larsdatter, brewery worker Mads Jacobsen and caretaker (gårdskarl) Lars Petersen.

The property was listed as No. 156 in the new cadastre of 1806. It was owned at that time by brewer Poul Alexander von Ross. The property was acquired by brewer Jacob Carstensen a few years later. He constructed the corner building (now Rosenborggade 9/Tornebuskegade 1) in 1810.

The property was later acquired by master tanner Johan Julius Gram (1799–1854). At the time of the 1850 census, he had resided with his family in one of the two ground floor apartments of the building at the corner of Tornebuskegade and Nørre Voldgade (No. 159B). In 1846–1847, he expanded the corner building (No. 156B and No. 156C) by two extra storeys. In 1847, he also constructed the building at No. 156A (now Rosenborggade 7) as well as a warehouse in the courtyard. The elegant new complex contained rental apartments towards the street while Gram's tannery was based in the yard. Abraham Hartz' tannery was based at Rosenborggade No. 155 (now Rosenborggade 5) since 1832.

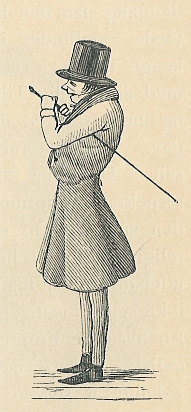
Søren Kierkegaard

The philosopher Søren Kierkegaard rented an apartment in the corner building (now No. 9) in 1848. He had been planning to take a break from his work after completing Works of Love to go on a longer journey in Europe. He mentions the apartment in his journal: "then an apartment at the corner of Tornebuskegade became vacant, an apartment I had been in love with since the day it was built. I decided to rent the apartment and then go on a shorter journey in the spring and early summer". Kierkegaard took over the apartment in April 1948 but it did not live up to his high expectations: "The tanner in whose house I live in the summer time has tormented me with odour. Numerous times have I had to almost use mental capacity on not becoming sick from impatience". In October, he moved to the first floor apartment at No. 7 but this did not help much. In April 1850, he moved to an apartment at Nørregade 5. Kierkegaard wrote The Sickness unto Death and Practice in Christianity as well as substantial parts of The Point of View of My Work as an Author and The Lilies of the Field and the Birds of the Air while he lived in the building.

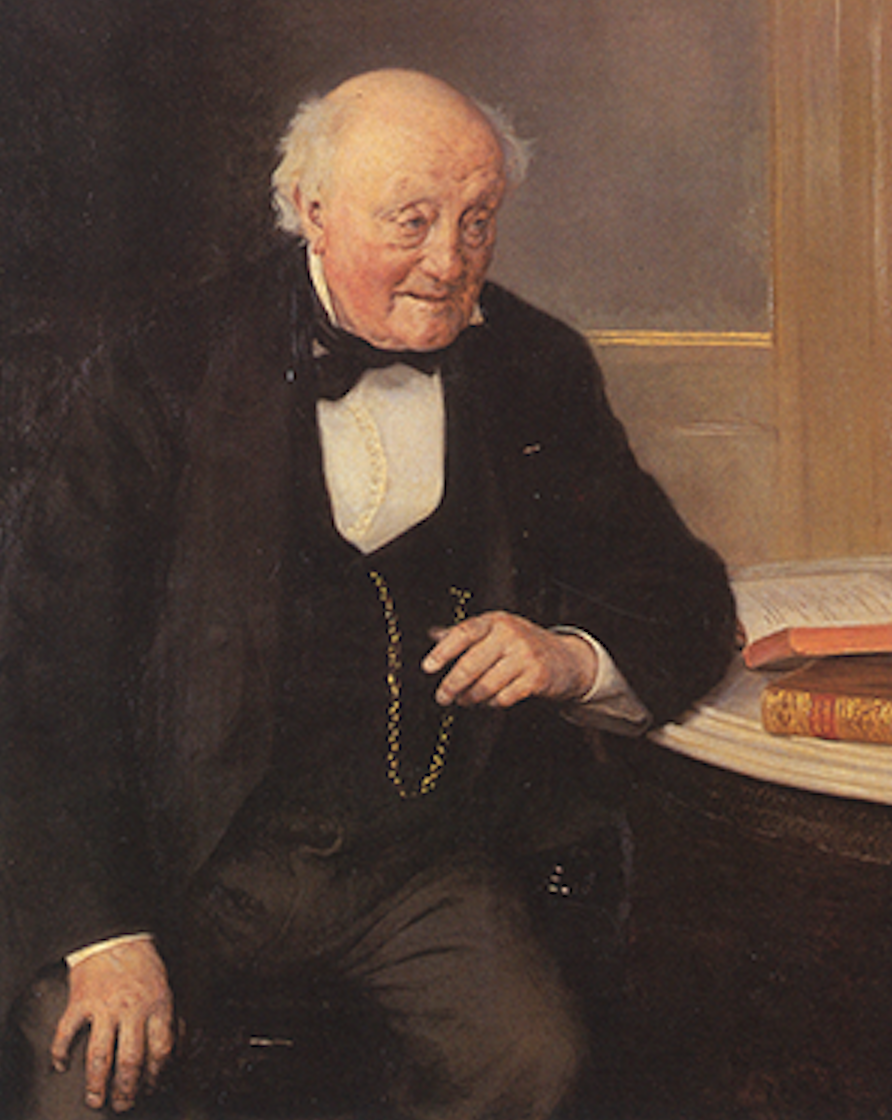
Ludvig Phister

The actors Ludvig Phister (1807–1896) and Louise Phister (née Petersen; 1816–1914) resided in the apartment on the second floor at No. 7 from 1849. They lived there until their deaths in 1896 and 1914.

No. 156 A was home to a total of 30 people at the time of the 1860 census. Ludvig and Louise Phister resided in the second floor apartment with their daughters Sophie (aged 15) and Charlotte (aged eight), a maid and a female cook. Frants Caspar Djørup (1813–1908), district physician in Copenhagen, resided in another apartment with his wife Augusta Adolphine Djørup née Oxenbøll, their two youngest children Lauritz and Ane (aged three and one), their female cook and a nanny. Augusta Adolphine Djørup née Oxenbøll was the maternal aunt of the writer Henrik Pontoppidan. A third apartment was occupied by the goldsmith Carl Christian Olsen, his wife Nicoline Kirstine Olsen née Clausen, their three children and a female lodger. Stine Smith and Maria Jensdatter, two women in their 20s, resided on the ground floor. Hanne Jacobine Holm née From, a 51-year-old divorced woman, a rare phenomenon at the time, resided with her 31-year-old unmarried daughter and a maid on the first floor. Christen Nielsen, a tavern owner, resided with his wife Marie Nielsen née Olsen in the basement.

No. 156 B (now Rosenborggade 9) was home to another 23 people at the time of the 1860 census. Frederik Christian Grove (died 1869), a civil servant in the Ministry of Finance with the title of Kammerråd, resided in one of the apartments with his daughter Hanne Georgia Grove, his sister Chatrine Marie Grove and a maid. Lucie Elise Fich (1800–1883), widow of pastor Hans Jacob Fich (1784–1852) and daughter of bishop Jens Michael Hertz, resided in another apartment with Wilhelmine Simonia Fich, widow Anna Lindorph and Lindorph's 19-year-old daughter Thora Sophie Lindorph. The two latter made a living from needlework. Søren Pedersen Lybye (1825–1898), a farmer from western Jutland and an MP, resided in the apartment on the first floor when he was in Copenhagen. Another household consisted of the 50-year-old widow Birtha Johanne Dorthea Nielsen and five of her children. Her son Jacob Nielsen (1841–1894) would later establish one of the largest book printing businesses in the country.

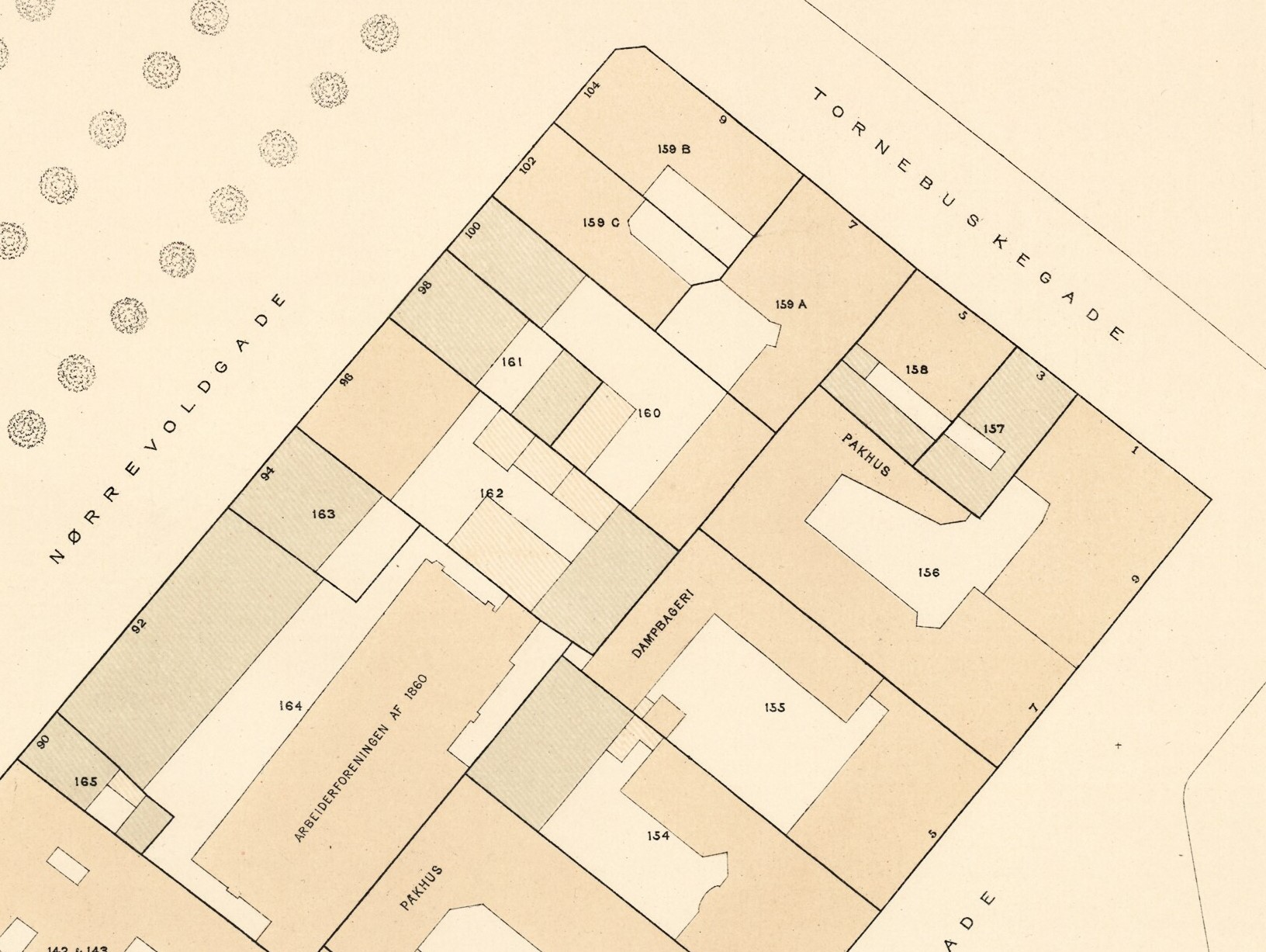
The property seen on one of Berggreen's block plans of Klædebo Quarter, 1886-88

No. 154C (now Tornebuskegade 1) was census home to a total of 34 people at the time of the 1860. The residents included Johan Nicolay Lange (1814–1865), a Lutheran minister associated with Almindelig Hospital and Abel Cathrines Stiftelse.

No. 7–9 was home to a total of 79 people at the time of the 1880 census.

== Architecture ==
=== Rosenborggade 7 ===
Rosenborggade 7 is constructed with four storeys over a walk-out basement and is five bays wide towards the street. An eight-bay perpendicular wing extends from the rear side of the building along the west side of a cobbled courtyard. The ground floor of the building is below a white, plastered belt course rendered in a brown colour with sandstone framing around the windows. The main entrance in the bay furthest to the right is topped by a transom window. The upper part of the facade is constructed in undressed, red brick with a white sill course below the windows on the third floor, a white dentillated cornice and white, plastered framing around the windows. The yard side of the building is plastered and painted yellow. The pitched roof is clad with black tile towards the street and red tile towards the yard.

The far end of the perpendicular wing is attached to an L-shaped warehouse. It features a wall dormer with a pulley beam.

=== Rosenborggade 9/Tornebuskegade 1 ===
Rosenborggade 9 is constructed with five storeys over a walk-out basement. The facade is rendered in a pale yellow colour. It is divided horizontally by a narrow belt course above the ground floor and sill courses below the windows on the first and fourth floors. The facade is finished by a cornice supported by corbels. The facade towards Rosenborggade is nine bays long and the one towards Tornebuskegade is six bays long. The main entrance is located in the centre of the facade towards Rosenborggade. A gate in Tornebuskegade opens to the cobbled courtyard.

== Today ==
The property is owned by E/F Rosenborggade 7–9. The two lower floors of No. 9 have been converted into commercial spaces. The warehouse in the courtyard has also been converted into office space.

== Gallery ==
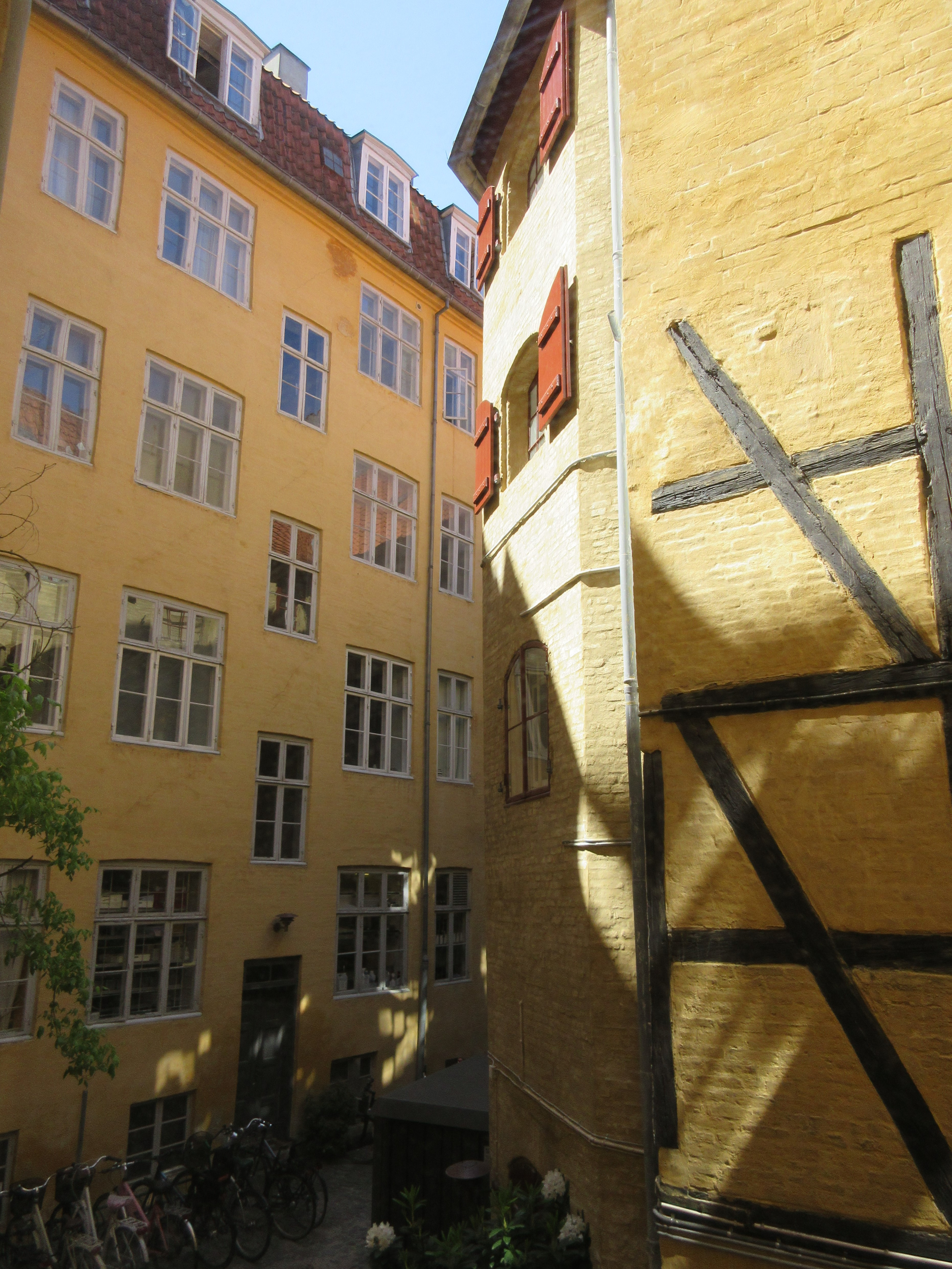
Side wing of Rosenborggade 8 and the chamfered corner of the warehouse

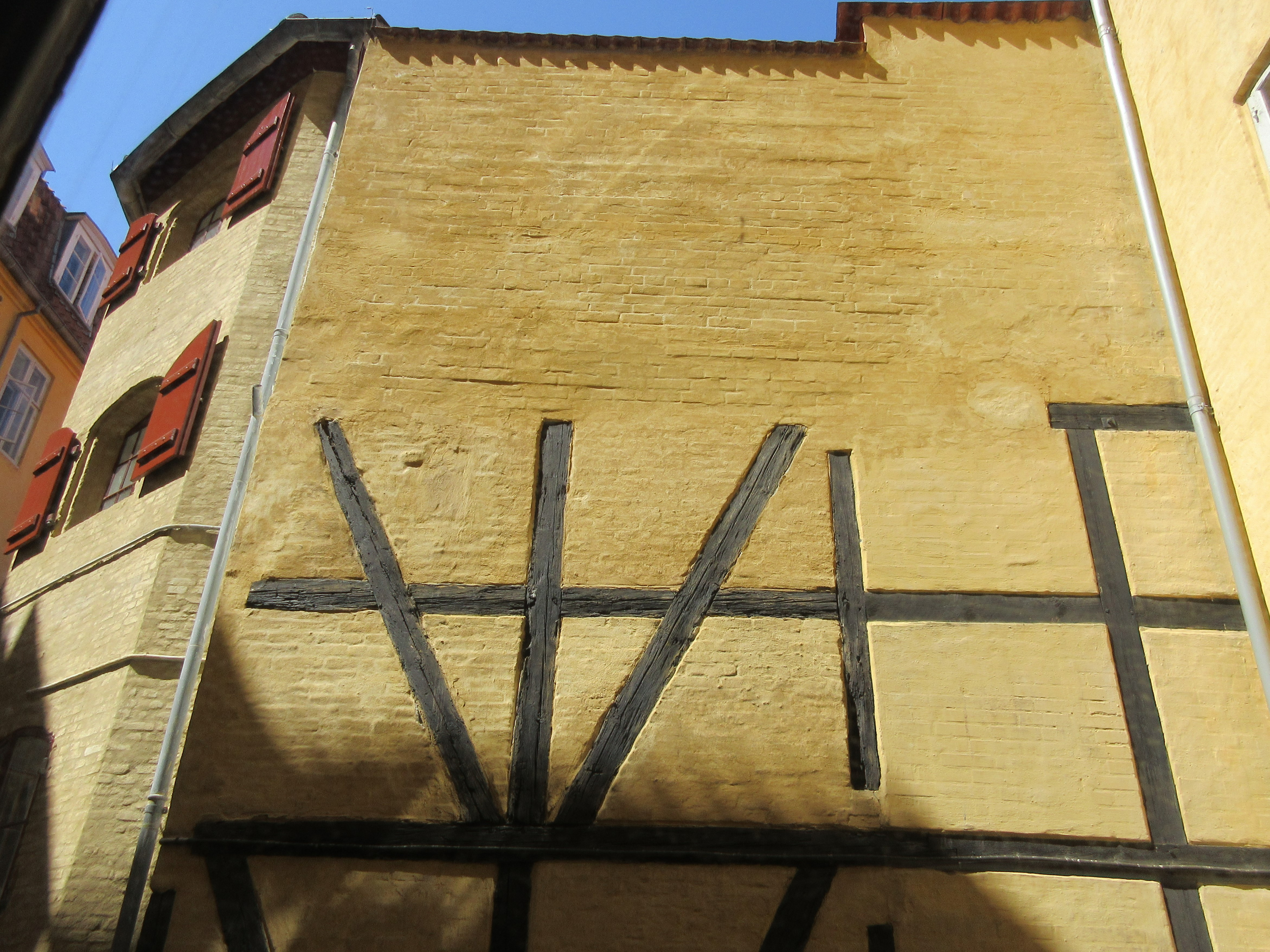
Gable of the warehouse in the courtyard

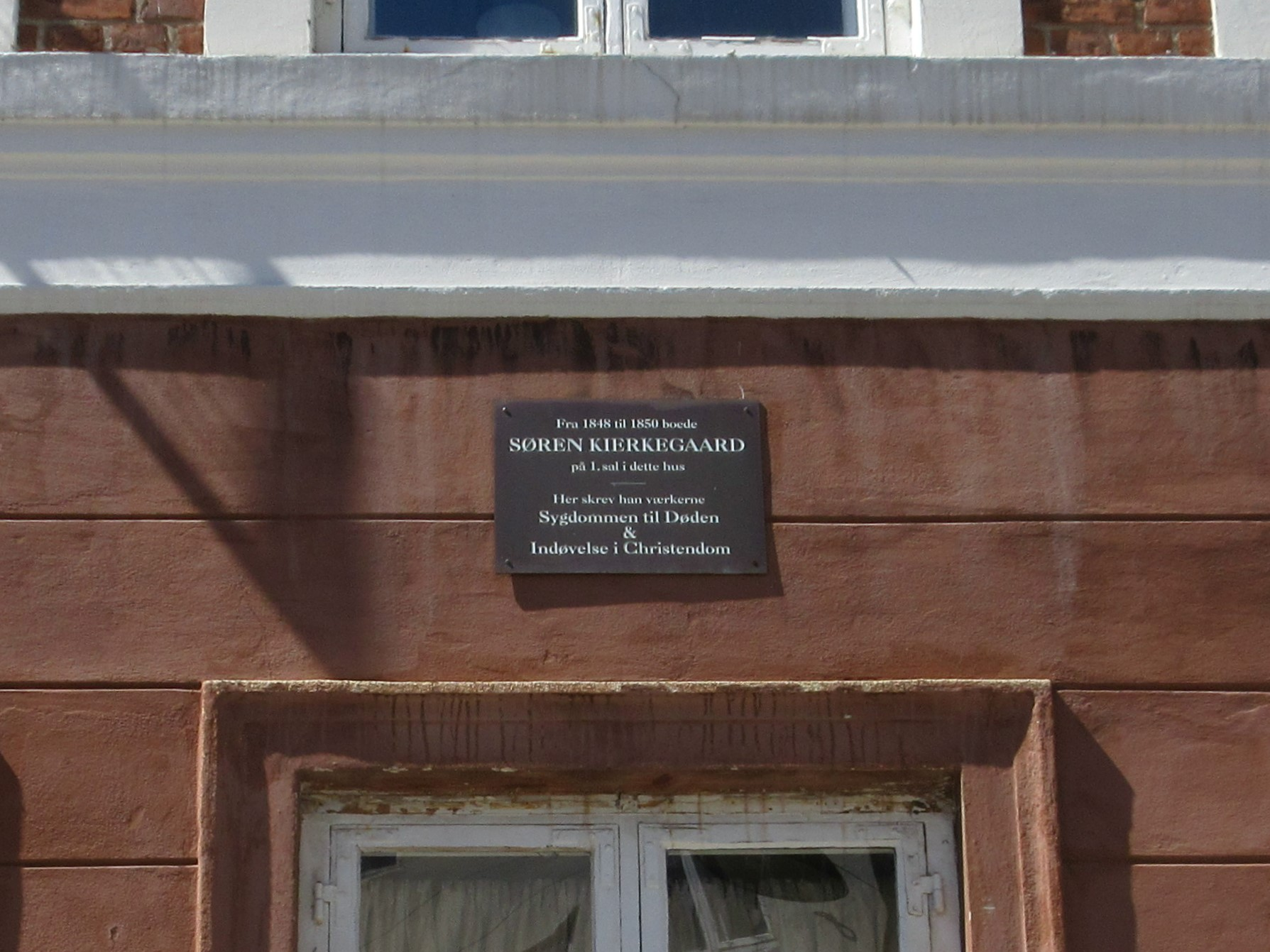
Søren Kierkegaard plaque
