= White Lighter =

Studio album by Typhoon
- Released: August 20, 2013
- Recorded: January 2012 – February 2013
- Studio: Pendarvis Farm
- Genre: Indie rock
- Length: 46:11
- Label: Roll Call
- Producer: Paul Laxer

Typhoon chronology
Hunger and Thirst (2010)	White Lighter (2013)	Offerings (2018)

White Lighter is the third studio album by American indie rock band Typhoon. It was released in August 2013 and was their first studio album after the band signed with Roll Call Records.

== Background ==
Typhoon front-man, Kyle Morton, wrote and composed all the songs on the album. As a child, Morton had a life threatening case of Lyme disease and suffered multiple organ failures. Ultimately he received a kidney transplant from his father, but he lost most of his childhood to the illness. The album is a mixture of darkness hopelessness along with wanting for more and uplifting melodies. At a concert in Boston, Morton shared the story behind the song named after a dilemma that shares his name, Morton's fork, which Morton explained as being "paralyzed by two equally bad choices," a situation he faced in his own past.

== Reception ==
Professional ratings
Review scores
Source	Rating
AllMusic	4/5 stars
American Songwriter	3.5/5 stars
EarBuddy	8.4/10 stars

White Lighter was received with critical success. In regards to the band's sound and size, Hilary Saunders of Paste Magazine said "The band’s comparatively enormous size—marked by a horn section, string section and eclectic percussion—naturally exudes a boisterous optimism and familial charm." Jonathan Doyle of the New Welsh Review said that for Morton, "For him, this fear is not vanity in the face of impermanence but rather an attempt to make sense of time we have had and still have."

== Track listing ==
No.	Title	Writer(s)	Producer(s)	Length
1.	"Prelude"	Kyle Morton	Paul Laxer	0:17
2.	"Artificial Light"	Kyle Morton	Paul Laxer	5:35
3.	"Young Fathers"	Kyle Morton	Paul Laxer	4:27
4.	"Morton's Fork"	Kyle Morton	Paul Laxer	3:22
5.	"Possible Deaths"	Kyle Morton	Paul Laxer	2:09
6.	"The Lake"	Kyle Morton	Paul Laxer	3:21
7.	"Dreams of Cannibalism"	Kyle Morton	Paul Laxer	3:24
8.	"100 Years"	Kyle Morton	Paul Laxer	3:05
9.	"Prosthetic Love"	Kyle Morton	Paul Laxer	4:03
10.	"Hunger and Thirst"	Kyle Morton	Paul Laxer	5:22
11.	"Caesar"	Kyle Morton	Paul Laxer	0:53
12.	"Common Sentiments"	Kyle Morton	Paul Laxer	4:36
13.	"Post Script"	Kyle Morton	Paul Laxer	6:07
Total length:				46:41

== Release history ==
Country	Date	Label	Format	Catalog no.
United States	August 20, 2013	Roll Call	Digital	—
United States	August 20, 2013	Maple Music Recordings/Roll Call	Digital	MRCD4860
United States	August 20, 2013	Maple Music Recordings	CD	MRCD 6553
United States	August 20, 2013	Roll Call	CD	ROL2-2386
United States	August 20, 2013	Maple Music Recordings/Roll Call	LP	RCRLP 009
United States	January 26, 2018	Roll Call Records	LP	99961

== Credits ==
=== Personnel ===
- Kyle Morton – lead vocals, piano, guitar
- Toby Tanabe – bass, vocals
- Dave Hall – guitar, vocals
- Shannon Steele – violin, vocals
- Jen Hufnagel – violin, vocals
- Pieter Hilton – drums, vocals
- Alex Fitch – drums, vocals
- Tyler Ferrin – horns, guitar, piano, vocals
- Ryan McAlpin – trumpet, vocals
- Eric Stipe – trumpet, vocals
- Devin Gallagher – percussion, ukulele, vocals

=== Production ===
- Recorded at Pendarvis Farm- Clackamas County, Oregon
- Mixed by Jeff Stuart Saltzman
- Mastering by Dave McNair
- Artwork by Rick Delucco
- Design by Toby Tanabe
