= Offerings (Typhoon album) =

Studio album by Typhoon
- Released: January 12, 2018
- Genre: Indie rock
- Length: 1:08:34
- Label: Roll Call Records

Typhoon chronology
White Lighter (2013)	Offerings (2018)	Sympathetic Magic (2021)

Professional ratings
Review scores
Source	Rating
The 405	9/10
Sputnikmusic	4/5 stars

Offerings is the fourth studio album by American indie rock band Typhoon. It was released in January 2018. This was the second studio album released under Roll Call Records.

Morton described the album as being broken into four movements: Floodplains, Flood, Reckoning, and Afterparty. In a promotional tweet, the band describes the album as:

It's a record from the perspective of a mind losing its memory at precisely the same time the world is willfully forgetting its history. The urgent question becomes: without causality, without structures of meaning, without essential features of rational thought, is there anything that can save us from violence/oblivion?

With no past and no future, there is only suffocating, annihilating, present, looping on and on ad infinitum (to me, one plausible definition of hell) and the best you can hope for is that somewhere in the void there exists some small, irreducible certainty—a fragment, a kernel, something—that you may have the good fortune to stumble upon before it's all over.

You know, a boy/girl-meets-girl/boy-everyone-dies-in-botched-attempt-at-neo-pagan-sacrificial-ritual-on-global-scale kind of thing.

== Background ==
In an interview with Sound of Boston, violinist Shannon Steele explained that the album came out of a long break from playing live shows and the changes in the band makeup, noting: "One of the first songs that Kyle brought to the group to start working out was Empiricist. It had such a heavy, grungy feel that we all were really enthusiastic about." The record was produced by Morton, and features some of his field recordings.

== Track listing ==
All tracks are written by Kyle Morton.

No.	Title	Length
1.	"Wake"	3:49
2.	"Rorschach"	4:17
3.	"Empiricist"	8:35
4.	"Algernon"	4:19
5.	"Unusual"	6:18
6.	"Beachtowel"	3:22
7.	"Remember"	4:30
8.	"Mansion"	0:55
9.	"Coverings"	3:52
10.	"Chiaroscuro"	3:10
11.	"Darker"	3:54
12.	"Bergeron"	2:50
13.	"Ariadne"	5:54
14.	"Sleep"	12:49
Total length:		1:08:34

== Personnel ==
=== Musicians ===
- Kyle Morton – lead vocals, guitar
- Tyler Ferrin – guitar, piano, backing vocals
- Alex Fitch – drums, backing vocals
- Devin Gallagher – glockenspiel, percussion, backing vocals
- Dave Hall – guitar, backing vocals
- Pieter Hilton – drums, percussion, electronics, vocals
- Shannon Steele - violin, vocals
- Toby Tanabe – bass, backing vocals

=== Production ===
- Produced by Kyle Morton
- Mastering by Adam Gonsalves
- Mixed by Jeff Stuart Saltzman
- Artwork by Rick Delucco

== Charts ==
Chart (2018)	Peak position
US Billboard 200	183
US Top Alternative Albums (Billboard)	18
US Top Rock Albums (Billboard)	34

== Release history ==
Country	Date	Label	Format	Catalog no.
United States	January 12, 2018	Roll Call	Digital	—
United States	January 12, 2018	Roll Call	CD	RCR 117
United States	January 12, 2018	Roll Call	Vinyl	RCR 117L
