= Sympathetic Magic (album) =

Studio album by Typhoon
- Released: January 22, 2021
- Length: 39:27
- Label: Roll Call Records

Typhoon chronology
Offerings (2018)	Sympathetic Magic (2021)

Sympathetic Magic is the fifth studio album by American indie rock band Typhoon. Recorded in 2020 during the COVID-19 pandemic, it was released without any prior announcements on January 22, 2021. This was the third studio album released under the Roll Call Records label.

== Background ==
On October 29, 2020, six days before the 2020 United States presidential election Typhoon released the single "Welcome To The Endgame" with a corresponding music video directed by Danielle Sullivan.

The album was released without any prior announcements or marketing on all streaming platforms on January 22, 2021, with physical copy pre-orders being available on Bandcamp. In the album announcement, Kyle Morton describes the album as:

Small news in the big scheme, but we finished a record and I wanted to share it with you. I wrote all these songs while puttering around the house these past several months, because, what else was I going to do? The songs are about people - the space between them and the ordinary, miraculous things that happen there, as we come into contact, imitate each other, leave our marks, lose touch. Being self and other somehow amounting to the same thing.

Recording had to be adapted to the plague-times. I tracked the demos first and sent them out to the band. Then the improvised procession of friends dropping by my basement, one at a time, masks on. Other folks recorded their parts in their own homes with cell phone voice memos or GarageBand in the laundry room. Parts from the original demos remain intact. Like everything right now, it was all a little disjointed, but I think it came together in the end.

The record is called Sympathetic Magic and it’s a great joy to share it with you. To be honest, it’s a joy to share anything at all in these isolating times.

== Critical reception ==
The album was well regarded by NPR Music, The Current, and Paste magazine, with the latter saying "Sympathetic Magic appeals to both our desire for heartwarming, acutely detailed scenes and the untangling of complex emotions that can nag at a person" and NPR's Robin Hilton saying "…it’d be easy for music as conceptual as this, and as driven by big ideas as this music is, to take itself [too] seriously, and it never does. It’s always just pitch perfect”. Atwood Magazine praised the album for its production, arrangement, and memorability.

== Track listing ==
All tracks are written by Kyle Morton.

No.	Title	Length
1.	"Sine Qua Nonentity"	2:48
2.	"Empire Builder"	4:14
3.	"Motion and Thought"	3:08
4.	"Santos"	0:29
5.	"We're In It"	4:36
6.	"Two Birds"	3:03
7.	"Evil Vibes"	2:47
8.	"And So What If You Were Right"	3:58
9.	"Time, Time"	2:56
10.	"Room Within The Room"	4:04
11.	"Masochist Ball"	3:19
12.	"Welcome to the Endgame"	4:05
Total length:		39:27

== Personnel ==
=== Musicians ===
- Kyle Morton – vocals, guitar
- Shannon Steele – violin, vocals
- Alex Fitch – drums, percussion
- Devin Gallagher – kalimba, ukulele, glockenspiel, percussion
- Toby Tanabe – bass
- Dave Hall – guitar
- Eric Stipe – trumpet, vocals
- Pieter Hilton – drums, percussion, vocals
- Ben Morton – guitar
- Tyler Ferrin

=== Technical ===
- Produced by Kyle Morton
- Mastering by Adam Gonsalves
- Mixed by Jeff Stuart Saltzman
