= You Say I'm Too Much, I Say You're Not Enough =

Studio album by Estrons
- Released: 5 October 2018
- Studio: Brighton Electric
- Genres: Alternative rock; punk rock; post-punk; indie rock
- Length: 33:13
- Labels: Gofod; The Orchard
- Producers: Alex Newport; Steffan Pringle

Estrons chronology
She's Here Now (2016)	You Say I'm Too Much, I Say You're Not Enough (2018)

Singles from You Say I'm Too Much, I Say You're Not Enough
- 1. "Make a Man" Released: 4 December 2015; 2. "Drop" Released: 5 May 2016; 3. "Lilac" Released: 13 June 2018; 4. "Cameras" Released: 25 July 2018; 5. "Body" Released: 24 September 2018; 6. "Strangers" Released: 23 January 2019

You Say I'm Too Much, I Say You're Not Enough is the only studio album by Welsh alternative rock band Estrons. The album was released on 5 October 2018 through the band's own imprint Gofod Records in the United Kingdom and through Roll Call Records in the United States and was distributed worldwide by The Orchard (a subsidiary of Sony Music). The album was met with critical acclaim, receiving 4/5 star reviews from NME, DIY, The Independent, Dork and Upset Magazine. It was nominated for the Welsh Music Prize in October 2019.

== Background ==
Estrons announced their debut album, You Say I'm Too Much, I Say You're Not Enough on 25 July 2018 at the same time as their next single, "Cameras" which was taken from the forthcoming album.

A month earlier, they had released the album's lead single "Lilac" on 13 June. Huw Stephens made the single his Tune of the Week. Speaking of "Lilac" in a press release, vocalist and lyricist Tali Källström dedicates the song to "an encounter I had with a teenage girl in the early hours of the morning. I’d assumed that she was crying about something superficial and I’d also assumed that the man walking a few feet behind her was trying to take advantage. Turns out the man actually lived on that street and the girl was heartbroken because her dad had just been diagnosed with terminal cancer. We often get things wrong because society leads us to create prejudices on genders; the song is myself reflecting on that." The music video followed a month later on 11 July.

Their next single taken from the album, "Body" was debuted on BBC Radio 1 on 14 September by Jack Saunders. The music video for the track followed on 21 September. Källström told DIY that, "“Shooting the video for ‘Body’ was one of the most terrifying and liberating experiences of my entire life. For millenniums art has been used to set the paradigm for how our bodies should look. It suppresses us, it creates the unreachable which leads humanity into a pit of judgement, self denial and depression. This video is about studying the real. Celebrating yourself. Sexualising yourself, and letting go of the concept of “flaws” by flaunting who you really are.” The video was nominated for best editing at the 2019 UK Music Video Awards but lost out to Cellophane by FKA Twigs.

You Say I'm Too Much, I Say You're Not Enough was released on 5 October 2018 and was met with critical acclaim, receiving 4/5 star reviews from NME, DIY, The Independent, Dork and Upset Magazine. It was nominated for the Welsh Music Prize in October 2019 but lost out to Welsh-language post-punk trio Adwaith's debut album Meyln which was coincidentally Produced and mixed by Estrons' own Steffan Pringle.

On 23 January 2019 Estrons released the video for the final single from the album, which would also turn out to be their final single as a band, "Strangers". Featuring live footage filmed at their sold-out homecoming show at The Globe in Cardiff in December 2018, Källström said, "Strangers is about self-acceptance and finding the strength to grow and be on your own. The song takes us on a journey of self-sabotage, redemption, failure and success and how all of these experiences meld together to make us who we are."

You Say I'm Too Much, I Say You're Not Enough contains a re-recorded version of their song "Aliens" from their debut EP Whoever She Was which is also the track whose lyrics the album's title is drawn from. The album also contains two previously released singles; live favourites "Make a Man" and "Drop".

"Make a Man" was previously released in 2015 and received critical acclaim for its intense criticism of female objectification and toxic masculinity. Källström described it as ""the story of a heterosexual female’s battle between desiring a man, whilst simultaneously finding herself having little respect for his self-important ego and misogynistic attitude towards women. She retaliates by objectifying him herself".

"Drop" was previously released in 2016. The lyrics for the song were written when Källström ended up in a police cell. "I got arrested. And I was bored. So I just started reciting these lyrics. No wonder I ended up getting charged, they must have thought I was mental. I was fine in the end."

== Track listing ==
No.	Title	Length
1.	"Lilac"	2:38
2.	"Killing Your Love"	3:21
3.	"Make a Man"	3:06
4.	"Strangers"	3:37
5.	"Body"	2:57
6.	"Jade"	2:49
7.	"Cameras"	3:51
8.	"Jesus..."	3:29
9.	"Aliens"	4:01
10.	"Drop"	3:24
Total length:		33:13

== Personnel ==
=== Writing ===
- Lyrics by Taliesyn Källström
- Music by Rhodri Daniels and Estrons

=== Performance ===
- Taliesyn Källström – vocals
- Rhodri Daniel – guitar
- Steffan Pringle – bass
- Jake Greenway - drums (tracks: 1–9)
- Andrew 'Bernie' Plain - drums (track 10)

=== Production ===
- Producer - Alex Newport (tracks 4, 6–9)
- Producer - Steffan Pringle (tracks 1–3, 5, 10)
- Mixed by Chris Sheldon (tracks 4, 10)
- Mixed by Steffan Pringle (tracks 1–3, 5–9)
- Recorded at Brighton Electric
- Mastered by Charlie Francis at Synergy Mastering, Cardiff
- Griffin McCabe - Manager

== Charts ==
Chart (2018)	Peak position
Scottish Albums (Official Charts)	96
