= Magic Sword (band) =

American electronic trio

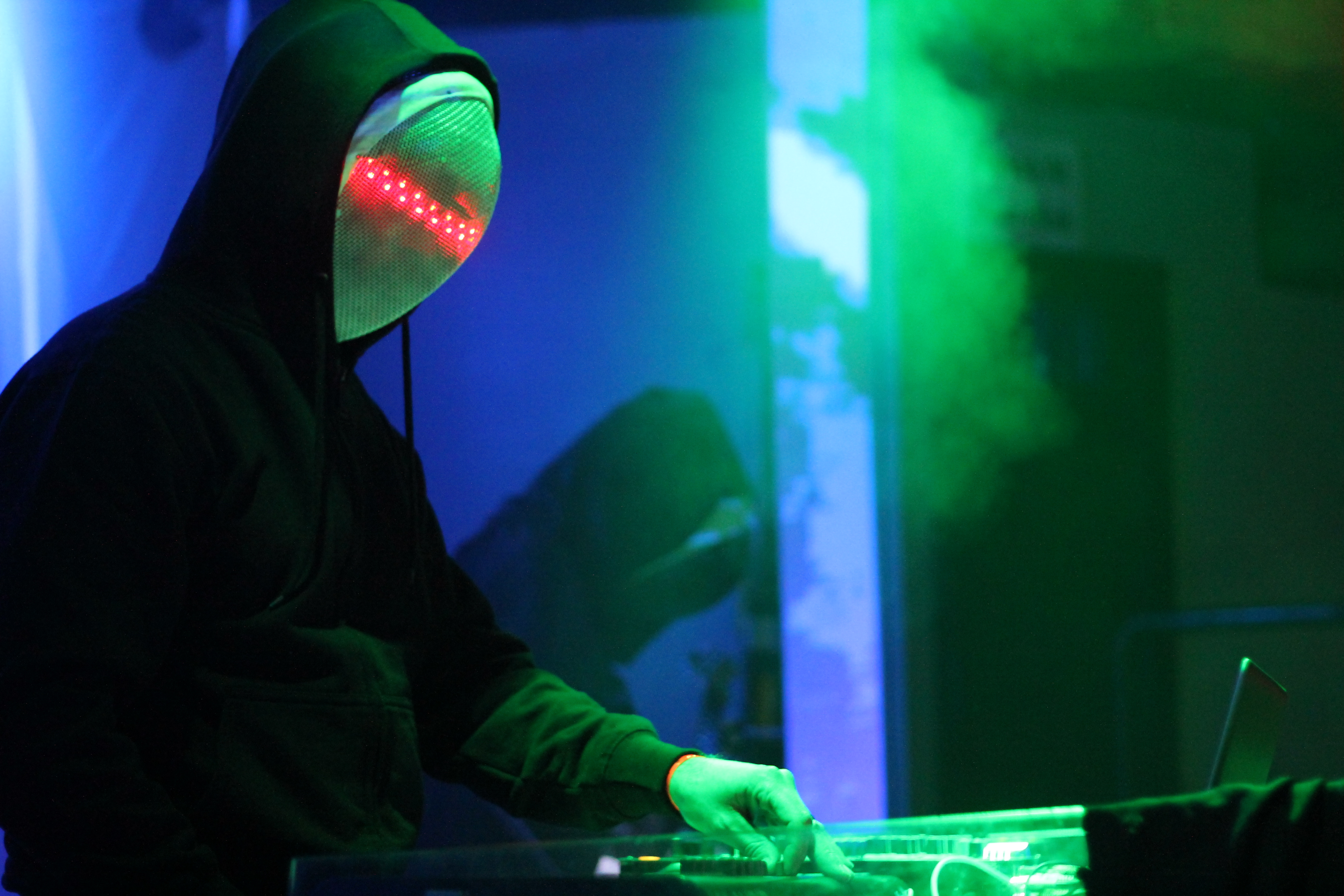
- Live at Treefort Music Fest 2013

Background information
- Origin: Boise, Idaho
- Genre: Electronic Synthwave
- Years active: 2013–present
- Labels: Joyful Noise Recordings, Size Records, Tender Loving Empire
- Members: The Keeper; The Seer; The Weaver
- Website: www.magicswordmusic.com

Magic Sword are an American electronic trio from Boise, Idaho. They are known for wearing cloaks and masks during their performances, so as not to reveal their faces or bodies. The band’s discography and other works revolve around a storyline surrounding the band members’ fictional personas, immortal beings linked to a magical sword.

The band consists of The Keeper (mask illuminated in red; keyboard, audio-visual), The Seer (mask illuminated in blue; guitar), and The Weaver (mask illuminated in yellow; drums).

== History ==
Magic Sword formed in 2013. That same year, they released their debut full-length album titled Magic Sword Vol. 1 in 2013 on Tender Loving Empire. Along with the album, the trio released a comic book with the same name. In 2016, the trio released their first EP on Size Records titled Legend. In September 2016, Magic Sword embarked on their first national headlining tour. Continuing their tour in January 2018 accompanied by artists such as Mr. Kitty, Nite and Ceegix.

Two of Magic Sword's songs, "In The Face Of Evil" and "The Way Home", are featured in the video game Hotline Miami 2: Wrong Number.

"In The Face Of Evil" also appears in the official trailer for the movie Thor: Ragnarok.

In 2019, Magic Sword signed to Joyful Noise Recordings releasing the Awakening EP followed by their second full-length album Endless.

== Discography ==
Studio albums

- Magic Sword Vol. 1 (2013, Tender Loving Empire)
- Magic Sword Vol. 1 (Deluxe Edition) (2016, Joyful Noise Recordings)
- Awakening (2019, Joyful Noise Recordings)
- Endless (2020, Joyful Noise Recordings)
- Badlands (2023, Joyful Noise Recordings)
- Singularity (2025, Magic Sword)
- Side Quest (2026, Magic Sword)

EPs

- Legend (2016, Size Records)
- Legend (Deluxe Edition) (2016)
- Awakening (2019, Joyful Noise Recordings)
- Zaros Returns (2025)
