= Radiation City =

American rock band

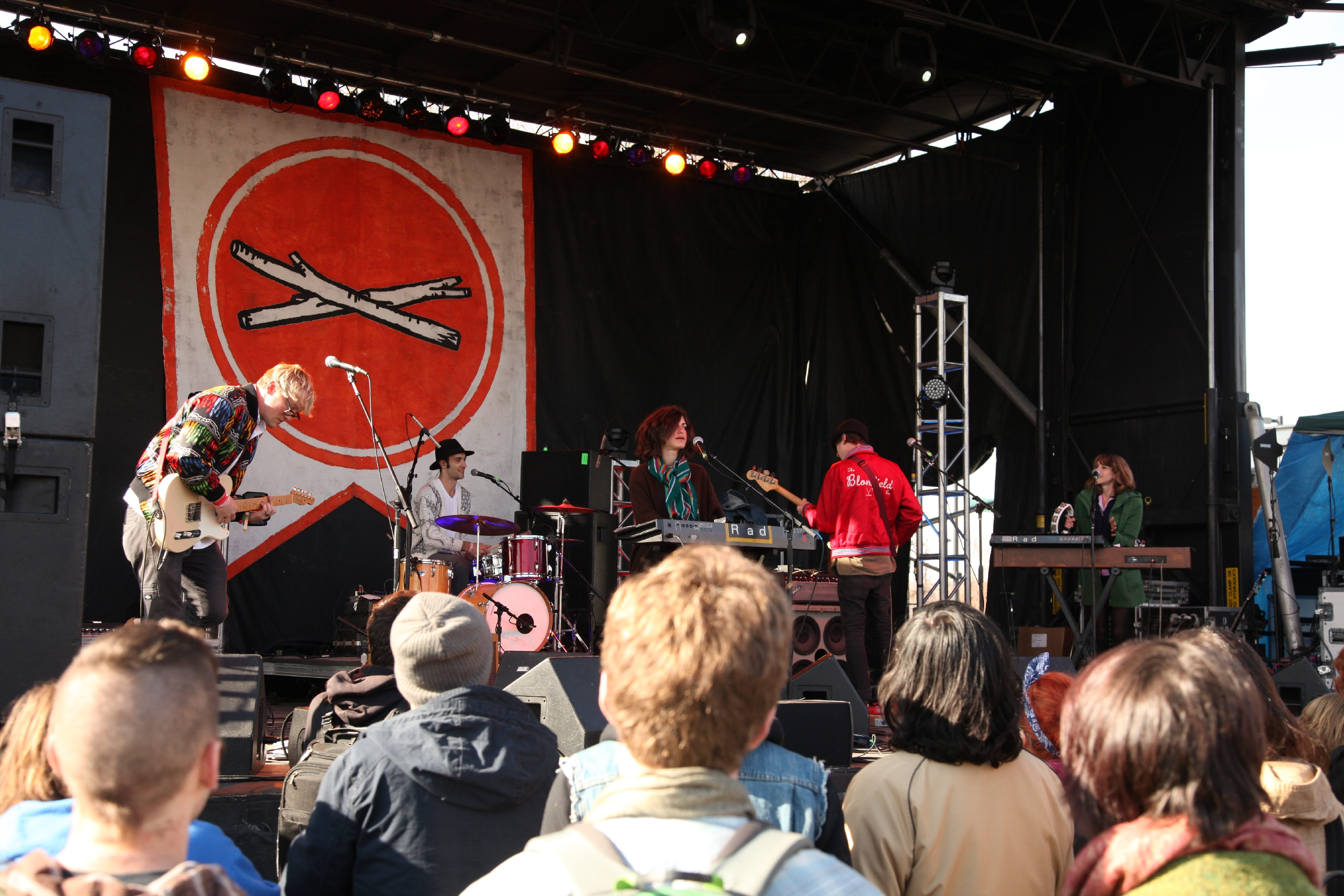
- Radiation City in March 2013 at Treefort Music Festival in Boise, Idaho

Background information
- Origin: Portland, Oregon, United States
- Genre: Indie rock
- Years active: 2010-2016
- Labels: Tender Loving Empire, Apes Tapes, Polyvinyl Record Co.
- Members: Cameron Spies; Elisabeth Ellison; Randy Bemrose; Matt Rafferty; Patti King
- Website: www.radiationcity.net

Radiation City was an American indie rock band that began in Portland, Oregon, in 2010. The band consisted of Cameron Spies (guitar, vocals), Elisabeth Ellison (vocals, keyboards), Randy Bemrose (drums, vocals), Matt Rafferty (bass, vocals), and Patti King (vocals, keys, bass). There were two couples in the band. The band released four albums: Cool Nightmare, The Hands That Take You, Animals in the Median, and Synesthetica. The band was signed to the Polyvinyl Record Co. label.

== History ==
Radiation City was initially composed of Lizzy Ellison and her boyfriend Cameron Spies, adding drummer Randy Bemrose for their second show, and bassist Matt Rafferty for their third. Their debut album The Hands That Take You was originally released in February 2011 on Ellison and Spies own cassette-only label Apes Tapes. After garnering interest through their live shows, they were picked up by the record label Tender Loving Empire and the album was re-released nationally on September 27, 2011. Time called this debut release "charmingly evocative". After the addition of multi-instrumentalist Patti King they followed their debut up with the Cool Nightmare EP released on April 10, 2012. A music video was recorded for the song "Find it of Use" from this release. Their second full-length album, Animals in the Median was released on May 21, 2013 to positive reviews. In 2015, Radiation City signed to Polyvinyl Record Co. and announced their third full-length album, Synesthetica. The album was released on February 12, 2016.

The band broke up in November 2016.

On June 22, 2018, the band released a final 6-track EP titled Coda.

A post to the band's Instagram page on January 23, 2024 announced a reunion show, to be played at Mississippi Studios on June 21, 2024.

== Discography ==
=== Studio albums ===
Year	Title	Label
2011	The Hands That Take You	Tender Loving Empire
2013	Animals In the Median	Tender Loving Empire
2016	Synesthetica	Polyvinyl Record Co.

=== Extended plays ===
Year	Title	Label
2012	Cool Nightmare	Tender Loving Empire
2018	Coda	Polyvinyl Record Co.
