= Estrons =

Welsh alternative rock band

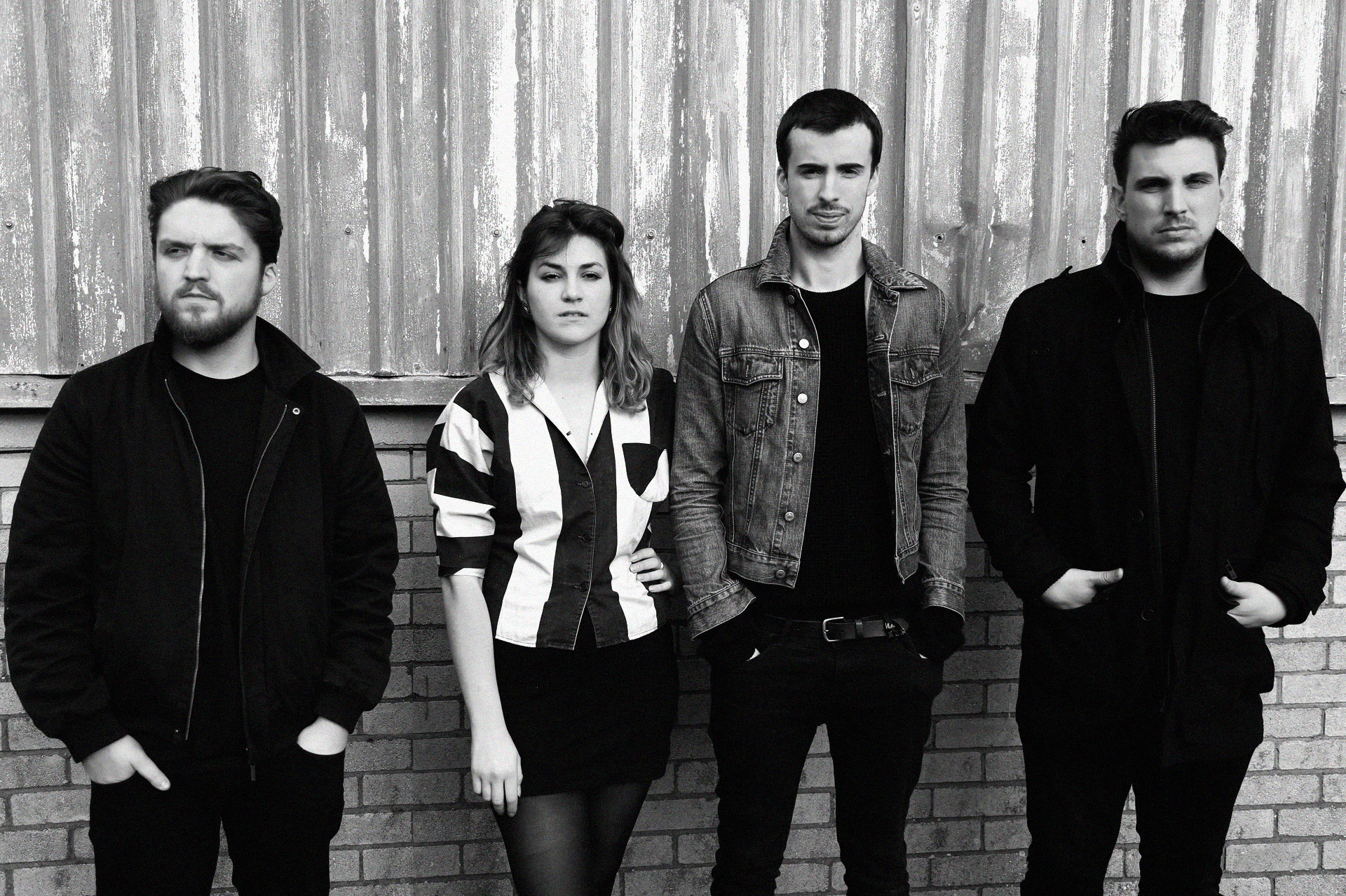
- Estrons in c. 2014

Background information
- Origin: Cardiff, Wales, United Kingdom
- Genres: Alternative rock; post-punk
- Years active: 2013–2019
- Labels: Gofod; Roll Call
- Members: Tali Källström; Rhodri Daniel; Steffan Pringle; Adam Thomas

Estrons was a Welsh alternative rock band from Cardiff, Wales. The band's final lineup featured Tali Källström (vocals), Rhodri Daniel (guitar), Steffan Pringle (bass), and Adam Thomas (drums).

They maintained a relentless touring schedule throughout their existence, alternating between their own headline tours and tours supporting bands such as Slaves, Honeyblood, The Amazons, Garbage and Pussy Riot.

Estrons's debut album You Say I'm Too Much, I Say You're Not Enough was released in October 2018 to critical acclaim and was nominated for the Welsh Music Prize in October 2019.

The band officially disbanded on 20 February 2019.

== History ==
=== Formation and beginnings (2013–2014) ===
The band's roots traced back to 2013 when Welsh-Canadian lead singer, Tali Källström, met guitarist Rhodri Daniel in Aberystwyth. After meeting, the two began collaborating musically, with Daniels writing music and Källström writing lyrics and vocal melodies, which lead to the creation of Estrons - Welsh for "misfits", "strangers" or "aliens". Together with their longtime producer Steffan Pringle who helped develop and hone their sound, the three formed the core of Estrons and after numerous lineup changes Pringle eventually joined the band as their permanent bassist in late 2016 (after a brief stint playing drums that summer). Even though they always recorded and performed live as a four-piece, this eventually led to the band being referred to as a trio in the press release for their debut album, the liner notes of which stated, "Estrons are Taliesyn Källström, Rhodri Daniel, Steffan Pringle".

=== "Make a Man" (2015) ===
"Daniel came up with [the music for] their garage-pop 2015 breakout song 'Make A Man' while standing between two sound-clashing rooms in a Berlin nightclub; Källström wrote the lusty lyrics as an attempt to bring the forthright sexuality of female rappers like Missy Elliott into the rock sphere." The song was first released on the band's SoundCloud account on 25 September 2015, while the music video was premiered by Noisey on 3 November 2015. On 4 December 2015 the song was released as a single.

=== "Drop" and She's Here Now (2016) ===
In March 2016 Estrons headlined the BBC Music Introducing stage at South by Southwest in Austin, Texas, United States.

"Drop", the band's second single came out on the band's SoundCloud on 7 April 2016. The lyrics for the song were written when Källström ended up in a police cell. "I got arrested. And I was bored. So I just started reciting these lyrics. No wonder I ended up getting charged, they must have thought I was mental. I was fine in the end." "Drop" was released as a standalone digital single on 5 May 2016 and was subsequently released as a 7" single by Flying Vinyl with previous single "Make a Man" on the B-side.

On 26 August 2016 it was announced that Estrons would be supporting Slaves on their Back in the Van Tour in September.

They released their next single, "Not Your Girl" on 14 October 2016 and announced their forthcoming extended play, She's Here Now. NME described the track as, "Intense, bold and catchy, it's Estrons' finest moment to date."

Estrons released She's Here Now on 11 November 2016. The EP was described by Noisey as "blistering", and that the songs "don't skirt around their topics—they dive into them head first like a rugby player hurtling towards a kebab shop".

=== "Strobe Lights", "Glasgow Kisses" and "Cold Wash" (2017) ===
Honeyblood announced on 27 February 2017 that Estrons would be supporting them for various dates on their tour in April, May and June.

On 5 April 2017 the Amazons announced that Estrons would be supporting them on tour for two weeks.

The band released their next single, "Strobe Lights" on 28 April 2017. The music video was released on their Vevo page on 5 June 2017 and was premiered by DIY magazine on 6 June 2017. Källström told DIY that, "The song is about the competition between jealousy and love and the catastrophe that happens when a certain one conquers the other." They concluded the year with a headline tour in September and October.

In August 2017 Estrons released "Glasgow Kisses", the first track of a double A-side single. The second track, "Cold Wash" was released in September 2017. A video for "Glasgow Kisses" followed in October 2017.

Flying Vinyl also released a double A-side 7" vinyl in August containing "Strobe Lights" and "Glasgow Kisses".

=== You Say I'm Too Much, I Say You're Not Enough (2018) ===
Estrons began 2018 by announcing on 28 February that they would be supporting Garbage in September.

Their first single of 2018, "Lilac" was once again produced and mixed by Estrons' longtime producer and bassist Steffan Pringle and was released on 13 June together with an announcement for headline UK and European tour dates in September and November. Huw Stephens made the single his Tune of the Week. Speaking of "Lilac" in a press release, vocalist and lyricist Tali Källström dedicates the song to "an encounter I had with a teenage girl in the early hours of the morning. I'd assumed that she was crying about something superficial and I'd also assumed that the man walking a few feet behind her was trying to take advantage. Turns out the man actually lived on that street and the girl was heartbroken because her dad had just been diagnosed with terminal cancer. We often get things wrong because society leads us to create prejudices on genders; the song is myself reflecting on that." The music video followed a month later on 11 July.

The band announced their debut album, You Say I'm Too Much, I Say You're Not Enough on 25 July 2018 as well as their next single, "Cameras".

On 10 August 2018 the band announced that they would be supporting Pussy Riot for all six nights of their Edinburgh Festival Fringe residency at Summerhall from 13 – 18 August.

Their next single "Body" was debuted on BBC Radio 1 on 14 September by Jack Saunders. The music video for the track followed on 21 September. Källström told DIY that, "Shooting the video for 'Body' was one of the most terrifying and liberating experiences of my entire life. For millenniums art has been used to set the paradigm for how our bodies should look. It suppresses us, it creates the unreachable which leads humanity into a pit of judgement, self denial and depression. This video is about studying the real. Celebrating yourself. Sexualising yourself, and letting go of the concept of 'flaws' by flaunting who you really are." The video was nominated for best editing at the 2019 UK Music Video Awards but lost out to "Cellophane" by FKA Twigs.

You Say I'm Too Much, I Say You're Not Enough was released on 5 October 2018 through the band's own imprint Gofod Records, licensed to Roll Call Records for release in the US and was distributed worldwide by the Orchard (a subsidiary of Sony Music). The album was met with critical acclaim, receiving 4/5 star reviews from NME, DIY, The Independent, Dork and Upset Magazine. It was nominated for the Welsh Music Prize in October 2019 but lost out to Welsh-language post-punk trio Adwaith's debut album Melyn which was coincidentally produced and mixed by Estrons' own Steffan Pringle.

In December 2018 Källström, together with Queen Kwong contributed to an article by Roisin O'Connor in The Independent titled "Why Matty Healy got it so wrong about rock, hip hop, drugs and misogyny."

=== "Strangers" and breakup (2019) ===
Ahead of a week of headline shows for Independent Venue Week, on 23 January 2019 Estrons released the video for what would turn out to be their final single, "Strangers" taken from their debut LP. Featuring live footage filmed at their sold out homecoming show at the Globe in Cardiff in December 2018, Källström said, "Strangers is about self-acceptance and finding the strength to grow and be on your own. The song takes us on a journey of self-sabotage, redemption, failure and success and how all of these experiences meld together to make us who we are."

Estrons played what would be their final gig, a sold out show at Scala in London on 7 February 2019. Louder Than War's Andy Duke wrote in his review, "Källström's vocals are an outstanding force from the outset and cut through the trio's relentlessly powerful instrumentation like ANFO industrial explosives in a Welsh mine. Whilst leaning towards the more rocking end of the musical spectrum live, this is a band who embrace a melodic top line with Källström's varied delivery offering many different shades and feels across their 12-song set."

After six years, on 20 February 2019, the band announced that they were disbanding ahead of a UK headline tour which was consequently cancelled.

=== Post-breakup (2019–present) ===
In late 2019 Källström wrote and performed vocals for a track with Cardiff post-rock duo Right Hand Left Hand called "Chacabuco". The song appears on their third LP entitled Zone Rouge which was released on 15 November 2019 by Cardiff label Bubblewrap Records. She performed "Chacabuco" live with the band at both of their album release shows at Aces and Eights Bar in London on Friday 8 November 2019 and at Club Ifor Bach in Cardiff on Wednesday 13 November 2019.

Zone Rouge was nominated for the 2020 Welsh Music Prize which was not only the second nomination for Right Hand Left Hand (their first being 2016) but also the second nomination for Källström after Estron's debut LP was nominated in 2019.

Almost exactly one year after the release of Zone Rouge, a remix of "Chacabuco" was released on 12 November 2020, again featuring vocals written and performed by Källström.

Estrons' long-time producer and bassist Steffan Pringle continues to work as a producer, recording and mixing engineer based in Cardiff. He has worked on records by bands such as Future of the Left, Himalayas and Boy Azooga. He produced and mixed Welsh-language post-punk trio Adwaith's debut album Melyn which won the Welsh Music Prize in 2019, the same year that Estrons' debut album was nominated.

In late 2019 he also started a new band that he fronts called Death Cult Electric. Their debut single "She Comes Too Quick" was released on 1 November 2019 with a video following on 6 December. The track was played on BBC Radio 1 by Jack Saunders and playlisted on Radio X. A follow up single called "Deleter" was released on 4 June 2020 and featured drums recorded by Dave Newington from Boy Azooga. A music video was released on 24 April 2020. The song received a considerable airplay on Radio X by John Kennedy and was playlisted by the station for three weeks.

== Discography ==
=== Studio albums ===
- You Say I'm Too Much, I Say You're Not Enough (2018)

=== EPs ===
- Whoever She Was (2015)
- She's Here Now (2016)
- Estrons (2017)

=== Singles ===
- "Make a Man" (2015)
- "Drop" (2016)
- "Not Your Girl" (2016)
- "Strobe Lights" (2017)
- "Glasgow Kisses" / "Cold Wash" (2017)
- "Lilac" (2018)
- "Cameras" (2018)
- "Body" (2018)
- "Strangers" (2019)

=== Music videos ===
- "Make a Man" (2015)
- "Strobe Lights" (2017)
- "Glasgow Kisses" (2017)
- "Lilac" (2018)
- "Body" (2018)
- "Strangers" (2019)

== Members ==
- Taliesyn "Tali" Källström — vocals
- Rhodri Daniel — guitar
- Steffan Pringle — bass
- Adam Thomas — drums
