= Musée Mécanique (band) =

American band

- Origin: Portland, Oregon, United States
- Genres: Indie folk, prog folk
- Years active: 2006–present
- Labels: Tender Loving Empire, Frog Stand Records, Souterrain Transmissions, Glitterhouse Records
- Members: Micah Rabwin; Sean Ogilvie; Matt Berger; John Whaley; Brian Perez
- Past members: Jeff Boyd; Dave Depper; Andrew Zilar

Musée Mécanique is an American band based in Portland, Oregon, fronted by singer-songwriters Micah Rabwin and Sean Ogilvie. The band's debut LP Hold This Ghost was released September 30, 2008 on Frog Stand Records of Brooklyn, New York and in 2010 on Souterrain Transmissions of Berlin, Germany. The 2014 album From the Shores of Sleep was released by the Portland indie label Tender Loving Empire and in Europe by Glitterhouse Records.

== History ==
The band's chief songwriters, Micah Rabwin and Sean Ogilvie, have been writing and performing music together since childhood. Ogilvie used to be with San Diego, California post-rock band Tristeza. Musée Mécanique was founded in 2006 with the addition of Matt Berger, Jeff Boyd and Brian Perez.

== Hold This Ghost ==
The album was largely celebrated as an inventive addition to the indie folk scene. It was roundly praised, described as a successful and "delicate take on folk, meticulously arranged" by XLR8R. Pitchfork gave it 7.2 points, noting its "elegant clarity and regal sadness". Musée Mécanique toured extensively in support of Hold This Ghost, including multiple tours in both the United States and Europe. They shared the stage with widely celebrated folk acts such as Iron & Wine, Beach House and M Ward, and garnered critical comparisons to other important folk bands, such as Neutral Milk Hotel and Beirut.

The album was produced and engineered by Rabwin and Ogilvie and mixed by Tucker Martine, who has worked with The Decemberists, Sufjan Stevens and Laura Veirs. The song "Like Home" was featured on the internationally syndicated NPR show All Songs Considered on November 17, 2008.

Cover of Hold This Ghost

Track listing:

1. Like Home
2. Two Friends Like Us
3. The Propellors
4. The Things That I Know
5. Fits and Starts
6. Somehow Bound
7. Under Glass
8. Sleeping in Our Clothes
9. Nothing Glorious
10. Our Changing Skins

== From Shores of Sleep ==
In August 2014, the band released their second album From Shores of Sleep. The ten-song album was recorded by the band at their Wooden Fences Studio and it was released by the Portland, Oregon-based imprint Tender Loving Empire. The album was mixed and mastered by Tony Lash. As of October 2014, an instrumental version of the album is available as a digital download.

Track Listing:

1. O. Astoria
2. The Lighthouse and the Hourglass
3. The Open Sea
4. The Man Who Sleeps
5. A Wish We Spoke
6. Castle Walls
7. The World of Silence
8. Along the Shore
9. Cast in the Brine
10. The Shaker's Cask
