= The Sickness unto Death =

1849 book by Søren Kierkegaard

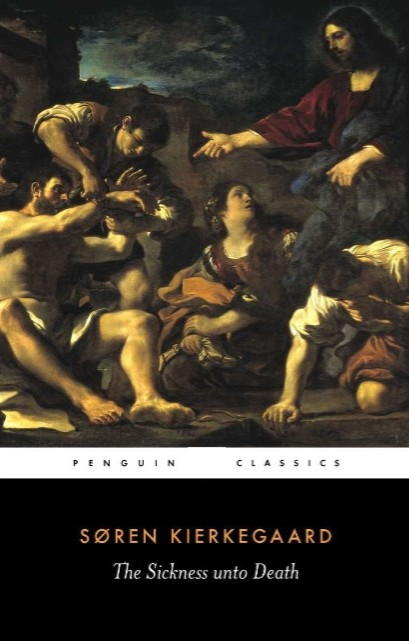
- Front cover of the Penguin Classics edition
- Author: Søren Kierkegaard
- Original title: Sygdommen til Døden
- Language: Danish
- Series: Second authorship (Pseudonymous)
- Genre: Philosophy
- Publication date: 1849
- Publication place: Denmark
- Pages: 265
- ISBN: 978-0-691-02028-0
- OCLC: 10672189
- Preceded by: Three Discourses at the Communion on Fridays
- Followed by: Practice in Christianity

The Sickness unto Death (Danish: Sygdommen til Døden) is a book written by Danish philosopher Søren Kierkegaard in 1849 under the pseudonym Anti-Climacus. A work of Christian existentialism, the book is about Kierkegaard's concept of despair, which he equates with the Christian concept of sin, which he terms "the sin of despair". Walter Lowrie wrote that he saw the themes in The Sickness unto Death as a repetition of those in Kierkegaard’s earlier work, Fear and Trembling, and as being even more closely related to those in The Concept of Anxiety. Kierkegaard used two pseudonyms for opposite purposes: "Johannes Climacus" suggests that he is not a Christian, whereas "Anti-Climacus" suggests he is "an extraordinary Christian".

== Summary ==
Anti-Climacus introduces the book with a reference to a phrase in the Gospel of John, 11:4: "This sickness is not unto death." The phrase occurs in John's gospel of Jesus, in which Jesus raises Lazarus from the dead. However, Anti-Climacus raises the question: would not this statement still be true even if Jesus had not raised Lazarus from the dead? While the human conception of death is that it is the end of life, the Christian conception of death is that it is merely a stop along the path of eternal life, and thus nothing to be feared. Rather, it is the inability to die that is to be feared. The real "sickness unto death", according to Anti-Climacus, is not physical death but despair—a kind of spiritual death, which stems from not embracing one's self.

According to Kierkegaard, an individual is "in despair" if he does not align himself with God or with God's plan for the self. In this way, he loses his self. Kierkegaard defines the self as the "relation's relating itself to itself in the relation", and defines the human experience as the tension between "the finite and the infinite" and between "the possible and the necessary". He writes that this tension is identifiable with the dialectical balancing act—the relationship—between these opposing features. Although humans are inherently reflective and self-conscious, to become a true "self" one must be conscious that the source and ground of this "self" is love, "the power that created it". When one either fails to understand the true nature of the self, or the true nature of the power that creates and sustains it, he says, one is in despair.

There are three kinds of despair presented in the book: one of them relates to being unconscious of having a self; another to not wanting to be oneself; and the third, to feeling that one is not oneself. He describes the first kind as "inauthentic despair", because it is born of ignorance. In this state, one is unaware that one has a self that is separate from its finite reality. One does not realize that there is a power that created and continues to create oneself, and accepts the idea of finitude because one is unaware of the possibility of being more inherent in selfhood. The second kind of despair is refusing to accept the self outside of immediacy; only defining the self in immediate, finite terms. This is the state in which one realizes that one has a self, but wishes to lose this painful awareness by arranging one's finite life so as to make the realization unnecessary. This stage is loosely comparable to Sartre's bad faith. The third kind is awareness of the self without a willingness to acknowledge the dependence of that self on love, i.e., the power that created one. In this state, one accepts the eternal, and may or may not acknowledge love, but refuses to accept the aspect of the self that is love. Kierkegaard describes this kind of despair as the most heightened kind, and labels it "demonic".

To not be in despair is to have reconciled the finite with the infinite, to exist in awareness of one's own self and of love's power. Specifically, Kierkegaard defines the opposite of despair as faith, which he describes by the following: "In relating itself to itself, and in willing to be itself, the self rests transparently in the power that established it." People commonly ascribe the name "God" to the "power that created" the self, but Anti-Climacus's text is more subtle than this orthodox viewpoint. Kierkegaard certainly was thinking of God, but what it means to have a personal relation with God, and how God is love are the real subjects of this book. While the book is, in many ways, a phenomenology of prayer, it is just as much a phenomenology of what a Romantic-despite-himself could offer to the future of human maturity by way of a relational view of the self as grounded in creative love.

== Relation to other works ==
The Sickness unto Death has strong existentialist themes. For example, the concepts of the finite and infinite parts of the human self translate to Heidegger's concept of "facticity" and Sartre's concept of "transcendence" in Being and Nothingness. Kierkegaard's thesis is, of course, in other ways profoundly different from Sartre, most obviously because of Kierkegaard's belief that only religious faith can save the soul from despair. This particular brand of existentialism is often called Christian existentialism.

Some have suggested that the opening of the book is an elaborate parody of the often bafflingly cryptic philosophy of Georg Wilhelm Friedrich Hegel; however, some scholars, such as Gregor Malantschuk, have suggested otherwise.

== In popular culture ==
- The Polish minimalist composer Tomasz Sikorski wrote a piece of music inspired by the work, which includes a recitation of Kierkergaard's text.
- The sixteenth episode of the anime series Neon Genesis Evangelion, "The Sickness Unto Death, and Then...", is named after the book. Much of the series' philosophical and psychological subtext is influenced by, and makes reference to, the pessimism of Arthur Schopenhauer and the existentialism of Kierkegaard and Jean-Paul Sartre.
- The manga Sickness Unto Death ("Shi ni Itaru Yamai"), by Asada Hikari, uses Kierkegaard's ideas of despair within a story about multiple personality disorder.
- In Thomas Bernhard's novel Extinction, the narrator describes having sudden urges to read The Sickness unto Death, and he ultimately scoffs at himself for the thought, given his proximity and the present circumstances regarding his mother's secret lover, who he simultaneously admires and is sickened by and is present in the same house in the days leading up to her funeral.
- Walker Percy's National Book Award-winning novel The Moviegoer takes its epigraph from The Sickness unto Death.
- In Paul Schrader's film First Reformed, Reverend Toller likens Michael's utter despair and sense that life is without meaning to The Sickness unto Death.
- The American indie rock band Typhoon included a song titled "The Sickness Unto Death" on their 2010 album Hunger & Thirst, with themes of despair and finding one's self in God.
