= Three Discourses at the Communion on Fridays =

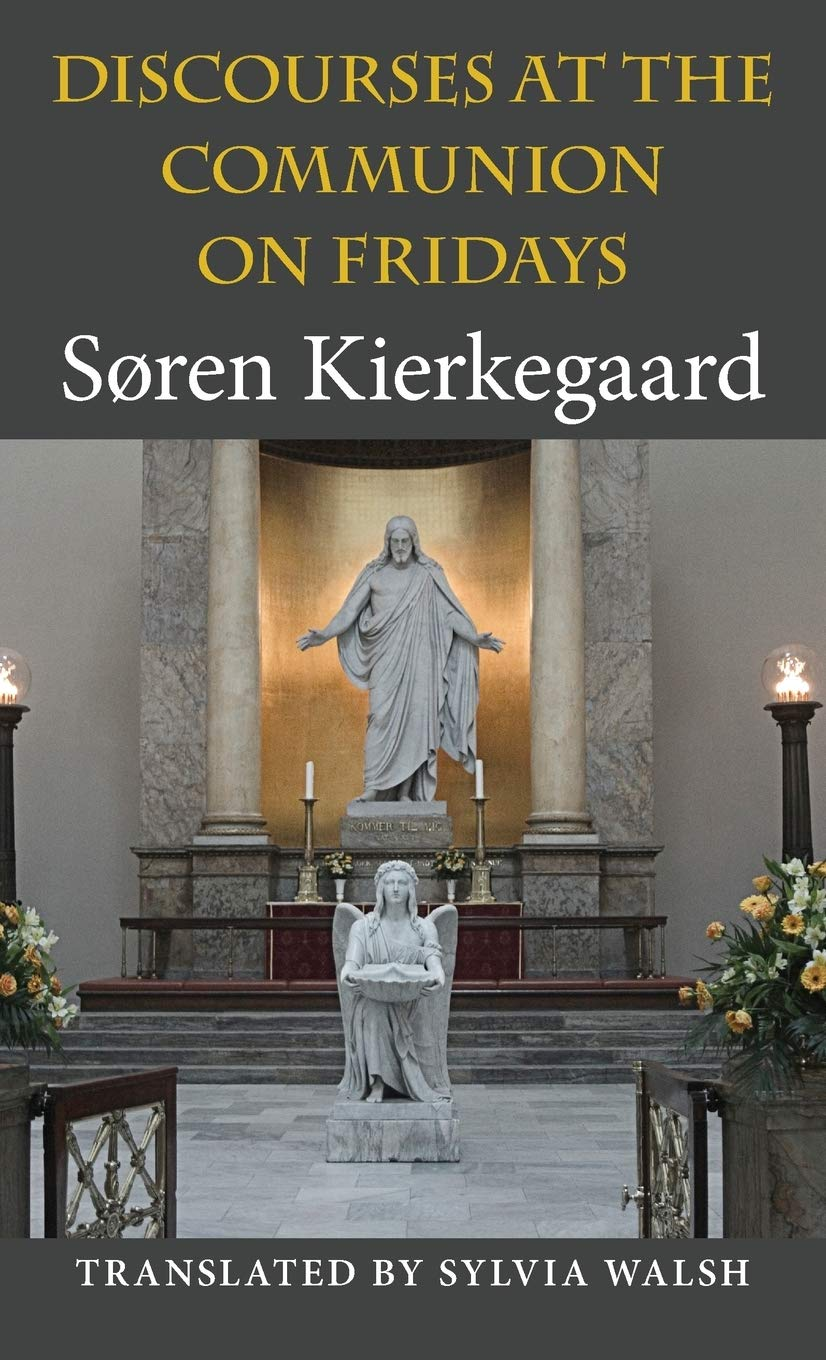
- Church of Our Lady, Copenhagen, where Kierkegaard attended communion
- Author: Søren Kierkegaard
- Original title: Ypperstepræsten, Tolderen, Synderinden, Tre Taler ved Altergangen om Fredagen
- Translator: Walter Lowrie 1940, Howard Hong and Edna Hong 1997, Sylvia Walsh 2011
- Language: Danish
- Series: Second authorship (Discourses)
- Genre: Christianity, psychology
- Publisher: C.A. Reitzel
- Publication date: Nov 13, 1849
- Publication place: Denmark
- English publication date: 1940 – first English translation
- Media type: hardback
- Pages: 27 of 168 pages
- ISBN: 9780253356734
- Preceded by: The Sickness unto Death
- Followed by: Practice in Christianity

Three Discourses at the Communion on Fridays is a book of religious discourses written by Søren Kierkegaard.

== History ==
These discourses are written with The Lord's Supper or Holy Communion in mind. Kierkegaard wrote thirteen discourses for Communion services from 1848 to 1851 and delivered three of them at the Church of Our Lady.

Sylvia Walsh notes that these discourses are designed to be read aloud, aiming to transform the discourse into a conversational format. She explains that the discourses were intended for Friday communions rather than Sunday services due to the smaller congregations on Fridays. The works were published under Kierkegaard's name and dedicated to 'that single individual whom I with joy and gratitude call my reader'. Walsh says, these discourses reach the decisive point of rest at the foot of the altar. These discourses deal with the forgiveness of sins and the power of love.

== Discourses ==
=== The High Priest ===
Kierkegaard asks whether its better to give than receive or if its better to receive than to give in his Preface. He's looking for the one who seeks his book, 'that single individual'.

The first discourse is based on Hebrews 4:15: "For we do not have a high priest who is unable to have sympathy with our weaknesses, but one who has been tested in all things in the same way, yet without sin."

Kierkegaard takes up the "universal complaint of sufferers: “You do not understand me, you do not put yourself in my place; if you could put yourself entirely in my place, then you would speak differently.” He points to the one who can entirely put himself in your and his place. Howard Hong said this discourse was related to the theme of The Sickness unto Death Kierkegaard has written in his Journal that the three Friday discourses were related to his last pseudonym, Anti-Climacus.

=== The Tax Collector ===
The second discourse is based on Luke 18:13 "And the tax collector stood far off and would not even lift his eyes to heaven, but beat his breast and said: God be merciful to me a sinner".

Kierkegaard writes about two individuals who went to the temple. But he inverts the picture. One of them stood before God and became "dizzy" and the other one stood before the "others" and learned "hypocrisy and pride". One was a single individual before God.

=== The Woman Who Was a Sinner ===
The third discourse is based on Luke7:47: "Therefore, I tell you, her many sins are forgiven her, for she loved much."

This woman with no name, who was a sinner, loved much according to Kierkegaard. He mentioned that "she hated herself:she loved much" several times in the discourse. He makes her a "guide", a "picture" and a "prototype" for his listener. She went to confession and “she sits at Christ's feet, anoints them with ointment, dries them with her hair, kisses them – and weeps.” She doesn't say anything, but she acts. And she is transformed and loves much.

== Reception ==
The discourses were first translated by Walter Lowrie in 1940, a second time by Howard and Edna Hong in 1997 (in the book Without Authority), and finally by Sylvia Walsh Perkins (née Walsh) in 2011. Each of these authors included them in books comprising many of Kierkegaard's discourses published between 1848 and 1851.

Gregor Malantschuk mentioned the relation of the single individual and Christian faith in 1963. "In Christian Discourses the doctrine of the atonement, the central thought of Christianity, is set in an existential relationship to the single individual. Kierkegaard stresses grace as the ultimate point of rest in still other discourses, which will be dealt with later." Kierkegaard stressed the importance of becoming the single individual in relation to Christ.

John Gates said, Kierkegaard “symbolically’ returned to the church in 1838 when he took the Lord's Supper as a “solitary penitent’ and in his last period of authorship ten of his fifty-two published discourses had to do with Communion.

In 1977 Simon D Podmore noted that, "Only Christ knows what true God-forsakenness means, as Kierkegaard counsels in his discourse on 'The High Priest': “surely no human being has experienced that spiritual trial [Anfegtelse], the spiritual trial of being abandoned by God—but he was tempted in that way”. Kierkegaard was sure that God never abandons us but we abandon him.

In 1978 Niels Thulstrup and Marie Mikulova Thulstrup discussed Kierkegaard's discourses in the same way Podmore did: "In the years 1849-51 SK also wrote a series of upbuilding discourses. “The High Priest’ — “The Publicans’’ — “The Woman Who Was a Sinner”, which are Three Discourses at the Communion on Fridays, published on November 14, 1849. The first discourse can well be said to be the high point of SK’s depiction of Christ. He is the only one Who has entirely put Himself in your place. He is with you in your many sorts of sufferings and trials, tried as He is in everything, though without sin, even in the temptation which has indeed never been experienced by any man, to be abandoned by God."

C. Stephen Evans said Kierkegaard's Communion discourses "Provided a deep and rich portrait of spirituality in the worship of the church."
