= Boy Eats Drum Machine =

American singer

- Birth name: Jon Ragel
- Origin: Portland, Oregon
- Genres: Rock Music, Electronic music
- Occupation(s): Disc Jockey, Vocalist
- Instrument(s): Phonograph, Music Production Center, Saxophone
- Years active: 2001–Present
- Labels: Tender Loving Empire
- Website: http://www.boyeatsdrummachine.com

Jon Ragel, better known by his stage name Boy Eats Drum Machine, is an American solo artist who was originally based in Portland, Oregon, but who moved to Santa Cruz in 2014. He has been described as "a DJ, vocalist and multi-instrumentalist, who uses his Boy Eats Drum Machine project to showcase his love of all things percussive."

== Discography ==
- 2006: Pleasure
- 2007: Two Ghosts
- 2008: Booomboxxx
- 2010: Hoop + Wire
- 2010: 20 Beats
- 2012: The Battle
- 2014: M1

A free EP called fre*e*p is offered to fans on the official website.
