= Hunger and Thirst (album) =

Studio album by Typhoon
- Released: May 18, 2010
- Genre: Indie rock
- Length: 43:16
- Label: Tender Loving Empire
- Producer: Draeger Gillispie and Paul Laxer

Typhoon chronology
Typhoon (2010)	Hunger and Thirst (2010)	White Lighter (2013)

Hunger and Thirst is the second studio album by American indie rock band Typhoon. It was released in May 2010.

This was their only studio album released under record label Tender Loving Empire.

== Background ==
Morton has said the album was influenced by the structure of David Lynch's films by having nice surface music but being much darker under the surface with his lyrics.

It took Morton about two years to write the album, and it was recorded in three to four months.

== Track listing ==
No.	Title	Writer(s)	Producer(s)	Length
1.	"Starting Over (Bad Habits)"	Kyle Morton	Draeger Gillispie and Paul Laxer	3:33
2.	"White Liars"	Kyle Morton	Draeger Gillispie and Paul Laxer	4:45
3.	"CPR/Claws Pt. 2"	Kyle Morton	Draeger Gillispie and Paul Laxer	6:59
4.	"Ghost Train"	Kyle Morton	Draeger Gillispie and Paul Laxer	2:58
5.	"Body of Love"	Kyle Morton	Draeger Gillispie and Paul Laxer	3:51
6.	"Intermission"	Kyle Morton	Draeger Gillispie and Paul Laxer	1:12
7.	"Happy People"	Kyle Morton	Draeger Gillispie and Paul Laxer	4:07
8.	"Old Haunts, New Cities"	Kyle Morton	Draeger Gillispie and Paul Laxer	4:38
9.	"Mouth of the Cave"	Kyle Morton	Draeger Gillispie and Paul Laxer	0:43
10.	"Belly of the Cavern"	Kyle Morton	Draeger Gillispie and Paul Laxer	7:11
11.	"Sickness unto Death"	Kyle Morton	Draeger Gillispie and Paul Laxer	3:19
Total length:				43:16

== Release history ==
Country	Date	Label	Format	Catalog no.
United States	May 18, 2010	Tender Loving Empire	CD	TLE024
United States	September 11, 2012	Tender Loving Empire	Digital	TLE024
United States	August 20, 2013	Tender Loving Empire	Vinyl	TLE024

== Credits ==
=== Musicians ===
- Kyle Morton – lead vocals, bass, piano, guitar
- Tyler Ferrin – french horn, trombone, trumpet, backing vocals
- Alex Fitch – drums, percussion, backing vocals
- Devin Gallagher – glockenspiel, percussion, backing vocals
- Dave Hall – guitar, backing vocals
- Grant Hall – mellophone, backing vocals
- Pieter Hilton – drums, percussion, vocals
- Paige Morton – violin
- Eric Stipe – trumpet, backing vocals
- Toby Tanabe – bass, backing vocals
- Nora Zimmerly – bells, backing vocals

=== Additional musicians ===
- Phil Gaudette – choir
- Olivia Miller – choir
- Anna Ottum – choir
- Danielle Sullivan – choir
- Erin O'Ferrell – violin

=== Production ===
- Mixed by Paul Laxer
- Mastering by Gus Elg
- Artwork by Rick Delucco
