= Typhoon (American band) =

American indie rock band

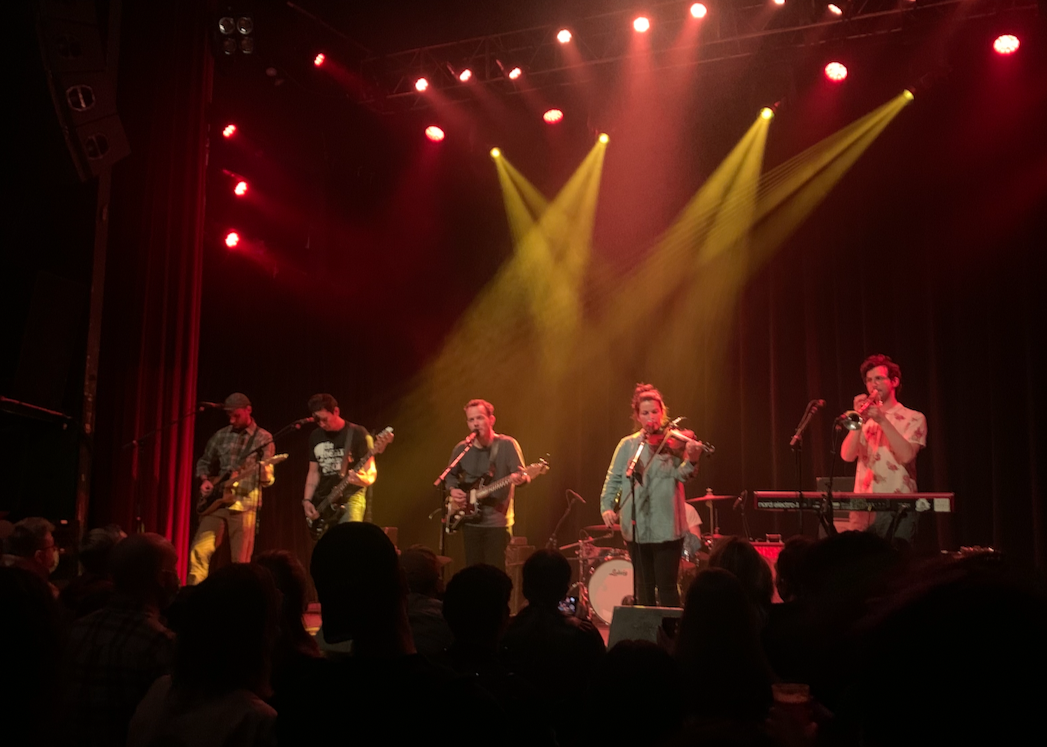
- Typhoon playing at the Gothic in Denver (April 2022)

Background information
- Origin: Salem, Oregon
- Genre: Indie rock
- Years active: 2005–present
- Labels: Roll Call Records, Tender Loving Empire, MapleMusic Recordings (Canada)
- Members: Kyle Morton; Toby Tanabe; Dave Hall; Devin Gallagher; Eric Stipe; Alex Fitch; Shannon Steele; Jordan Vale
- Past members: Pieter Hilton; Ryan McAlpin; Jen Hufnagel; Paige Morton; Nora Zimmerly; Grant Hall; Tyler Ferrin
- Website: wearetyphoon.com

Typhoon is an American indie rock band based in Portland, Oregon. Led by singer-songwriter Kyle Morton since its founding in 2005, the band is anchored by bassist Toby Tanabe, guitarist Dave Hall, drummer Alex Fitch, and violinist/vocalist Shannon Steele and has been noted for its large size, boasting up to fourteen members in its past. They have released five albums and two EPs, also contributing to a number of compilations. Their most recent album, Underground Complex No. 1 was released on April 15, 2022.

== History ==
Typhoon was formed in Portland, Oregon in 2005 by high-school friends Kyle Morton, Toby Tanabe and Dave Hall who had relocated from Salem, Oregon. The band's name, originally a working title, references a dinner conversation Kyle, Toby and Dave shared in Japan as teenagers. Typhoon's self-titled debut album was recorded and self-released in 2005. Over the following five years, the band was active in the Portland house party scene and incorporated new members from the Portland music community in its lineup. During this period, they released the Dearborn Sessions EP.

Typhoon released their sophomore album, Hunger and Thirst, in 2010. The album was their first to be released by Portland record label Tender Loving Empire. That year, Typhoon was voted number two on Willamette Week's annual list of the top ten best new bands in Portland.

Typhoon released the EP A New Kind of House in 2011 as a thematic companion to Hunger and Thirst. On August 4, 2011, Typhoon made their television debut on Late Show with David Letterman, performing "The Honest Truth;" the track was ranked #3 in Paste magazine's list of the 50 best songs of 2011. Their song "Prosthetic Love was featured in the Veronica Mars Movie. During this period, Typhoon opened for The Thermals, Quasi, Yann Tiersen, Explosions in the Sky, The Decemberists, Belle and Sebastian, and The Shins, and toured with Lady Lamb the Beekeeper. Their music later appeared on the SyFy series Being Human and the NBC series Chuck.

Typhoon released White Lighter in 2013 via Roll Call Records. The album, described as entrancing with uplifting melodies and dark lyrics, was recorded just outside the band's hometown in Portland, Oregon. It reached #105 on US Billboard Top 200 and #2 on Heatseekers. White Lighter was voted #28 on NPR's Best Album of the Year and #37 on PASTE Album of the Year. Their song "Young Fathers" was included in NPR's Best Songs of 2013 list and "Prosthetic Love" appeared in the movie Veronica Mars.

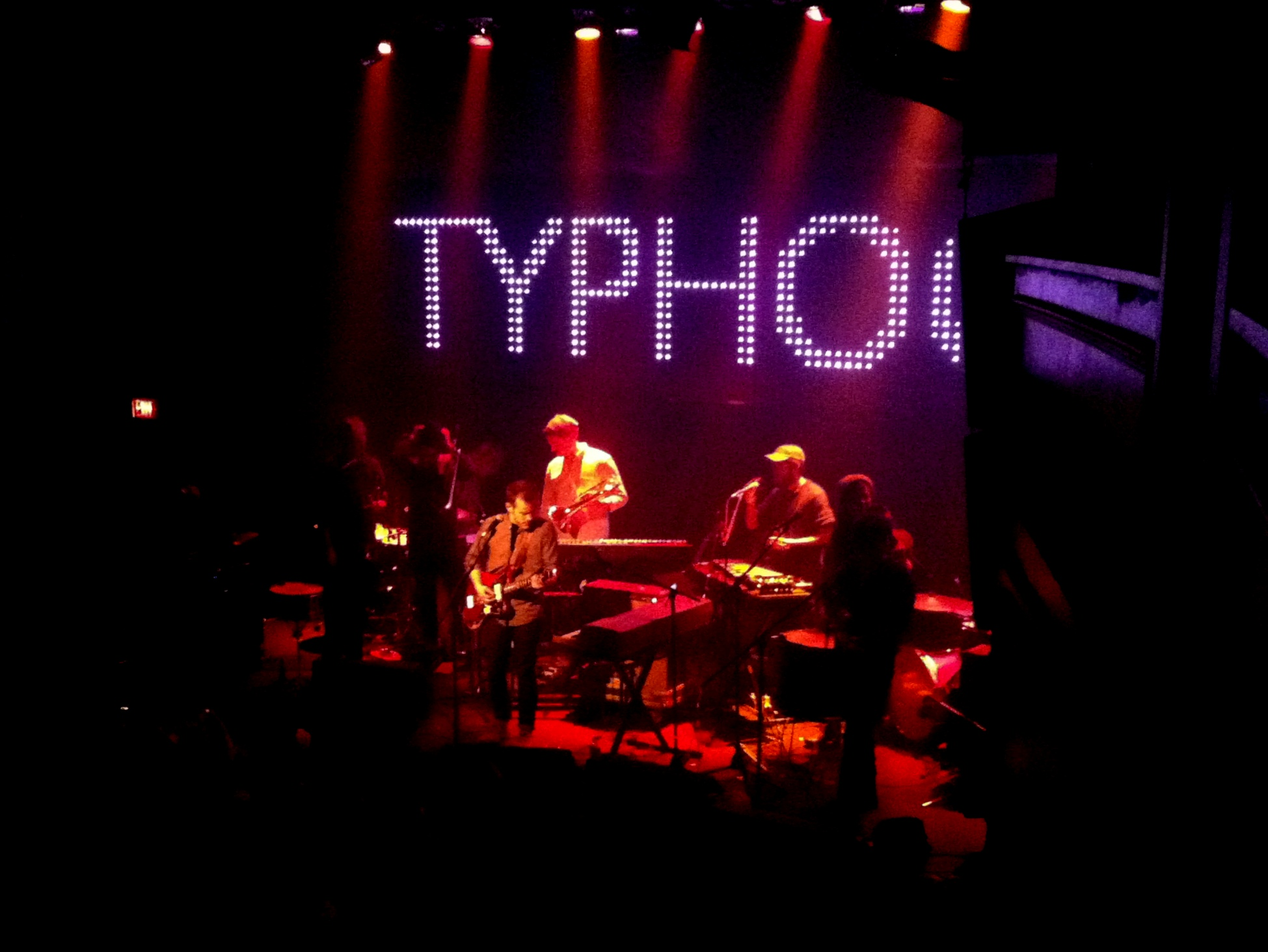
Typhoon playing at the Venue in Vancouver, BC, on January 18, 2014.

The band played the Lollapalooza and Outside Lands music festivals in 2014 and finished the summer with a tour with Portugal. The Man and Grouplove throughout August and September.

Typhoon released Live at Crystal Ballroom in November 2015 as a free download on Bandcamp and The album includes live performances of songs from White Lighter and the band's older album, Hunger and Thirst. A companion series of videos from the show was posted on YouTube.

On July 7, 2016, the band announced that they had begun recording of their next full-length album. During this period, frontman Kyle Morton released his solo debut What Will Destroy You and toured in January 2017. In September 2017, the band teased 60 seconds of a new song from their upcoming album and announced listening parties for October 2017. On October 25, 2017, the band announced their fourth album Offerings, scheduled to be released on January 12, 2018. The album debuted on NPR's First Listen on January 4, 2018. In an interview with Sound of Boston, violinist Shannon Steel explained how the band lineup changed since the last album: "As time passed, some members started taking root at home, choosing different careers, starting families, and going naturally in different directions. As a result we’ve had a slight personnel change. It worked out sort of seamlessly though because the songs that Kyle started bringing to the group had a much different energy to them than what we had come up with before."

On January 22, 2021, Typhoon released Sympathetic Magic without prior announcement, a full-length album completed during the COVID-19 pandemic, along with lead single "Empire Builder." Morton said of the album, "I wrote all these songs while puttering around the house these past several months, because, what else was I going to do? The songs are about people- the space between them and the ordinary, miraculous things that happen there, as we come into contact, imitate each other, leave our marks, lose touch. Being self and other somehow amounting to the same thing."

In 2022 the band released two singles "Mind of God" and "New Wife" for the EP Underground Complex No. 1 which released on April 15, 2022.

== Style ==
Typhoon's music is marked by complicated arrangements and careful orchestration. Live performances routinely involve twelve or more band members playing at once. According to Lauren Rosenthal at mySpoonful, "the group masterfully combines indie rock instrumentals and vocals with violins, percussion, hand claps, xylophone, horns and a choir of other instruments, making for inspiring and catchy songs." Their sound emulates and is sometimes compared to Frightened Rabbit, Bright Eyes, Beirut, and Arcade Fire.

The band's instrumentation is centered around a traditional rock configuration of guitars, keyboards, bass guitar, and drums and is complemented by brass, strings, and auxiliary percussion, among other instruments.

Typhoon's early recordings reveal a greater degree of experimentation with various styles, including a number of "sea shanties", country western and Eastern European-inspired songs. Their later output, including their album Hunger and Thirst and its companion EP, A New Kind of House, show a more focused and consistent sound, and a greater focus on creating a cohesive thematic through-line. Many of the songs are preoccupied with mortality and directly reference lead singer and primary songwriter Kyle Morton's own struggle with Lyme disease as a child.

== Band members ==
- Kyle Morton – lead vocals, songwriter, piano, guitar (2005–present)
- Toby Tanabe – bass, vocals (2005–present)
- Dave Hall – guitar, vocals (2005–present)
- Devin Gallagher – percussion, ukulele, vocals (2005–present)
- Eric Stipe – trumpet, vocals (2005–2016, 2020–present)
- Alex Fitch – drums, vocals (2009–present)
- Shannon Steele – violin, vocals (2009–present)
- Jordan Vale – trumpet (2021–present)
- Paul Laxer – producer, engineer (contributor: 2009–present)

=== Former members ===
- Tyler Ferrin – horns, guitar, piano, vocals (2005–2021)
- Pieter Hilton – drums, vocals (2007–2021)
- Ben Morton – guitar (contributor: 2020–2021)
- Ryan McAlpin – trumpet, vocals (2010–2016)
- Jen Hufnagel – violin, vocals (2010–2016)
- Paige Morton – violin, vocals (2005–2011)
- Nora Zimmerly – vocals, piano, percussion (2010–2011)
- Grant Hall – mellophone, backing vocals (2010–2011)
- Samantha Kushnick – cello, vocals (2010–2011)
- Jordan Bagnall – viola, accordion, keyboard, vocals (c. 2005)
- Casey O'Brien – drums (c. 2005)
- Conlan Murphy – guitar, percussion, banjo, vocals (c. 2005)
- Leah Ng – vocals (c. 2005)
- Gavin Pritchard (c. 2005)

== Discography ==
=== Studio albums ===
Title	Album details	Peak chart positions			
Title	Album details	US	US Heat	US Indie	US Rock
Typhoon	Released: 2005; Label: Boy Gorilla Records; Format: CD	—	—	—	—
Hunger and Thirst	Released: April 10, 2010; Label: Tender Loving Empire; Format: LP, CD, digital	—	—	—	—
White Lighter	Released: August 20, 2013; Label: Roll Call Records; Format: LP, CD, digital	105	2	23	34
Offerings	Release date: January 12, 2018; Label: Roll Call Records; Format: LP, CD, digital	183	1	3	34
Sympathetic Magic	Release date: January 22, 2021; Label: Roll Call Records; Format: digital; LP, CD (late 2021)	—	—	—	—
"—" denotes album that did not chart or was not released

=== Live albums ===
- Live at Mississippi Studios (Neighborhood Films, 2012), companion album to DVD of the same name
- Live at the Crystal Ballroom (Roll Call Records, 2015)

=== EPs ===
Title	EP details
June 2006 Tour EP	Released: 2006; Label: Boy Gorilla Records; Limited physical release
Dearborn Sessions	Released: 2007; Label: Boy Gorilla Records; Limited physical release
A New Kind of House	Released: March 8, 2011; Label: Tender Loving Empire; Format: 10-inch, CD, digital
Underground Complex No. 1	Released: April 15, 2022; Label: Roll Call Records; Format: digital; LP, CD (June 2022)

=== Compilation and split albums ===
- Split (2007) (split 7-inch with Lake)
- From Boy Gorilla and Beyond (2011), a compilation of songs released before signing to record label Tender Loving Empire
- Typhoon / My Body Remix (2015) (split 7-inch with My Body)

=== Singles ===
Title (A-side / B-side)	Year	Album
"The Honest Truth" b/w "Orange Peels"	2012	Non-album single
"Common Sentiments" b/w "Green"	2012	White Lighter
"Dreams of Cannibalism" b/w "Rules of the Game"	2013	White Lighter
"Young Fathers"	2013	White Lighter
"Thinking About You" (Frank Ocean cover)	2013	Non-album singles
"Prosthetic Love (Piano Version)" b/w "Beat & Weathered / One Hundred Years"	2015	Non-album singles
"Rorschach"	2017	Offerings
"Darker"	2017	Offerings
"Remember"	2018	Offerings
"Post Script" (East Forest Remix)	2018	Non-album single
"Welcome to the Endgame"	2020	Sympathetic Magic
"Mind of God"	2022	Underground Complex No. 1
"New Wife"	2022	Underground Complex No. 1
