= Tomasz Sikorski =

Polish composer and pianist

- Born: 19 May 1939; Warsaw, Warsaw Voivodeship, Second Polish Republic
- Died: 12 November 1988 (aged 49); Warsaw, Warsaw Voivodeship, Polish People's Republic
- Resting place: Powązki Cemetery
- Education: Higher State School of Music
- Era: 20th-century
- Movement: Sonorism
- Father: Kazimierz Sikorski

Tomasz Sikorski (19 May 1939 – 12 November 1988) was a Polish composer and pianist.

The son of the composer Kazimierz Sikorski, he studied at the Warsaw Conservatory with Zbigniew Drzewiecki. Later, thanks to a scholarship from the French government, he studied in Paris with Nadia Boulanger. From 1975–76, as a recipient of a Senior-Fulbright Scholarship from the US government, he worked at the Columbia-Princeton Electronic Music Center in New York City.

== His works ==
He is the main so-called "Polish minimalist" (the other: Zygmunt Krauze). In addition to piano works and radio opera, Sikorski composed numerous instrumental works, among them:

- Sequenza I for Symphony Orchestra (1966)
- Homophony for 4 Trumpets, 4 Horns, 4 Trombones, Piano and Gong (1970)
- Holzwege (1972)
- Vox humana for Mixed Choir, 2 Solo Pianos, 12 Brass Instruments, 4 Gongs and 4 Tam-tams (1971)
- Other voices for 24 Wind Instruments, 4 Gongs and Chimes, (1975)
- Sickness unto Death (Choroba na śmierć) (1976). The words are taken from Søren Kierkegaard's The Sickness Unto Death, 1849
- Music in Twilight for Piano and Orchestra (1978)
- Strings in the Earth (1980)
- Das Schweigen der Sirenen (1986)
- Diario (1987)

== Influence ==
In 2013, Bolt Records released a 2 disc album, V/A Solitude of Sounds – in memoriam Tomasz Sikorski featuring the work of Sikorski, as well as composers Szabolcs Esztényi and Kasia Glowicka. Within the album's release, Glowicka wrote of the composer: "Sikorski's minimalism was unique to any of these native and foreign influences. He was a philosopher-minimalist concerned with the meditative properties of his compositions. His philosophy could be as well paraphrased by Queen's existential Bohemian Rhapsody - "nothing really matters, anyone can see, nothing really matters..." On the other hand, literally every note matters in his distinct minimalist style. It is here that I've identified most strongly with Sikorski's longing for brutal beauty. In this space, one can go so far as to be intentionally painful."
