= Tender Loving Empire =

- Founded: 2005
- Founder: Brianne Mees, Jared Mees
- Distributor: ADA
- Genre: Alternative, indie rock, indie folk, indie pop
- Country of origin: U.S.
- Location: Portland, Oregon
- Official website: www.tenderlovingempire.com

Tender Loving Empire (often abbreviated "TLE") is an independent record label and local handicraft concept store based in Portland, Oregon. The record label side has established local and national recognition through a successful roster of indie rock and indie folk bands such as Typhoon, Loch Lomond, The Family Crest, Radiation City, Magic Sword, Y La Bamba and Willis Earl Beal. When the label partnered with Warner Music distributor ADA, President David Orleans called Tender Loving Empire “a major force in the vibrant Portland music scene”. Carrie Brownstein, of the band Sleater-Kinney and show Portlandia, called TLE in The Wall Street Journal a “dream boutique” for its collection of local artistry and music, both important to the indie rock culture of the Pacific Northwest.

== History ==
=== Founders ===
Brianne and Jared Mees met, as students of the evangelical Christian university Azusa Pacific, while studying abroad in Oxford and returned to LA together as a couple united by their many artistic talents. He published and wrote poetry and she hand-made purses and attended craft fairs; at one point, they were in a band called ‘Julai’ (later 'July' and the name of their daughter). However, the couple soon found themselves in the LA suburbs, sidelining their creativity in order to make rent. They opted instead to live in a tent on a house built on stilts in Panama for 4 months, a life-choice they have credited for the confidence needed to start the business.

Jared and Brianne settled in Portland, Oregon in 2006 after admiring the thriving music of Oregon on a roadtrip. There, they met other artists in the budding indie Portland scene and made important musical friendships with acts like Finn Riggins. It was a year later that they decided to establish a platform and storefront for both publishing small press books and selling their friend's records, calling it a tender loving empire.

=== Storefront ===
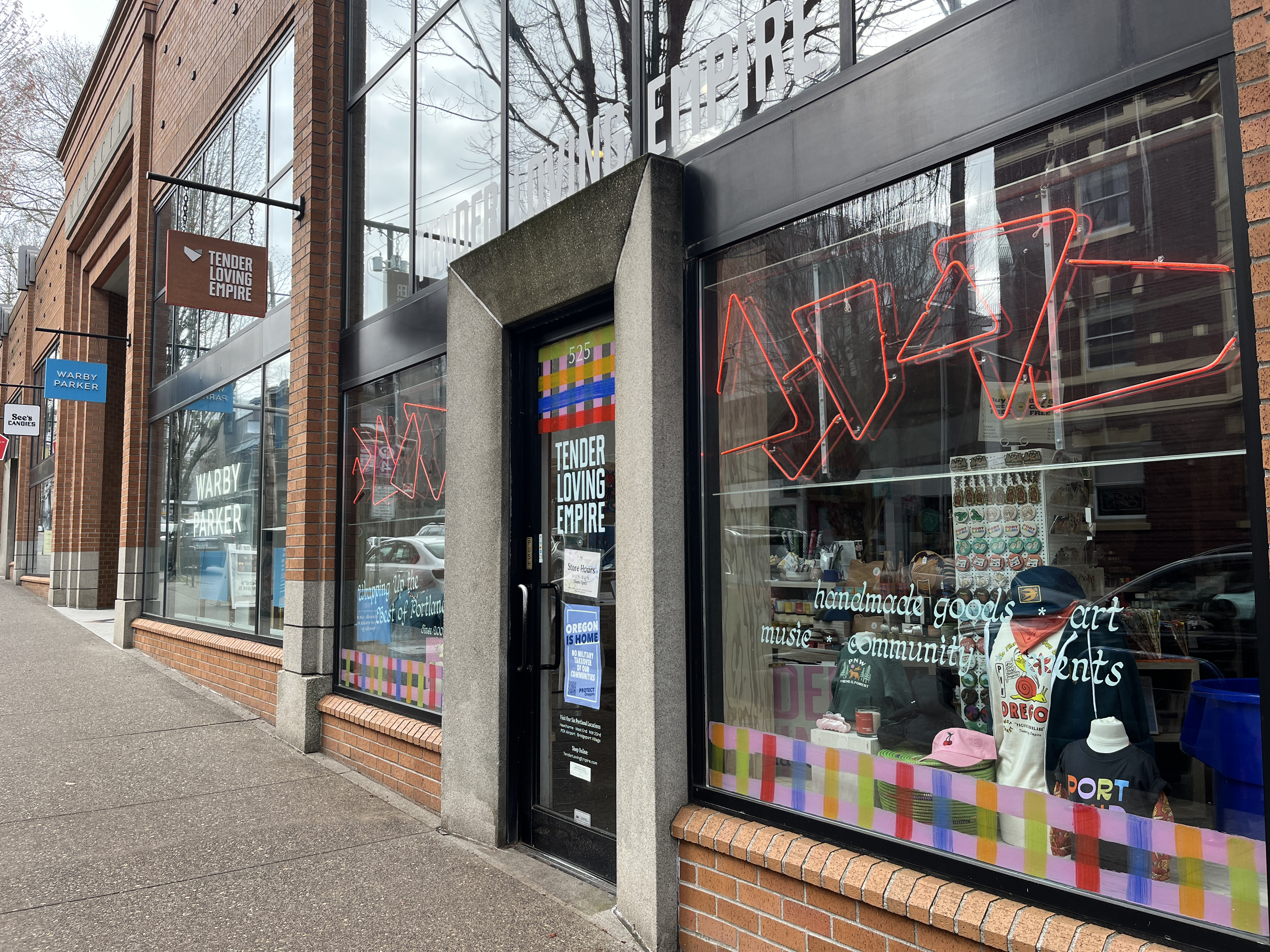
Tender Loving Empire, 2026

The first Tender Loving Empire storefront opened in June 2007 in Northwest Portland, selling music from the label as well as indie goods such as alternative comics, small press books, and other handicraft items popularized by the DIY aesthetic.

The stores have traditionally featured murals by local artists and are regularly decorated by local designers. Like the label counterpart, the TLE store has been nationally recognized as an important part of the Portland culture. Sunset Magazine said it was “the best example of a shop committed to local talent”.

In May 2010, the store moved from a small NW storefront to its downtown Portland location, near the popular Powells Books location in the West End shopping district of downtown Portland. In November 2014, a second location was opened in the Hawthorne District, and a third was opened in September 2015 in Portland's Nob Hill area.

== Record label ==
Tender Loving Empire was an idea born in a basement in 2005. By 2016 the label reached its 60th release. The bands on the TLE label are not defined by a single genre, but many are based in the Pacific Northwest.

Various TLE bands have reached a notable amount of national success while with the label. Typhoon performed CBS’s Late Show with David Letterman. Y La Bamba toured with folk-rock artist Neko Case multiple times after Case heard and bought the album in a Tender Loving Empire store.

In 2019, Luz of Y La Bamba was featured on Season 2 of the Storytellers Telling Stories podcast, and in 2020, the band appeared on Season 3 of Storybound (podcast).

=== Artists ===
- Andy Shauf
- Boy Eats Drum Machine
- Brainstorm
- Finn Riggins
- G_Force
- Hosannas
- Jared Mees & The Grown Children
- King Friday
- Loch Lomond (band)
- Magic Sword
- Museé Mecanique
- Slow Corpse
- Radiation City
- The Domestics
- The Family Crest
- The Shivas
- Typhoon
- Ural Thomas and the Pain
- Willis Earl Beal
- Y La Bamba

=== Compilation albums ===
Alongside traditional releases Tender Loving Empire releases various concept albums, such as the annually released compilation album ‘Friends and Friends of Friends’, which features locally- and nationally acclaimed artists.

=== Partial catalog ===
Catalog No.	Artist	Title	Year
TLE024	Typhoon	Hunger and Thirst	2010
TLE022	Finn Riggins	Vs. Wilderness	2009
TLE032	Y La Bamba	Court the Storm	2012
TLE038	Radiation City	Animals in the Median	2013
TLE045	The Family Crest	‘’Beneath The Brine	2014
TLE051	Magic Sword	Volume 1	2015
TLE058	Willis Earl Beal	Noctunes	2015

== See also ==
- List of record labels
- Indie Pop
- DIY
- Pacific Northwest
