= Practice in Christianity =

1850 book by Søren Kierkegaard

- Author: Søren Kierkegaard
- Original title: Indøvelse i Christendom
- Translator: Howard V. Hong and Edna H. Hong
- Language: Danish
- Series: Second authorship (Pseudonymous)
- Genre: Philosophy
- Publisher: University bookshop Reitzel, Copenhagen
- Publication date: 1850
- Publication place: Denmark
- Pages: 262 (Hong translation)
- Preceded by: Three Discourses at the Communion on Fridays
- Followed by: An Upbuilding Discourse

Practice in Christianity (also Training in Christianity) is a work by 19th-century theologian Søren Kierkegaard. It was published on September 27, 1850, under the pseudonym Anti-Climacus, the author of The Sickness unto Death. Kierkegaard considered it to be his "most perfect and truest book". In it, the theologian fully exposes his conception of the religious individual, the necessity of imitating Christ in order to be a true Christian and the possibility of offense when faced with the paradox of the incarnation. Practice is usually considered, along with For Self-Examination and Judge for Yourselves!, as an explicit critique of the established order of Christendom and the need for Christianity to be (re-)introduced into Christendom, since a good part of it consists in criticism of religious thinkers of his time.

== Themes ==
The book discusses in detail notions like "leap of faith" (or, to be more precise, "leap to faith") and "indirect communication". In other words, Kierkegaard emphasizes the idea that belief in God cannot and should not be rational in the sense that it cannot possibly be proved conclusively that God exists or that Christianity is true. In fact, Kierkegaard discounts the idea that a systematic Christian theology is possible. In this sense Kierkegaard (to the extent we could claim that he shared the views of the book's pseudonymous author) shared the anti-rationalist stance of Kant, the influential 18th-century philosopher.

He was fiercely opposed to Hegelian attempts to construct all-encompassing metanarratives. Kierkegaard attacked the notion, popular in his day in Protestant societies, that one became a Christian by simply accepting intellectually some supposedly rational set of proofs for the validity of Christianity. To Kierkegaard, this was the epitome of hypocrisy. He argued that Christ's words were merely a collection of unrelated parables with ambiguous meanings and not fitting into a coherent system. Even miracles like turning water into wine or even the Resurrection according to him do not conclusively prove anything but are simply a tool to attract one's attention to the need to decide, on basis of a "leap of faith", whether to believe or not. A "leap to faith" is necessary because God, as transcendent and "other", is unknowable, and any revelation to humanity can therefore only be in the form of "indirect communication".

The above ideas have been enormously influential in Western culture. They not only dealt a severe blow to the rationalism prevalent in Christian theology in the 19th century — and, in fact, still prevalent nowadays in certain varieties of Christianity (e.g., evidential apologetics) — but were also important in the development of Christian Existentialism and Postmodern Christianity, as well as of Existentialism and Postmodernism in general.

== Kierkegaard's influence on Karl Barth's early theology ==
Kierkegaard's influence on Karl Barth's early theology is evident in The Epistle to the Romans. The early Barth read at least three volumes of Kierkegaard's works: Practice in Christianity, The Moment, and an Anthology from his journals and diaries. Almost all key terms from Kierkegaard which had an important role in The Epistle to the Romans can be found in Practice in Christianity. The concept of the indirect communication, the paradox, and the moment of Practice in Christianity, in particular, confirmed and sharpened Barth's ideas on contemporary Christianity and the Christian life.

Kierkegaard and the early Barth think that in Christianity, direct communication is impossible because Christ appears incognito. For them Christ is a paradox, and therefore one can know him only in indirect communication. They are fully aware of the importance of the moment when the human being stands before God, and is moved by him alone from time to eternity, from the earth to which (s)he belongs to the heaven where God exists.

Barth endorses the main theme from Kierkegaard but also reorganizes the scheme and transforms the details. Barth expands the theory of indirect communication to the field of Christian ethics; he applies the concept of unrecognizability to the Christian life. He coins the concept of the “paradox of faith” since the form of faith entails a contradictory encounter of God and human beings. He also portrayed the contemporaneity of the moment when in crisis a human being desperately perceives the contemporaneity of Christ. In regard to the concept of indirect communication, the paradox, and the moment, the Kierkegaard of the early Barth is a productive catalyst.

What, then, is the difference between an admirer and an imitator? An imitator is or strives to be what he admires, and an admirer keeps himself personally detached, consciously or unconsciously does not discover that what is admired involves a claim upon him, to be or at least to strive to be what is admired.

— Søren Kierkegaard, Practice in Christianity in the Essential Kierkegaard, p.383-84
