= Sickness Unto Death (manga) =

Japanese manga series

- Cover of the first volume of Sickness Unto Death

死に至る病 (Shi ni Itaru Yamai)
- Manga
- Written by: Hikaru Asada
- Illustrated by: Takahiro Seguchi
- Published by: Hakusensha
- English publisher: NA: Vertical
- Magazine: Young Animal
- Original run: March 13, 2009 – December 11, 2009
- Volumes: 2

Sickness Unto Death (Japanese: 死に至る病, Hepburn: Shi ni Itaru Yamai) is a Japanese manga series written by Hikaru Asada and illustrated by Takahiro Seguchi. It was serialized in Hakusensha's seinen manga magazine Young Animal from March to December 2009, with its chapters collected in two tankōbon volumes. In North America, the manga was licensed for English release by Vertical. The manga's title is taken from Søren Kierkegaard's book The Sickness unto Death, which is utilized by the character of Kazuma Futaba at various points throughout the manga.

== Synopsis ==
The manga's story is told partially through the flashbacks of Kazuma, a psychologist. The story starts with him at the ruins of a stately mansion, where he begins to tell one of his students, Minami, about his very first patient: Emiru. Prior to beginning university to study clinical psychology, Kazuma met Emiru by chance when she passed out in a public square. He is surprised when he later discovers that she is the owner of the mansion he will be boarding at. He finds that Emiru is wasting away from an unknown mental illness that caused her hair to turn white and for her to go from a peppy high school girl to a shell of her former self. He vows to help cure her, and initially begins to do so with the help of his clinical psychology professor, Ootsuki-sensei, who is aware of Emiru's case. As he helps treat Emiru, the two fall in love and begin a romantic and sexual relationship. This initially worries Kazuma, but he comes to terms with the idea of sleeping with someone he was originally seeing as a patient and instead plans to support Emiru as a lover rather than a counsellor.

As the series progresses, Kazuma finds that Emiru's parents both died when she was about four years old. He also discovers that the reason for her mental illness is that she had witnessed her father commit suicide in despair over his wife's passing. Unaware of what suicide actually meant, Emiru had tried to hang herself with a jump rope in attempt to see her parents, but failed. This caused the young child to fall into a depression and eventually create an alternate personality as she could not deal with the idea that she was still alive while her parents were not. As he realizes this, Kazuma is stricken because he knows that curing Emiru would result in bringing back the "original" Emiru, who is shown to have the mentality of her four-year-old self. There is a strong chance that the "Emiru" he knew would no longer exist or would end up integrated into the personality of the original Emiru. As her original personality begins to emerge more, Kazuma tries to "kill" her by replicating the suicide attempt made by the original Emiru. This fails, and he is forced to come to the realization that he will not be able to save the "Emiru" he has come to love.

Kazuma eventually manages to reconcile the problems of his "Emiru" by showing that he acknowledges her identity as separate from the original Emiru. As she grew older, the alternate personality began to realize that she was not the true Emiru, and that since this had been unconscious for years, it caused her a significant amount of pain as she realized that the person whom everyone liked did not really exist. "Emiru" then passes out of the psyche of the original Emiru, leaving her with her original childlike personality. After that point Emiru was transferred to the care of Ootsuki-sensei and began to flourish. He still comes into occasional contact with Emiru, as she is shown to have run into Kazuma and his student at the ruins of her former home. She is not able to immediately recognize Kazuma, but is capable of caring for herself to the point where she can go out on her own.

== Publication ==
Written by Hikaru Asada and illustrated by Takahiro Seguchi, Sickness Unto Death was serialized in Hakusensha's seinen manga magazine Young Animal from March 13 to December 11, 2009. The manga's title is taken from Søren Kierkegaard's book The Sickness unto Death, which the character of Kazuma utilizes at various points throughout the manga. Hakusensha collected its chapters in two volumes released on February 26, 2010.

In North America, the manga was licensed for English release by Vertical. The two volumes were released on September 24 and November 19, 2013, respectively.

== Reception ==
Critical reception has been mixed. Brad Rice of Japanator gave it a 9.0, commenting that while the manga would be unlikely to have "true lasting value", it will be "absolutely captivating [in the time you read it]". In contrast, Anime News Network and Otaku USA both gave more mixed reviews, with the reviewer for Otaku USA stating that "While the fast pace is welcome, the story itself isn't quite as gripping as it should be, and Takahiro Seguchi's more-than-competent artwork is pretty, but lacks a spark of its own."
