= Roll Call Records =

American independent record label

- Founded: 2012
- Founder: Rob Abelow
- Distributor(s): The Orchard; House Arrest / Fat Possum
- Genre: Indie rock; folk; alternative rock
- Country of origin: U.S.
- Location: Los Angeles, California
- Official website: rollcallrecords.com

Roll Call Records is an independent record label in Los Angeles, California. President and founder Rob Abelow started the label in 2012 to release albums by artists on the management roster. Shortly thereafter, Roll Call Records partnered with Warner Music's independent label group.

In 2017, Roll Call Records entered a partnership with The Orchard and House Arrest/Fat Possum for distribution and services and opened its first international office in Brighton, UK.

Typhoon's album White Lighter, also released by Roll Call, reached No. 2 on the Billboard Heatseekers charts and No. 98 on Billboard Top 200.

In 2017, Roll Call also opened a singles label, Highland Park.

== Current artists ==
- The Dig
- El Ten Eleven
- Estrons
- Isbells
- ON AN ON
- Night Drive
- Plastic Picnic (Highland Park)
- River Whyless
- Rubblebucket
- Sego
- Summer Camp
- Tigercub
- Typhoon
- Valley Queen

== Former artists ==
- Geographer
- The Lighthouse and the Whaler
- Royal Canoe
- Wintersleep
