= Israelian Hebrew =

Proposed northern dialect of biblical Hebrew

- (proposed)
- Native to: Kingdom of Israel
- Language family: Afro-Asiatic: Semitic; West; Central; Northwest; Canaanite; South; Biblical Hebrew; Israelian Hebrew

Language codes
- ISO 639-3: –

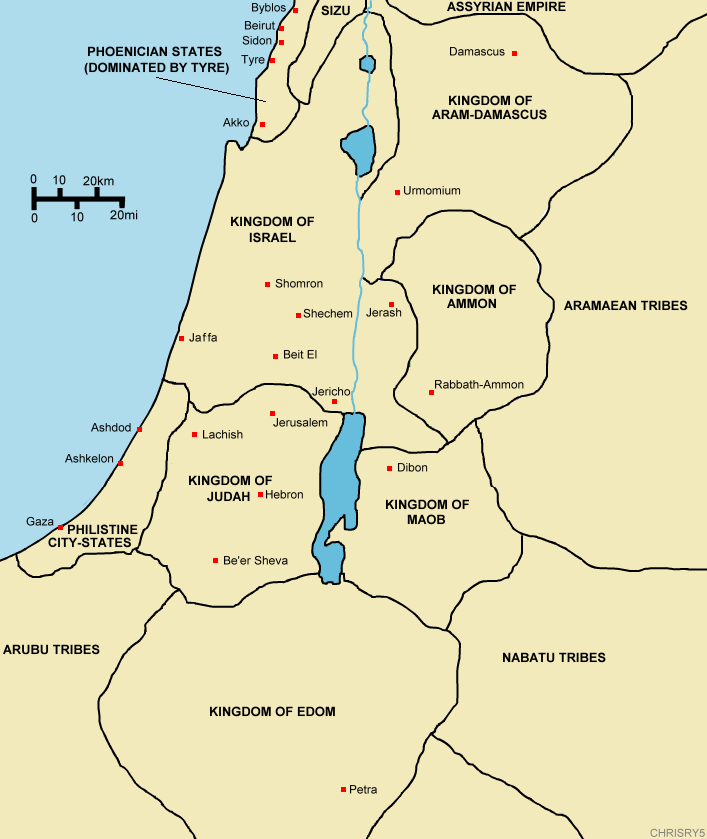
The northern kingdom of Israel and its neighbours.

Israelian Hebrew (or IH) is a northern dialect of biblical Hebrew (BH) proposed as an explanation for various irregular linguistic features of the Masoretic Text (MT) of the Hebrew Bible. It competes with the alternative explanation that such features are Aramaisms, indicative either of late dates of composition, or of editorial emendations. Although IH is not a new proposal, it only started gaining ground as a challenge to older arguments to late dates for some biblical texts since about a decade before the turn of the 21st century: linguistic variation in the Hebrew Bible might be better explained by synchronic rather than diachronic linguistics, meaning various biblical texts could be significantly older than many 20th century scholars supposed.

What constitutes linguistic irregularity in the MT is not in dispute, nor is the affinity of many these features to aspects of Aramaic. What distinguishes the theories is a historical question of language contact. It is known that the Kingdom of Judah (from which name the Jewish people are known), suffered a defeat at the hands of the Aramaic speaking neo-Babylonian Empire, which involved deportation according to standard Babylonian practice. This language contact is recognised by all scholars, as are the resultant Aramaisms in late Biblical Hebrew (LBH). What the IH proposal explains, which LBH does not, is the Aramaisms (and other features) that appear in texts that many scholars would consider antedated the period of exile in Babylon. The two theories are thus not incompatible, which is why they co-existed throughout the 20th century. However, the more recent work does pose a challenge to the traditional dating of some specific texts in the Bible, the Song of Songs in particular.

== Phonology ==
The reconstruction of IH proposes that diachronic phonetic shifts in ancient Israelite dialects varied geographically, with northern shifts attesting a number of isoglosses with Aramaic and other northwest Semitic languages.

=== ṯ̣ > ṣ or ṯ̣ > ṭ ===
The assumed proto-Semitic phoneme ṯ̣ [θʼ] shifts to ṣ [sʼ] in standard biblical Hebrew (SBH), but to ṭ [tʼ] in Aramaic. So original proto-Semitic nṯ̣r ("guard" or "keep") becomes nṣr (נצר) in SBH, but nṭr (נטר) in Aramaic. However, the form nṭr is found in several places in the Bible—in Leviticus 19:18, Jeremiah 3:5,12, Nahum 1:2 and Psalm 103:9—though it has the sense "be angry" in these places. Brown–Driver–Briggs (1907) and the Hebrew and Aramaic Lexicon of the Old Testament (1994–99) treat nṭr as a coinage derivative from nṯ̣r—hence "keep one's anger"— though Ludwig Koehler and Walter Baumgartner's earlier lexicon (Lexicon in Veteris Testamenti libros, 1958) took a different approach. Irrespective of whether or not SBH coined (or borrowed) this root to convey the sense of "be angry", the Bible also attests the use of nṭr in exactly the same sense as the proto-Semitic word nṯ̣r. The question is, is this latter data evidence of early assimilation of Aramaic in the north, or alternatively of late composition or editorial emendation, after Imperial Aramaic started to replace SBH in post-exilic Kingdom of Judah in the south?

== Morphology ==
Various irregularities in the morphology of words attested in BH also show affinities with languages neighbouring ancient Israel to the north.

=== Relative pronoun ===
The relative pronoun in SBH is asher (אשר ’ăšer), and in Mishnaic Hebrew (MH) is sh– (–ש). LBH appears to represent a transition stage: the latter form appears, but inconsistently. The Song of Songs is unusual in that it uses –ש consistently, with the sole exception of its first verse, which functions as a title. The Phoenician and Ammonite cognate is אש.

=== Independent pronoun ===
The irregular second-person feminine singular independent pronoun אתי appears as the Ketiv in several IH texts including Judges 17:2, 1 Kings 14:2, and 2 Kings 4:16, 4:23, 8:1.

=== Nomina actionis ===
Nominalization of verbs (the paradigm example being qātal, קטל) by forming a feminine nomen actionis (qətîlā^{h}, קטלה) is common in MH, but rare in SBH.

== Syntax ==
=== Double plural ===
Biblical Hebrew utilises the construct state, typical of many Afroasiatic and especially Semitic languages, to indicate a genitive case relationship between nouns. In simple two-noun examples, the first noun (nomen regens) is cast in the phonetically abbreviated construct state, while the second—more generally, the final—noun (nomen rectum) occurs in its phonetically full form, known as the status absolutus.

In SBH, the plural–singular distinction between nouns is still apparent, whether they are cast in absolute or construct form. However, there are a number of cases in the Hebrew Bible where the plural form of either the nomen regens or rectum is adopted to echo its partner, irrespective of whether it is intended to denote a singular referent. A clear example comes from 2 Kings 15:25, where the form of the toponymic nomen rectum Gilead is plural in the construction bənē Gilʿādim (בני גלעדים), but clearly means "the sons of Gilead", not "*the sons of Gileads". An example of the same phrase as bənē Gilʿād (בני גלעד) can be found in Numbers 26:30, without the masculine plural suffix –im added to the place name Gilʿād.

=== Periphrastic genitive ===
A periphrastic genitive is utilized in MH, Aramaic, and Akkadian of the Amurru kingdom to convey an intensity regarding possession, but it is only used once in the Bible—in Song of Songs 3:7 "Solomon's divan" (מטתו שלשלמה, lit. "his divan which is Solomon's").

=== Deponent participle ===
There are two and only two instances of a deponent participle (passive form with active meaning) in the Hebrew Bible: nəḥittim (נחתים, "descended" for descending, 2 Kings 6:9) and ʾaḥuzi ḥereb̲ (אחזי חרב, "grasped of sword", Song of Songs 3:8). Song (or Canticles) 3:8 survives in the Qumran fragment 4QCant^{c}. This grammatical device is common in Mishnaic Hebrew (MH) and Syriac, which are relatively late languages, but the contexts could also suggest northern settings, influencing the phraseology.

=== Demonstrative pronoun ===
The variant feminine singular demonstrative pronoun זוֹ / זֹה is found in 2 Kings 6:19, Hosea 7:16, Psalm 132:12, and six times in the book of Ecclesiastes. All of these are IH texts, making this variant demonstrative pronoun a peculiarity of the Israelian Hebrew dialect.

== Lexicon ==
A number of words have uneven distribution in the MT of the Hebrew Bible, if the indicators above (and internal evidence from the semantics of the texts) are used to identify which portions may have Israelite provenance. In many cases, these words are also attested in the languages of ancient Israel's northern neighbours, like Ugarit, Phoenicia and Aram.

One of the clearest cases is the use of the word nʕm (נעם, "good, sweet, pleasant", as in the name Naomi) in contrast to the word ṭb (טב). In Ugaritic, as in SBH, both nʕm and ṭb are used to convey the idea goodness. In Phoenician, nʕm is the only attested word for "good". It is also common in personal names: Adonis is called נעמן in Phoenician. Likewise, we know of the Aramaic name Naaman, from the general of that name mentioned in 2 Kings 5. Close inspection of the MT reveals that 22 to 26 of the thirty uses of נעם can be associated with the north.

== Methodology ==
The IH hypothesis identifies a number of linguistic features which are irregular in biblical Hebrew, but standard in the languages of her northern neighbours, or in MH (which clearly postdates the Bible, since it quotes it).

== Evidence in the Song of Songs ==
As early as 1920, Samuel Rolles Driver considered of the Song of Songs "that it belongs to North Israel, where there is reason to suppose that the language spoken differed dialectically from that of Judah." Ian Young published, in 2001, orthographic evidence from one of the Dead Sea Scrolls (4QCant^{b}), attesting features of IH. By 2009, Noegel and Rendsburg had listed a total of "twenty grammatical and thirty-one lexical items" typical of IH in the MT of the Song.

== Bibliography ==
- Driver, Samuel Rolles (1920). An introduction to the Literature of the Old Testament. Charles Scribner's Sons.
- Gervitz, Stanley (1986). "Of Syntax and Style in the 'Late Biblical Hebrew'–'Old Canaanite' Connection". Journal of the Ancient Near Eastern Society. 18: 28–29.
- Hurvitz, Avi.
- Noegel, Scott B.; Rendsburg, Gary A. (November 2009). Solomon's Vinyard: literary and linguistic studies in the Song of Songs. SBL - Ancient Israel and its Literature. Society of Biblical Literature. ISBN 978-90-04-16925-8.
- Rendsburg, Gary A (2012). "Northern Hebrew through Time: From the Song of Deborah to the Mishnah". In Miller-Naudé, Cynthia L; Zevit, Ziony (eds.). Diachrony in Biblical Hebrew. Winona Lake, IN: Eisenbrauns. pp. 339–359.
- Rendsburg, Gary A. (2003). "A Comprehensive Guide to Israelian Hebrew: Grammar and Lexicon". Orient. 38: 5–35. doi:10.5356/orient1960.38.5.
- Rendsburg, Gary A. (1999). "Notes on Israelian Hebrew (I)". In Avishur, Yitzhak; Deutsch, Robert (eds.). Michael: Historical, Epigraphical and Biblical Studies in Honor of Prof. Michael Heltzer. Tel Aviv: Archaeological Center Publications. pp. 255–258. Archived from the original on 2011-07-20.
- Rendsburg, Gary A. (1992a). "Israelian Hebrew Features in Genesis 49". Maarav. 8: 161–170. doi:10.1086/MAR199208113.
- Rendsburg, Gary A. (1992b). "Morphological Evidence for Regional Dialects in Ancient Hebrew". In Bodine, Walter R. (ed.). Linguistics and Biblical Hebrew. Winona Lake, IN: Eisenbrauns. pp. 65–88.
- Vern, Robyn (2008). The relevance of linguistic evidence to the early dating of the archaic poetry of the Hebrew Bible (PhD dissertation thesis). University of Sydney.
- Young, Ian (2001). "Notes on the Language of 4QCant^{b}". Journal of Jewish Studies. 52: 122–131. doi:10.18647/2315/JJS-2001.
- Young, Ian (1995). "The 'Northernisms' of the Israelite Narratives in Kings". Zeitschrift für Althebräistik. 8: 63–70.
- Young, Ian (1993). Diversity in Pre-Exilic Hebrew. Forschungen zum Alten Testament. Vol. 5. Tübingen: Mohr Siebeck. doi:10.1628/978-3-16-157795-6. ISBN 978-3-16-151676-4.
