= 2 Kings 5 =

2 Kings, chapter 5

- ← chapter 4 chapter 6 →
- The pages containing the Books of Kings (1 & 2 Kings) Leningrad Codex (1008 CE).
- Book: Second Book of Kings
- Hebrew Bible part: Nevi'im
- Order in the Hebrew part: 4
- Category: Former Prophets
- Christian Bible part: Old Testament
- Order in the Christian part: 12

2 Kings 5 is the fifth chapter of the second part of the Books of Kings in the Hebrew Bible or the Second Book of Kings in the Old Testament of the Christian Bible. The book is a compilation of various annals recording the acts of the kings of Israel and Judah by a Deuteronomic compiler in the seventh century BCE, with a supplement added in the sixth century BCE. This chapter records an astonishing healing of Naaman, an Aramean general, by the prophet Elisha.

== Text ==
This chapter was originally written in the Hebrew language. It is divided into 27 verses.

=== Textual witnesses ===
Some early manuscripts containing the text of this chapter in Hebrew are of the Masoretic Text tradition, which includes the Codex Cairensis (895), Aleppo Codex (10th century), and Codex Leningradensis (1008). A fragment containing a part of this chapter in Hebrew was found among the Dead Sea Scrolls, that is, 6Q4 (6QpapKgs; 150–75 BCE) with the extant verse 26.

There is also a translation into Koine Greek known as the Septuagint, made in the last few centuries BCE. Extant ancient manuscripts of the Septuagint version include Codex Vaticanus (B; $\mathfrak{G}$^{B}; 4th century) and Codex Alexandrinus (A; $\mathfrak{G}$^{A}; 5th century). (Note: The whole book of 2 Kings is missing from the extant Codex Sinaiticus.)

=== New Testament references ===
- 2 Kings 5:1–14: Luke 4:27; Luke 17:11–19

== The healing of Naaman (5:1–19) ==
This story of Elisha healing neighboring Aram's highest-ranking military officer, Naaman, of an uncurable illness happened in a period of significant Aramean control over Israel (verse 2; Aram could give Israel orders, verses 6–7), perhaps during the time of Ben-Hadad II and Jehoram, or during the time of Hazael of Aram (reigned 842–796 BCE) Jehu (reigned 841–814 BCE), Jehoahaz (reigned 814–798 BCE) or Joash of Israel (reigned 798–782 BCE; cf. 2 Kings 8:11–12; 10:32–33; 13:22). Elisha's reputation as a miracle-worker spread to Aram through a young female Israelite prisoner-of-war (verse 3), whose information not only helped her master, but also her people in the service of her God. In helping the Aramean general, Elisha simultaneously helped the Israelite king. The Aramean king sent a lot of money and ordered his vassal in Samaria to do impossible task: to immediately produce the necessary miracle to heal Naaman (verse 6–7), but Elisha somehow knew about the letter (seper; literally "scroll") from Aram and sent his own letter to the Israelite king asking Naaman to be directed to the prophet for treatment. Naaman who expected respectful conventional behavior of miracle-healing was understandably unhappy that Elisha did not meet him personally and only prescribed instructions to ritually bathe in the Jordan (verses 9–12), yet after advised by his more sensible soldiers (verse 13), Naaman complied and immediately experienced complete healing (verse 14). Naaman quickly returned to his benefactor, wishing to ensure the future proximity of YHWH whose power had convinced him. Since this God resides only in Israel, he took two mule-loads of Israelite earth to Damascus in order to be able to sacrifice to YHWH there (verses 15a, 17; a sincere 'earthbound understanding of God') with the blessing of Elisha who parted from Naaman in peace (verse 19).

=== Verse 1 ===
Now Naaman, commander of the army of the king of Syria, was a great and honorable man in the eyes of his master, because by him the Lord had given victory to Syria. He was also a mighty man of valor, but a leper.

- "Leper": from Hebrew: צָרַע, tsara, "to be leprous"; does not necessarily refer to Hansen's disease in modern terms, but because it can affect clothing and house (Leviticus 13:47–59; 14:34–53); it could be caused by mold, mildew or some other growth, which nonetheless renders a person ritually unclean (Leviticus 13:45–46).

=== Verses 2–3 ===
^{2} And the Syrians had gone out on raids, and had brought back captive a young girl from the land of Israel. She waited on Naaman's wife.
^{3} Then she said to her mistress, "If only my master were with the prophet who is in Samaria! For he would heal him of his leprosy."

- "On raids": or "in bands"
- "Waited on": or "served"; literally, "was before".

The young girl had much reason to doubt the power of YHWH because of her abduction, but nonetheless showed her confidence in YHWH when informing her mistress about Elisha, in contrast to Naaman who was responsible to subjugate Israel and take away slaves but powerless about his disease.

=== Verse 12 ===
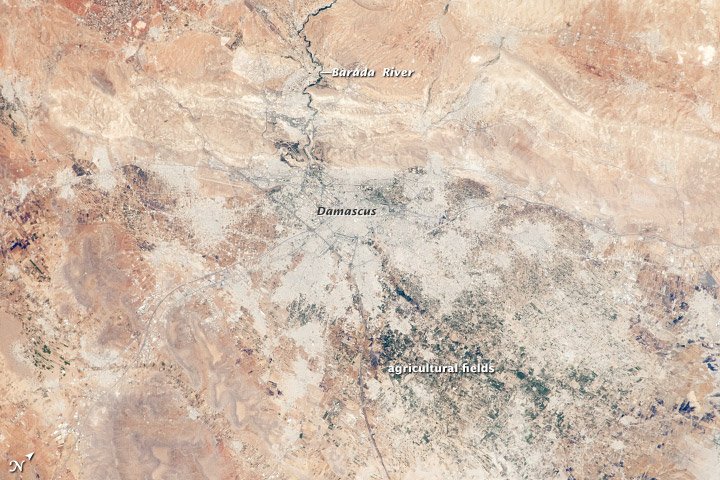
Barada river ("Abanah") and Damascus with surroundings, as seen from space in 2013

"Are not the Abanah and the Pharpar, the rivers of Damascus, better than all the waters of Israel? Could I not wash in them and be clean?" So he turned and went away in a rage.

- "Abanah" (אבנה) from written (ketiv) Hebrew, Greek Septuagint and Latin Vulgate; "Amanah" (אֲמָנָ֨ה) in Hebrew reading (qere), Syriac versions and Targum. It is identified with the Barada river, especially one of its canals or “rivers,” which bears the name "Nahr Banias" retaining a trace of "Abana." It is called "the Chrysorrhoas" by the Greek authors (Strabo, xvi. p. 755; Pliny h. n. 18 or 16).
- "Pharpar" (פַרְפַּ֜ר): is generally identified with the el-Awaj or Nahr al-A‘waj (i.e. crooked), especially a glen flowing to one of its tributaries on the east side of Hermon, which bears the Arabic name "Barbar", a possible relic of the ancient "Pharpar".

== Gehazi's greed and punishment (5:20–27) ==
This passage is an appendix to the main story, the healing of Naaman, with the same purpose of hailing the glory of God and Elisha, but here in the teaching of disciples: what can a prophet accept as recompense for services to God and at what point is it considered selling one's soul? In verses 15b,16, Elisha showed a good example: in a case like this, a prophet accepts nothing, clarifying that great power and wealth cannot force or buy the support of prophets and God, nor must prophets allowed themselves be used as tools for any interest groups (cf. Micah 3:5). Gehazi, Elisha's servant (also mentioned in 2 Kings 4:27–37; 8:4–5) became the complementary negative example: cunningly accepting the presents brought by Naaman for himself, but then receiving condemnation by his master for the act and afflicted by Naaman's former sickness.

=== Verses 26–27 ===
^{26} Then he said to him, “Did not my heart go with you when the man turned back from his chariot to meet you? Is it time to receive money and to receive clothing, olive groves and vineyards, sheep and oxen, male and female servants?
^{27} Therefore, the leprosy of Naaman shall cling to you and your descendants forever.” And he went out from his presence leprous, as white as snow.

- "With you": is not in the Hebrew Masoretic text, but from Septuagint (μετὰ σοῦ̑) for clarification.

Elisha has been directing Naaman's thoughts to YHWH alone as the healer of the disease, so the prophet was out of sight until Naaman was fully cured and steadfastly refused any present to remove any indication that he was in any way instrumental in the healing. Naaman must have been very impressed with the act and pledged to worship YHWH. However, Gehazi's actions possibly obliterated the impression. In listing of all the Gehazi's plan to purchase using the ill-gotten talents Elisha showed Gehazi that he has been reading all his thoughts.

== See also ==
- Aram
- Damascus
- Jordan River
- Mount Ephraim
- Prophet
- Samaria
- Tzaraath
- Related Bible parts: 2 Kings 4, 2 Kings 7, Luke 4, Luke 17

== Sources ==
- Cogan, Mordechai; Tadmor, Hayim (1988). II Kings: A New Translation. Anchor Yale Bible Commentaries. Vol. 11. Doubleday. ISBN 9780385023887.
- Collins, John J. (2014). "Chapter 14: 1 Kings 12 – 2 Kings 25". Introduction to the Hebrew Scriptures. Fortress Press. pp. 277–296. ISBN 9781451469233.
- Coogan, Michael David (2007). Coogan, Michael David; Brettler, Marc Zvi; Newsom, Carol Ann; Perkins, Pheme (eds.). The New Oxford Annotated Bible with the Apocryphal/Deuterocanonical Books: New Revised Standard Version, Issue 48 (Augmented 3rd ed.). Oxford University Press. ISBN 9780195288810.
- Dietrich, Walter (2007). "13. 1 and 2 Kings". In Barton, John; Muddiman, John (eds.). The Oxford Bible Commentary (first (paperback) ed.). Oxford University Press. pp. 232–266. ISBN 978-0199277186.
- Fretheim, Terence E (1997). First and Second Kings. Westminster John Knox Press. ISBN 978-0-664-25565-7.
- Halley, Henry H. (1965). Halley's Bible Handbook: an abbreviated Bible commentary (24th (revised) ed.). Zondervan Publishing House. ISBN 0-310-25720-4.
- Huey, F. B. (1993). The New American Commentary - Jeremiah, Lamentations: An Exegetical and Theological Exposition of Holy Scripture, NIV Text. B&H Publishing Group. ISBN 9780805401165.
- Leithart, Peter J. (2006). 1 & 2 Kings. Brazos Theological Commentary on the Bible. Brazos Press. ISBN 978-1587431258.
- McFall, Leslie (1991), "Translation Guide to the Chronological Data in Kings and Chronicles" (PDF), Bibliotheca Sacra, 148: 3–45, archived from the original (PDF) on August 27, 2010
- McKane, William (1993). "Kings, Book of". In Metzger, Bruce M; Coogan, Michael D (eds.). The Oxford Companion to the Bible. Oxford University Press. pp. 409–413. ISBN 978-0195046458.
- Nelson, Richard Donald (1987). First and Second Kings. Westminster John Knox Press. ISBN 978-0-664-22084-6.
- Pritchard, James B (1969). Ancient Near Eastern texts relating to the Old Testament (3 ed.). Princeton University Press. ISBN 9780691035031.
- Sweeney, Marvin (2007). I & II Kings: A Commentary. Westminster John Knox Press. ISBN 978-0-664-22084-6.
- Thiele, Edwin R. (1983). The Mysterious Numbers of the Hebrew Kings (3rd ed.). Grand Rapids, Michigan: Zondervan. ISBN 978-0-310-36010-0.
- Würthwein, Ernst (1995). The Text of the Old Testament. Translated by Rhodes, Erroll F. Grand Rapids, MI: Wm. B. Eerdmans. ISBN 0-8028-0788-7.
