= 2 Kings 4 =

2 Kings, chapter 4

- ← chapter 3 chapter 5 →
- The pages containing the Books of Kings (1 & 2 Kings) Leningrad Codex (1008 CE).
- Book: Second Book of Kings
- Hebrew Bible part: Nevi'im
- Order in the Hebrew part: 4
- Category: Former Prophets
- Christian Bible part: Old Testament
- Order in the Christian part: 12

2 Kings 4 is the fourth chapter of the second part of the Books of Kings in the Hebrew Bible or the Second Book of Kings in the Old Testament of the Christian Bible. The book is a compilation of various annals recording the acts of the kings of Israel and Judah by a Deuteronomic compiler in the seventh century BCE, with a supplement added in the sixth century BCE. In this chapter some of Elisha's acts are recorded: the first part (verses 1–7) is how he helped a poor widow of a prophet to repay her family debts, the second part (verses 8–37) is how he helped a family to have a son, and the third part (verses 38–44) is how he helped to make the food of his disciples harmless to eat as well as to multiply a small amount of food to feed about one hundred guests with some leftovers.

== Text ==
This chapter was originally written in the Hebrew language and since the 16th century is divided into 44 verses.

=== Textual witnesses ===
Some early manuscripts containing the text of this chapter in Hebrew are of the Masoretic Text tradition, which includes the Codex Cairensis (895), Aleppo Codex (10th century), and Codex Leningradensis (1008).

There is also a translation into Koine Greek known as the Septuagint, made in the last few centuries BCE. Extant ancient manuscripts of the Septuagint version include Codex Vaticanus (B; $\mathfrak{G}$^{B}; 4th century) and Codex Alexandrinus (A; $\mathfrak{G}$^{A}; 5th century). (Note: The whole book of 2 Kings is missing from the extant Codex Sinaiticus.)

== Analysis ==
The narrative moves abruptly from a war story involving Israel and Judah into a series of four small-scale episodes in which Elisha performs miracles for individuals or his disciples, the first two of which involve women, one poor and one rich. Overall, this chapter gives a view about the way the groups of prophets live, such as the community around Elisha. They seemed to lead an 'eremitic existence' in deserted areas, with extremely modest needs, but had followers in the cities from where they received visitors and sometimes they made preaching journeys to the cities themselves.

Elisha himself acts as a 'traveling temple, a human "tabernacle" that bears the life-giving glory of Yahweh', supplying the northern Israel what they could have gotten from the temple in Jerusalem: the water of life and cleansing, food, access to the presence of God. Water is an important object, symbolizing life from YHWH, that through Elisha's contribution, water at Jericho was purified (2 Kings 2:19-22), water came from nowhere to sustain the armies and animals of the three kings (2 Kings 3:20); Naaman was directed to the water of cleansing (2 Kings 5), an iron tool was made floating on the water (2 Kings 6:1-7), and Jehoram was directed to give food and water to Aramean soldiers (2 Kings 6:22-23). The Shunammite woman even sets up a little "temple" for Elisha in the "upper room," (verse 10) where she places a bed, a table, a chair and a lampstand (Hebrew: menorah); a comparable set of furniture to those in the Jerusalem temple ("table" for "showbread"; "chair"/"throne" for "ark"; "bed" for "altar"). Elisha speaks to the woman through his "priest," Gehazi (2 Kings 4:12–13), the Shunammite visits the prophet on Sabbaths and new moons (4:23; in the northern Kingdom, Sabbath and new moons are usually kept, as is evidenced from Amos 8:5), and the sons of the prophets bring him their firstfruits (4:42), and what Israel normally expects at the temple is available from Elisha; what Israelites would expect to do at the temple they do in the presence of Elisha.

== Elisha helps a poor widow (4:1–7) ==
A wife of a prophet-disciple in Elisha's group of prophets was left with an insolvent debt when her husband died, and faced a pressure from the creditor to give up her sons as temporary slaves as the payment for the debts. This is a lawful arrangement for the people of Israel (cf. Exodus 21:2-4; Deuteronomy 15:12), which is also found throughout the ancient Near East. However, in Elisha's time, this was used systematically as a method to rob farmers of their land (Isaiah 5:8; Amos 2:6; Micah 2:2). In the widow's case, the loss of support from her sons, after losing the protection from her husband, would severely ruin her life. Elisha, apparently regarded as the spiritual leader of the prophet-fraternity as well as 'a kind of clan-chief carrying social responsibility for its members', might not have the material, financial or legal means to help her, but he can perform miracles; this time by increasing what little she has beyond all measure with the active help of her and her children. The widow showed her faith in the prophet and his God (cf. a similar structure in 1 Kings 17:7–16 and Mark 6:35–44; 8:1–10) and received some full jars of oil, worth enough money to relieve the woman and her children from their plight. As in the earlier purification story of the water (2:19-22), Elisha enlists the help of the person for whom the miracle is to be performed.

=== Verse 1 ===
A certain woman of the wives of the sons of the prophets cried out to Elisha, saying, "Your servant my husband is dead, and you know that your servant feared the Lord. And the creditor is coming to take my two sons to be his slaves."

- "Feared": refers to "obedience and allegiance", as a "healthy respect for the Lord’s authority".

== Elisha helps a childless woman to bear a son (4:8–37) ==
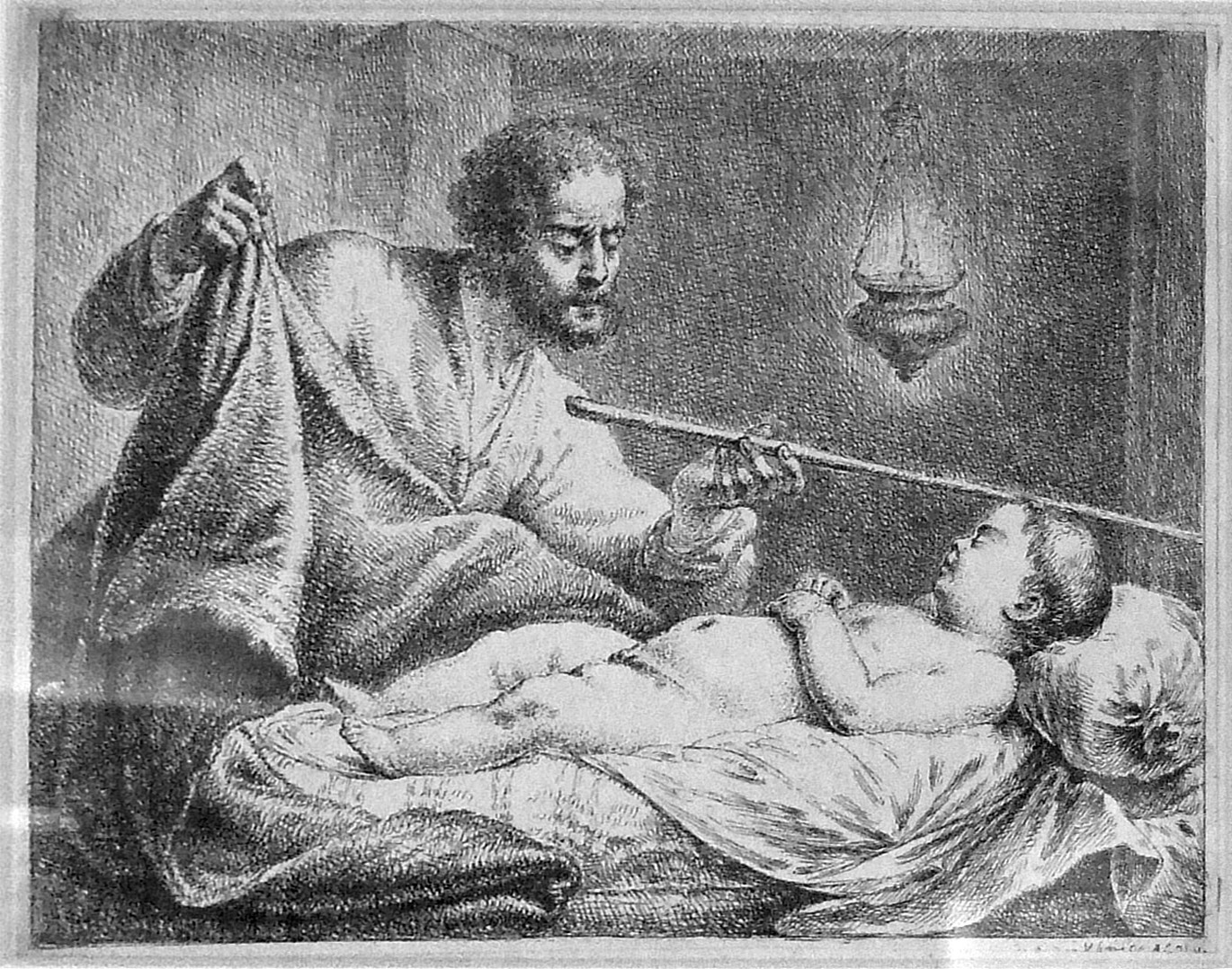
Gehazi attempts to awaken the son of the Shunammite woman with the staff of Elisha

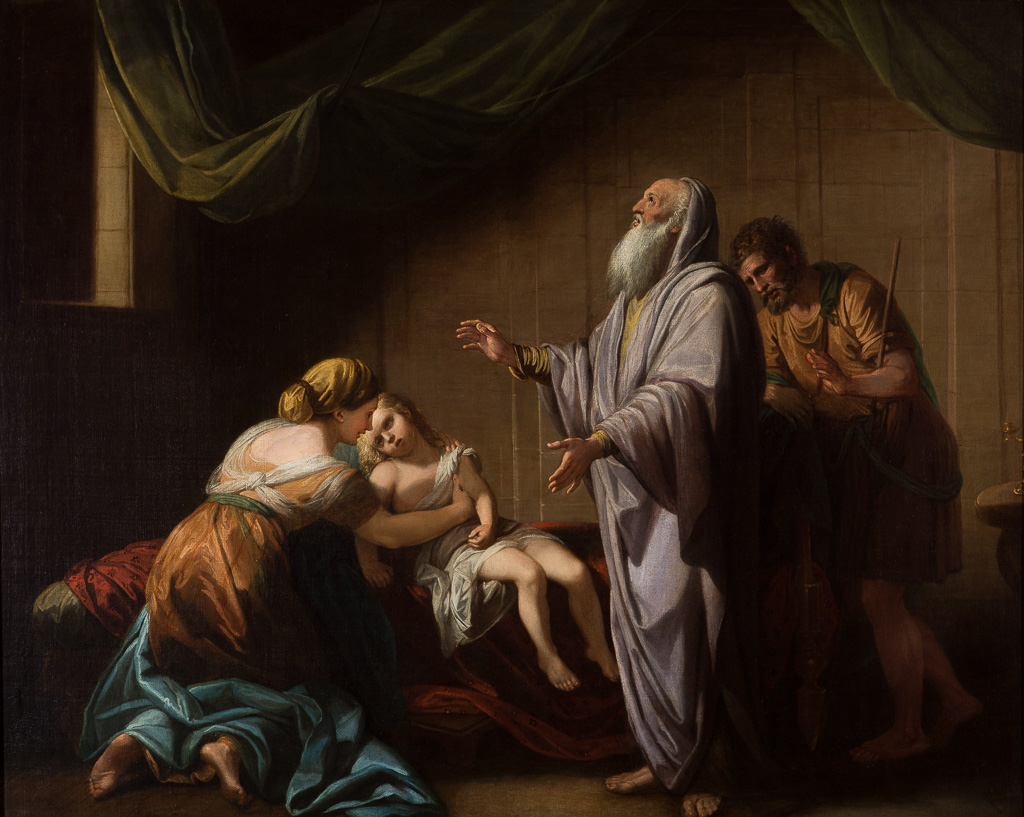
Elisha raises son of the woman of Shunem, Benjamin West, 1765.

Compared to the previous miraculous provision of oil, the second episode reveals interesting contrasts: "The poor widow was with two children but no food, but here is a rich matron was with no children but plenty to offer Elisha. The poor woman appealed to Elisha; the Shunammite woman asks for nothing. The miracle of the oil saves the poor woman's children; the miracle of the Shunammite's child leads to his death. Elisha instructs the poor woman; the Shunammite takes matters into her own hands and forces Elisha to revive her dead son". In this episode, Elisha is 'twice caught off guard and must quickly find solutions to the situations that confront him'. The story of the woman and her son will be concluded in chapter 8.

=== Structure of 4:8–37 ===
The main act is the Shunammite's appeal to Elisha and his response, and this is prefaced by three background scenes, each of which begins with the phrase "one day". The episode may be outlined as follows:

I. Background

A The Shunammite woman prepares a place for Elisha- "one day" (verses 8–10)
B Elisha confronts the woman and promises a son who is born-"one day" (verses 11–17)
C The son dies-"one day" (verses 18–20)

II. Foreground

A' The Shunammite woman prepares for her journey to Elisha (verses 21–25a)
B' The woman confronts Elisha (verses 25b–30)
C' Gehazi fails and Elisha succeeds in reviving the son (verses 31–37)

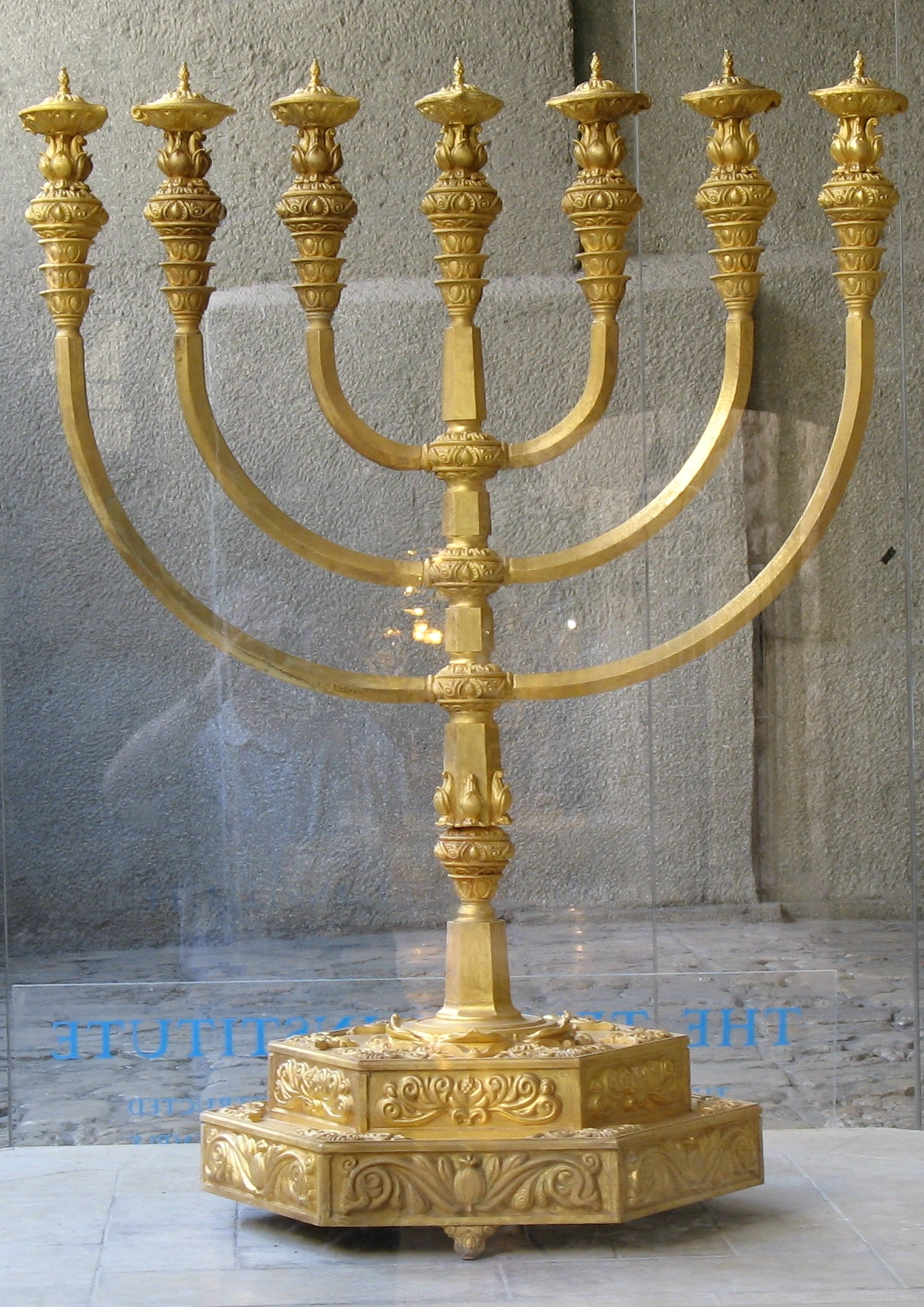
A reconstruction of a menorah (for the Temple) created by the Temple Institute

=== Verse 8 ===
Now it happened one day that Elisha went to Shunem, where there was a notable woman, and she persuaded him to eat some food. So it was, as often as he passed by, he would turn in there to eat some food.

- "Notable": lit. "great"; perhaps in the sense of "wealthy".
- "Persuaded him" (NKJV; KJV: "constrained him"): lit. "laid hold on him".

=== Verse 10 ===
[The woman said to her husband:] "Please, let us make a small upper room on the wall; and let us put a bed for him there, and a table and a chair and a lampstand; so it will be, whenever he comes to us, he can turn in there."

- "A small upper room on the wall": can be rendered as "a small walled upper chamber" or "a fully walled upper room."
- ”A lampstand”: from Hebrew: מנורה, mə-nō-w-rāh, "menorah".

== Elisha helps the disciples with meals (4:38–44) ==
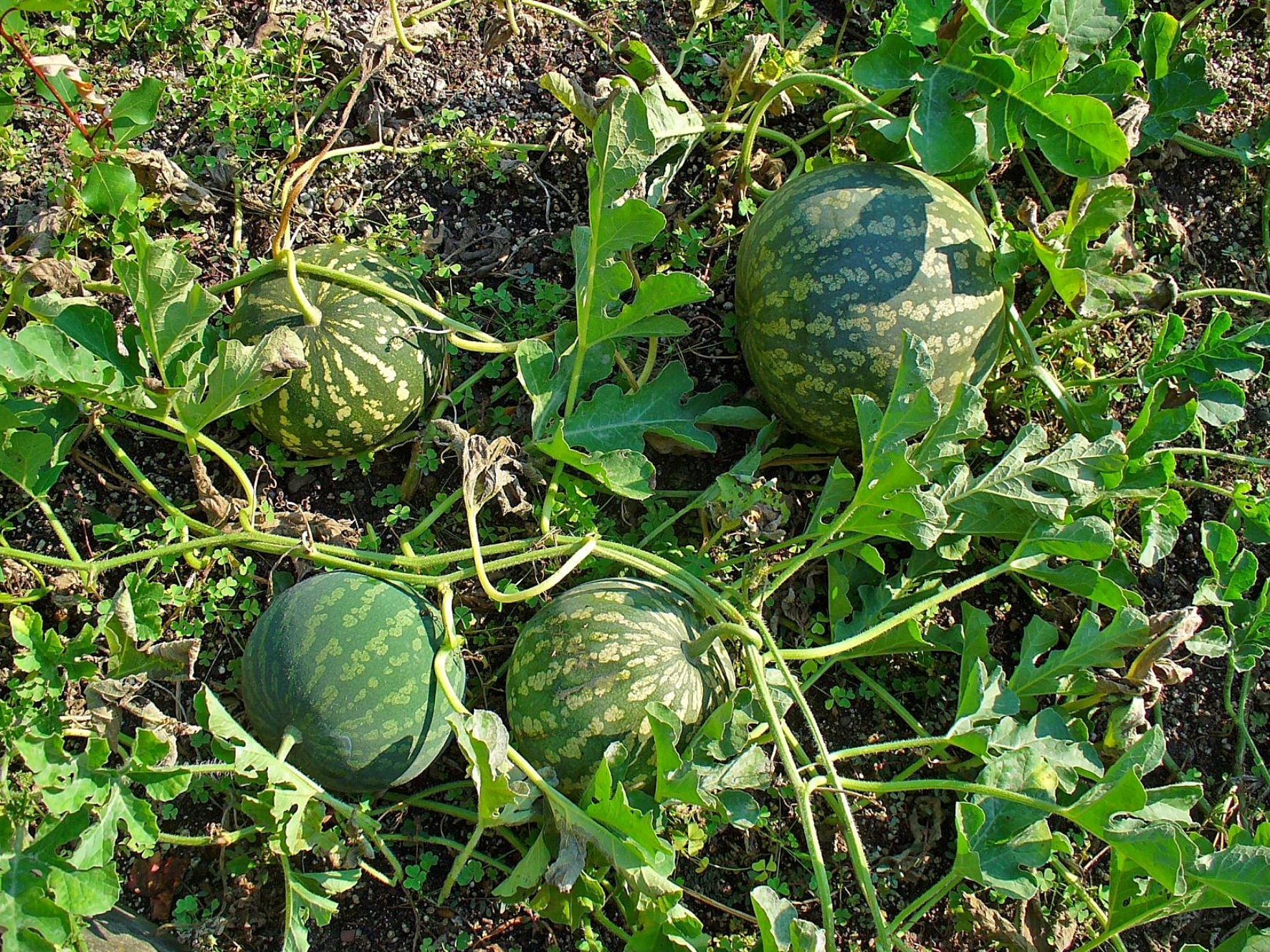
Ripe fruit of Citrullus colocynthis (wild gourd/pumpkin)

The group of prophets in Elisha's community must literally scrape together a living in the barren area of lower Jordan valley, but their trust in YHWH enables them to enjoy divine care. Two of their miraculous experiences are recorded here. One obviously inexperienced man finds a vegetable he does not recognize and put it in the large cooking-pot for meal, but it turns out to have toxic effects. Elisha performs a miracle to make it harmless by adding a little amount of flour (verses 38–41). Another short episode in verses 42–44 involves the multiplication of food (such as known in the New Testament) from a little that they have to an amount that all who are hungry can be satisfied and still having some left over.

=== Verse 39 ===
So one went out into the field to gather herbs, and found a wild vine, and gathered from it a lapful of wild gourds, and came and sliced them into the pot of stew, though they did not know what they were.

- "Wild gourds": are identified as "wild pumpkins" (Citrullus colocynthis), which 'grows on flat tendrils in arid places and is used as a medicine', but has toxic effects when consumed in great quantities.

=== Verse 42 ===
And there came a man from Ba'al-shalisha, and brought the man of God bread of the first fruits, twenty loaves of barley, and full ears of corn in his sack. And he said, Give to the people, that they may eat.

- "first fruits": The Jerusalem Talmud (Sanhedrin 1:2, page 6a in Oz ve-Hadar edition) says that in Baal-shalisha the fruits there ripen earlier than in other places, and that they were permitted to eat of the barley harvest on the 16th day of the lunar month of Nisan, immediately after the first of the barley harvest was offered in the Temple. The said incident is said to have happened during years of famine in the country, and in order that the people could eat the new grain harvest as quickly as possible, Elisha refused to intercalate that same year by adding an additional lunar month Adar.

== 2013 Tel Rehov excavation ==
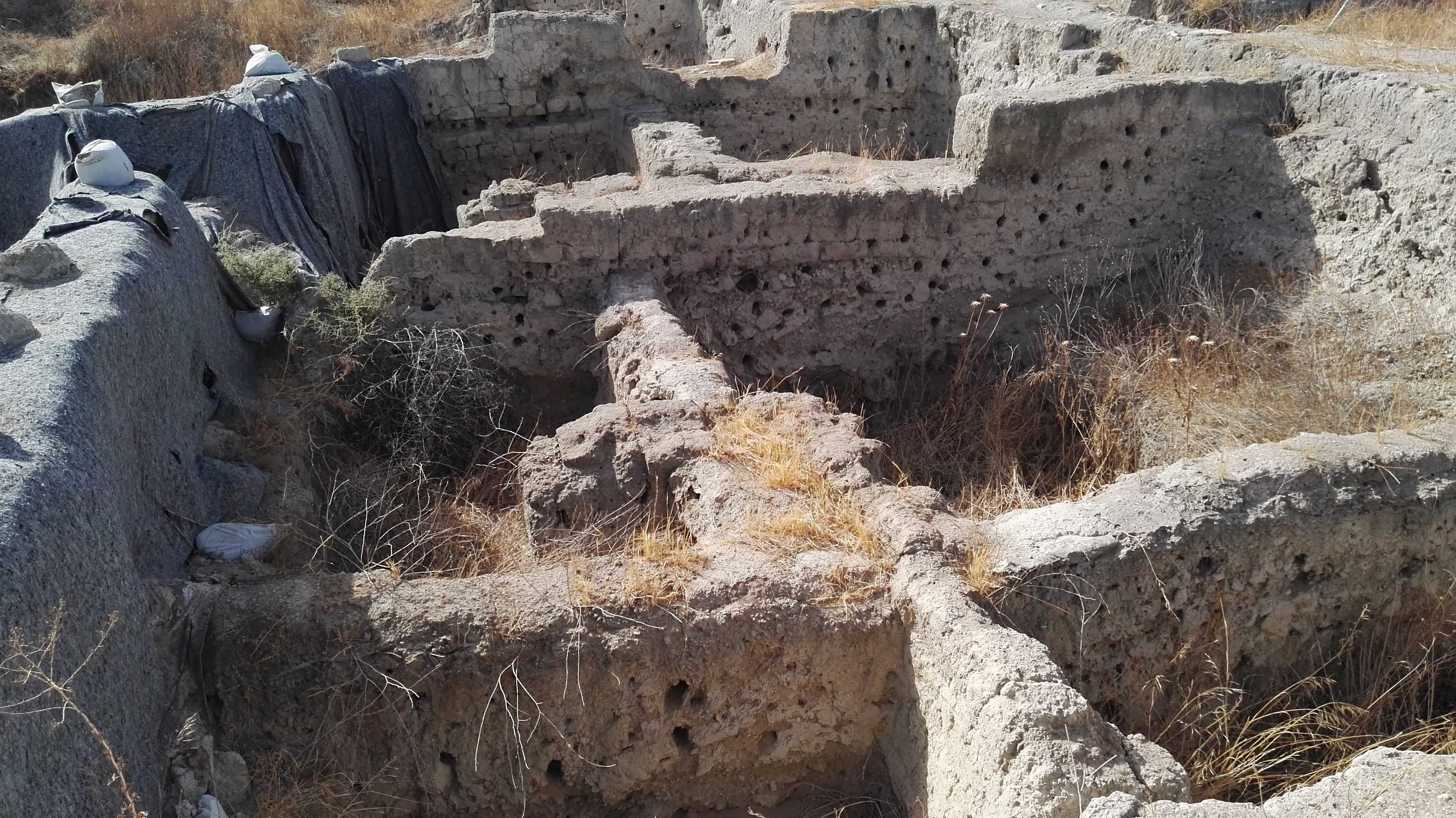
The excavation site at Tel Rehov.

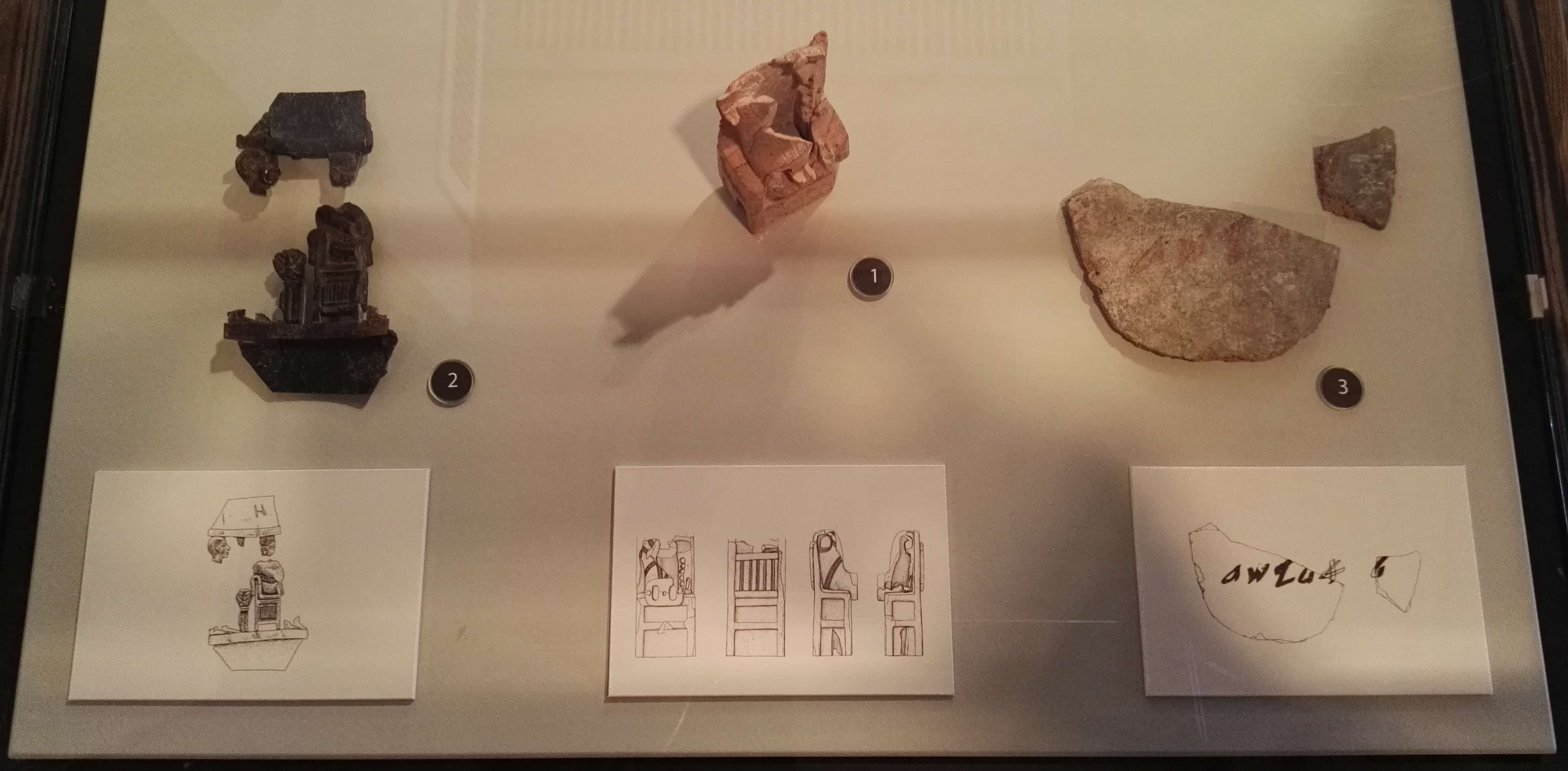
Right: The ostracon with the name "Elisha" (in Paleo-Hebrew script) on it from the excavation site at Tel Rehov.

During the 2013 excavations in Tel Rehov a team directed by the Hebrew University of Jerusalem archaeologist Amihai Mazar uncovered a pottery fragment (sherd) bearing the name "Elisha", a table and a bench in a particular room excavated from a ruin dated to the second half of the ninth century BCE (the period when the prophet Elisha was active), which is linked to 2 Kings 4:8–10. Additionally, a storage jar from the same period was found in the ruin of another building at Tel Rehov bearing the inscription "Nimshi", the same name as the father or grandfather of the 9th-century king Jehu.

== See also ==
- Baal Shalisha
- Gilgal
- Mount Carmel
- Shunem
- Related Bible parts: 2 Kings 2, 2 Kings 6, 2 Kings 8

== Sources ==
- Cohn, Robert L. (2000). Cotter, David W.; Walsh, Jerome T.; Franke, Chris (eds.). 2 Kings. Berit Olam (The Everlasting Covenant): Studies In Hebrew Narrative And Poetry. Liturgical Press. ISBN 9780814650547.
- Collins, John J. (2014). "Chapter 14: 1 Kings 12 – 2 Kings 25". Introduction to the Hebrew Scriptures. Fortress Press. pp. 277–296. ISBN 9781451469233.
- Coogan, Michael David (2007). Coogan, Michael David; Brettler, Marc Zvi; Newsom, Carol Ann; Perkins, Pheme (eds.). The New Oxford Annotated Bible with the Apocryphal/Deuterocanonical Books: New Revised Standard Version, Issue 48 (Augmented 3rd ed.). Oxford University Press. ISBN 9780195288810.
- Dietrich, Walter (2007). "13. 1 and 2 Kings". In Barton, John; Muddiman, John (eds.). The Oxford Bible Commentary (first (paperback) ed.). Oxford University Press. pp. 232–266. ISBN 978-0199277186.
- Halley, Henry H. (1965). Halley's Bible Handbook: an abbreviated Bible commentary (24th (revised) ed.). Zondervan Publishing House. ISBN 0-310-25720-4.
- Leithart, Peter J. (2006). 1 & 2 Kings. Brazos Theological Commentary on the Bible. Brazos Press. ISBN 978-1587431258.
- McKane, William (1993). "Kings, Book of". In Metzger, Bruce M; Coogan, Michael D (eds.). The Oxford Companion to the Bible. Oxford University Press. pp. 409–413. ISBN 978-0195046458.
- Würthwein, Ernst (1995). The Text of the Old Testament. Translated by Rhodes, Erroll F. Grand Rapids, MI: Wm. B. Eerdmans. ISBN 0-8028-0788-7.
