= Judah ibn Kuraish =

Judah ibn Kuraish (Hebrew: יהודה אבן קריש, Arabic: يهوذا بن قريش, fl. 8th-9th centuries CE), was an Algerian-Jewish grammarian and lexicographer. He was born at Tiaret in Algeria and flourished in the 9th century. While his grammatical works advanced little beyond his predecessors, he was the first to study comparative philology in Hebrew, Aramaic, and Arabic. He recognized that the various Semitic languages are derived from one source and that although they are different in their development, they are subject to the same linguistic laws. Judah's grammatical researches were original, and he maintained his views regardless of the Mishnah and the Talmud so he has been erroneously considered a Karaite.

== Risalah ==
His Risalah, a letter in Arabic but written in the Hebrew script, to the community at Fes (ed. Bargès and Goldberg, Paris, 1857), is the earliest known contribution to the critical study of the Semitic languages. The work is divided into three sections, with an introduction. He warns the community not to neglect the study of the Targumim since they are important for a correct knowledge of the Bible, which contains many Aramaisms. In the first section, he compares biblical words to similar Aramaic words. In the second section, he compares biblical words to later Rabbinic Hebrew. He makes the comparison for 17 words even if they do not have a direct comparison. The third section is structured differently from the other two in that he does not deal with individual words. Instead, he deals with the larger relationship between the three Semitic languages. He explores ideas such as the interchange of letters or pronunciation, the presence or loss of certain weaker letters in roots like the Nun, the changes of letters used in tenses, changes in gender in names and number and additional vowels or the lack thereof. An additional section is attached to the third section in which he examines the relationship between Arabic and Hebrew. In particular, he notes the alternations of Aleph with Ayin, Ayin with Ghain, Zayin with Dalet, Tsade with Teth, Shin with Taw, etc.

He is also said to have written, in addition to the Risalah, a dictionary and a book on the Commandments. However, little is known about them. Although he mentions his dictionary in the Risalah, nothing remains of it or his other book.

== Sources ==
- Goldberg, preface to the Risalah, Paris, 1857
- Gustav Karpeles, Geschichte der Jüdischen Literatur, i. 435 et seq., Berlin, 1886
- Winter and Wünsche, Die Jüdische Litteratur, ii.142-144.
