= 2 Kings 8 =

2 Kings, chapter 8

- ← chapter 7 chapter 9 →
- The pages containing the Books of Kings (1 & 2 Kings) Leningrad Codex (1008 CE).
- Book: Second Book of Kings
- Hebrew Bible part: Nevi'im
- Order in the Hebrew part: 4
- Category: Former Prophets
- Christian Bible part: Old Testament
- Order in the Christian part: 12

2 Kings 8 is the eighth chapter of the second part of the Books of Kings in the Hebrew Bible or the Second Book of Kings in the Old Testament of the Christian Bible. The book is a compilation of various annals recording the acts of the kings of Israel and Judah by a Deuteronomic compiler in the seventh century BCE, with a supplement added in the sixth century BCE. This chapter records Elisha's acts in helping the family of Shunammite woman to escape famine, then to gain back their land (verses 1–6) and in contributing to Hazael's ascension to the throne of Syria (Aram) in verses 7–15; then subsequently records the reigns of Joram and Ahaziah, the kings of Judah.

== Text ==
This chapter was originally written in the Hebrew language and since the 16th century is divided into 29 verses.

=== Textual witnesses ===
Some early manuscripts containing the text of this chapter in Hebrew are of the Masoretic Text tradition, which includes the Codex Cairensis (895), Aleppo Codex (10th century), and Codex Leningradensis (1008). Fragments containing parts of this chapter in Hebrew were found among the Dead Sea Scrolls, that is, 6Q4 (6QpapKgs; 150–75 BCE) with extant verses 1–5.

There is also a translation into Koine Greek known as the Septuagint, made in the last few centuries BCE. Extant ancient manuscripts of the Septuagint version include Codex Vaticanus (B; $\mathfrak{G}$^{B}; 4th century) and Codex Alexandrinus (A; $\mathfrak{G}$^{A}; 5th century). (Note: The whole book of 2 Kings is missing from the extant Codex Sinaiticus.)

== Locations ==
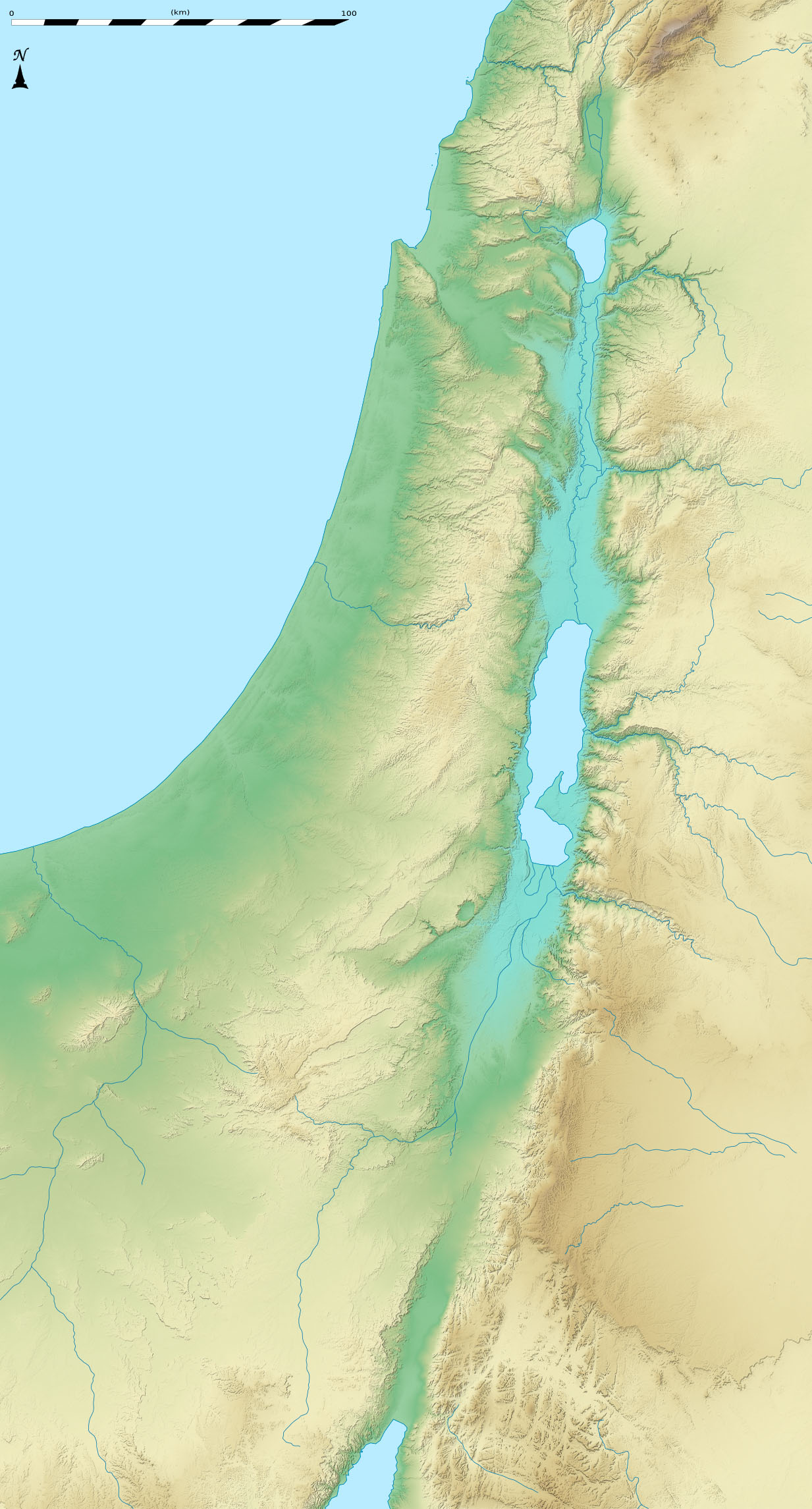
Places mentioned (blue) and alluded (black) in this chapter.
Places mentioned (blue) and alluded (black) in this chapter.

This chapter mentions or alludes to the following places (in order of appearance):

- Shunem
- Samaria
- Damascus
- Ramoth-Gilead
- Jerusalem
- Jezreel

== Elisha helps a refugee (8:1–6) ==
The part is a continuation to the story of the Shunammite woman in 4:8–37. Elisha foresees famine, warns the woman, and recommends her and her family to leave the area until the famine ends (cf. the stories of Ruth and Joseph and economic refugees today). On her return seven years later she found that her property belongs to someone else, probably fell into the crown's hands since it had no owner for a while (as there is no record of a dispute with neighbors). The woman appeals to the king who returns her the land on hearing of her connections with Elisha after being impressed by Elisha's miracle-working power told by Elisha's servant Gehazi.

=== Verse 1 ===
Then Elisha spoke to the woman whose son he had restored to life, saying, "Arise and go, you and your household, and stay wherever you can; for the Lord has called for a famine, and furthermore, it will come upon the land for seven years."

- ”Stay wherever you can”: lit.in Hebrew “live temporarily where you can live temporarily”.

== Elisha triggers a change of power in Damascus (8:7–15) ==
The events that continue to 2 Kings 9–10 form one of two political stories placed at the end of the Elisha cycle (the other in 2 Kings 13:14–21). The Aramean king, named here as Benhadad, becomes seriously ill and sends his general Hazael to Elisha, who was in Damascus at that time, to request an oracle. Elisha's reply is puzzling: Hazael should tell the king he will recover although he will also die (verse 10), which is clarified a little later: the king would have survived his illness (verse 14), but would not survive Hazael's assassination attempt (verse 15). Hazael's brutality against Israel was also revealed by the prophet (verses 11–13; cf. 1 Kings 19:17; 2 Kings 8:28; 10:32–33; 12:17–18; 13:3; Amos 1:3). It is a tragic future event that Elisha could not prevent to happen while the agent of destruction himself was before him at that moment. During the last year's of Benhadad' reign the relationship between Israel and Aram was relaxed, but the change of power in Damascus dramatically worsened it. The war between Hazael and Israel shortly after his accession leads to the Omride Joram's wounding and his murder (followed by the murder of Ahaziah of Judah) by general Jehu. Hazael as an instrument of vengeance against Ahab's family was mentioned during the encounter of YHWH and Elijah at Mount Sinai (1 Kings 19).

=== Structure of 8:7–15 ===
A chiastic structure is observed in this part with the focus of attention on the central dialogue between Hazael and Elisha, as follows:

A Introduction: sickness of Ben-hadad (verse 7)

B Ben-hadad commissions Hazael (verse 8)

C Hazael goes to Elisha (verse 9a)

X Hazael and Elisha dialogue (verses 9b-13)

C' Hazael returns to Ben-hadad (verse 14)

B' Ben-hadad receives Hazael (verse 14)

A' Conclusion: death of Ben-hadad (verse 15)

=== Verse 7 ===
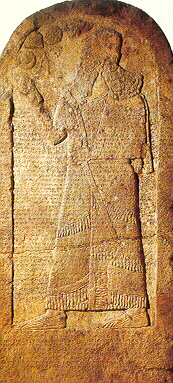
Kurkh stela of Shalmaneser depicting the battle of Qarqar in 853 BCE and mentioning Ben-Hadad (written as "Adad-’idri"; Hadadezer) king of Aram Damascus and Ahab king of Israel.

Then Elisha went to Damascus, and Ben-Hadad king of Syria was sick; and it was told him, saying, "The man of God has come here."

- "Ben-Hadad": refers to "Ben-Hadad II" or "Hadadezer", who was the king of Aram Damascus (reigning 880–842 BCE), known from Kurkh Monolith for his involvement at the battle of Qarqar (where he led a coalition of twelve kings, including Ahab of Israel) against the Assyrian king Shalmaneser III in 853 BCE. Attested in the Book of Kings (1 Kings 19, 20) and in an inscription of the Assyrian king Shalmanesser III, that Hadad-Ezer was succeeded by Hazael.

=== Verse 13 ===
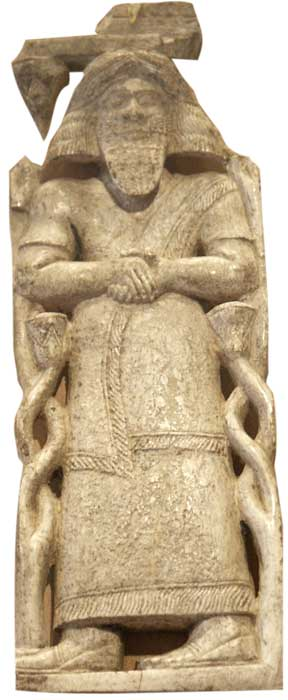
The statue of the Aramaean king Hazael from Arslan Tash.

So Hazael said, "But what is your servant—a dog, that he should do this gross thing?"
And Elisha answered, "The Lord has shown me that you will become king over Syria."

Elisha carries out the anointing of Hazael according to the divine commission to Elijah, his predecessor, in 1 King's 19:15.

- "A dog": Hazael's own description of his obscure origin was attested in an Assyrian source which states that he was the "son of nobody".
- "Syria": in Hebrew: אֲרָֽם, ’ă-rām, referring to Aram Damascus.

=== Verse 15 ===
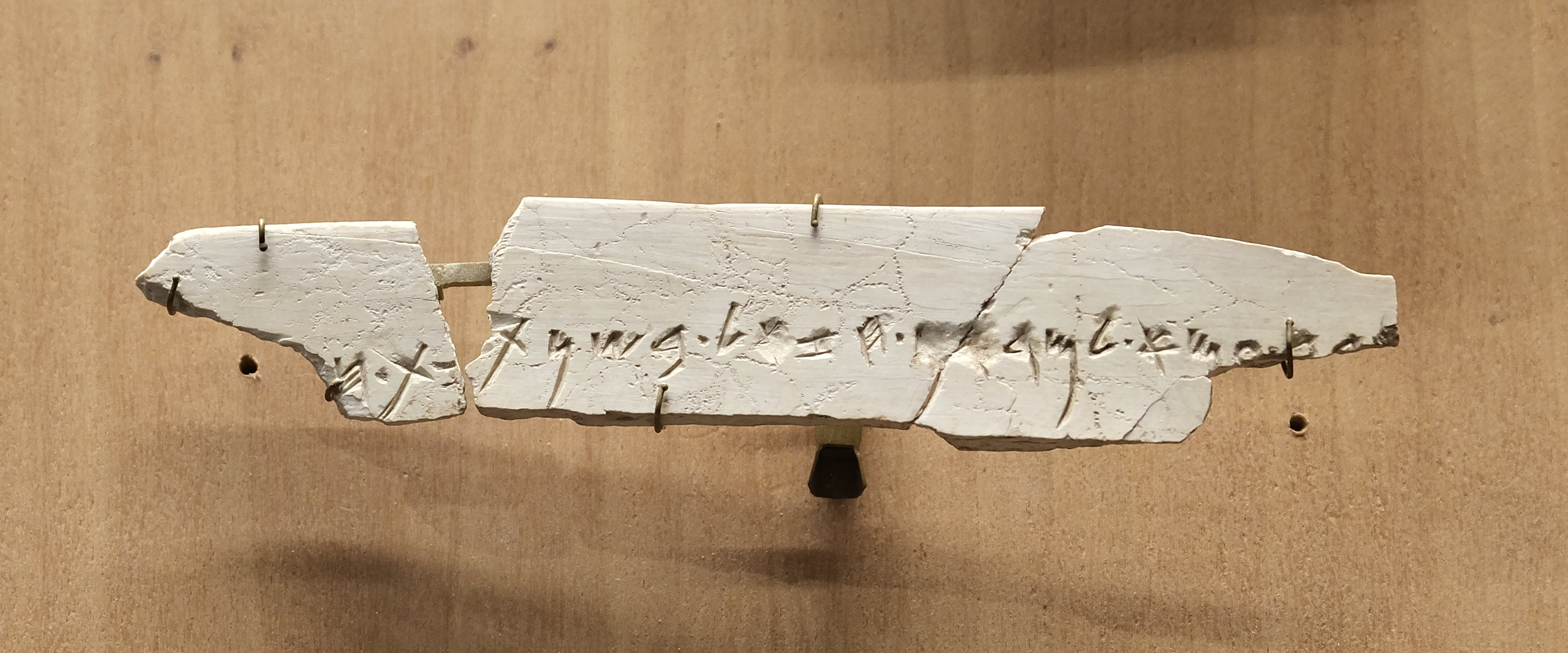
Ivory Plaque Mentioning Hazael in Aramaic language, from Arslan Tash (ancient Hadatu), end of the ninth century B.C.E., now in Louvre (room C, ground floor, Sully Wing, section 4), identification number AO 11489.

But the next day he took a blanket, dipped it in water, and spread it on his face, so that he died. And Hazael reigned in his place.

- "He" refers to Hazael.
- "His" refers to Ben-Hadad.

Hazael (reigns c. 842–800 BCE), seized Israelite territory east of the Jordan River, and the Philistine city of Gath, but unsuccessful to take Jerusalem (2 Kings 12:17–18). His death is mentioned in 2 Kings 13:24. Decorated bronze plaques from chariot horse-harness belonged to Hazael, identified by their inscriptions, have been found as re-gifted votive objects at two Greek sites, the Heraion of Samos and in the temple of Apollo at Eretria on Euboea. The inscriptions read "that which Hadad gave to our lord Hazael from 'Umq in the year that our lord crossed the River", which may refer to Orontes River.

== King Joram of Judah (8:16–24) ==
Joram (or "Jehoram") got the 'harshest possible verdict' among the descendants of David in this book: placed on the same level as the kings of Israel, and especially 'the house of Ahab'. He was married to the Omride princess Athaliah, who was not merely one wife among others, but became the queen mother when her son Ahaziah came to the throne (cf. verses 18 and 26). The tense relationship between Judah and Israel after their separation (cf. e.g. 1 Kings 14:30; 15:16) clearly turned to a peaceful one during the time of the Omri dynasty, along with the northern religious supremacy over the south. The link between Judah and the sinful kingdom of Israel could have brought the kingdom of Judah down, but God in his faithfulness to the Davidic covenant (2 Samuel 7:11–16) mercifully spared them (verse 19). Nevertheless, Judah lost the territory of Edom, after the Edomites heavily defeated Joram's troops and achieved independence (cf. 1 Kings 22:48; 2 Kings 3:8-9).

=== Verse 16 ===
And in the fifth year of Joram the son of Ahab king of Israel, Jehoshaphat being then king of Judah, Jehoram the son of Jehoshaphat king of Judah began to reign.

- "In the fifth year of Joram the son of Ahab": According to Thiele's chronology, following "non-accession year method", between April and September 848 BCE Jehoram the son of Jehoshaphat became the sole king of Judah after being "co-regent" with his father (as the text indicated: "Jehoshaphat being then king of Judah") since September (Tishrei) 854 BCE.

=== Verse 17 ===
He was thirty-two years old when he became king, and he reigned eight years in Jerusalem.

- Cross references: 2 Chronicles 21:5, 20
- "He reigned eight years": based on Thiele-McFall calculation, Jehoram of Judah reigned from between April and September 848 BCE until his death between April and September 841 BCE. Unlike with his predecessors, Jehoram's reign is counted using the 'non-accession year method', which is commonly used only by the kings of the northern kingdom.

== King Ahaziah of Judah (8:25–29) ==
Ahaziah is depicted as bad as his father Joram (and his mother, the Omride Athaliah), although he only reigned for one year. He was soon involved in a war with Aram, in alliance with his uncle, Jehoram of Israel, centered upon Ramoth, a town on the border between Israelite Gilead and Aram's territory to the north ('Israel had been on guard at Ramoth-gilead against King Hazael' in 9:14). The repeated reports of 8:28–29 in 9:14–15a, and in 9:16 may indicate that the narrative could stem from three different sources: the annals of Judah and Israel, as well as a separate record on Jehu.

=== Verse 25 ===
In the twelfth year of Joram the son of Ahab, king of Israel, Ahaziah the son of Jehoram, king of Judah, began to reign.

- "In the twelfth year of Joram the son of Ahab": following the non-accession year method, Thiele calculates that Ahaziah the son of Jehoram of Judah became the sole king of Judah between April and September 841 BCE after the death of his father. 2 Kings 9:29 provides the information that Ahaziah was already a co-regent with his father since the year before ("the 11th year of Joram the son of Ahab") in the month of Tishrei (September) 842 BCE. The mention of "11th year" and "12th year" gives Thiele the initial clue on how to unravel the chronology of the Hebrew kings.

=== Verse 26 ===
Ahaziah was twenty-two years old when he began to reign, and he reigned one year in Jerusalem. His mother's name was Athaliah; she was a granddaughter of Omri king of Israel.

- "He reigned one year": based on Thiele-McFall calculation Ahaziah started to be a sole king of Judah between April and September 841 BCE and died in the same period of his first year as king (following the non-accession year method).
- "Granddaughter": from Hebrew בַּת (bat), lit. “daughter,” but also can refer to a granddaughter like here.

=== Verse 28 ===
He went with Joram the son of Ahab to the war against Hazael king of Aram at Ramoth Gilead, and the Arameans struck Joram.

The inscription by Hazael the king of Aram (Syria) in the Tel Dan Stele stated that after the death of his father 'the king of Israel invaded, advancing in my father's land' (lines 3–4). It corresponds well with 2 Kings 8:28a stating that the kings of Israel and Judah launched a campaign and attacked the Aramaeans at Ramoth-gilead. The city was soon occupied by Hazael for the whole period of his reign, but would be in Israelite hands again thereafter (cf. 2 Kings 13:25; 14:25, 28; Amos 6:13).

=== Verse 29 ===
And King Joram returned to be healed in Jezreel of the wounds that the Syrians had given him at Ramah, when he fought against Hazael king of Syria. And Ahaziah the son of Jehoram king of Judah went down to see Joram the son of Ahab in Jezreel, because he was sick.

- "Ramah": same as "Ramoth" in 8:28.

== Relation to the Tel Dan Stele ==
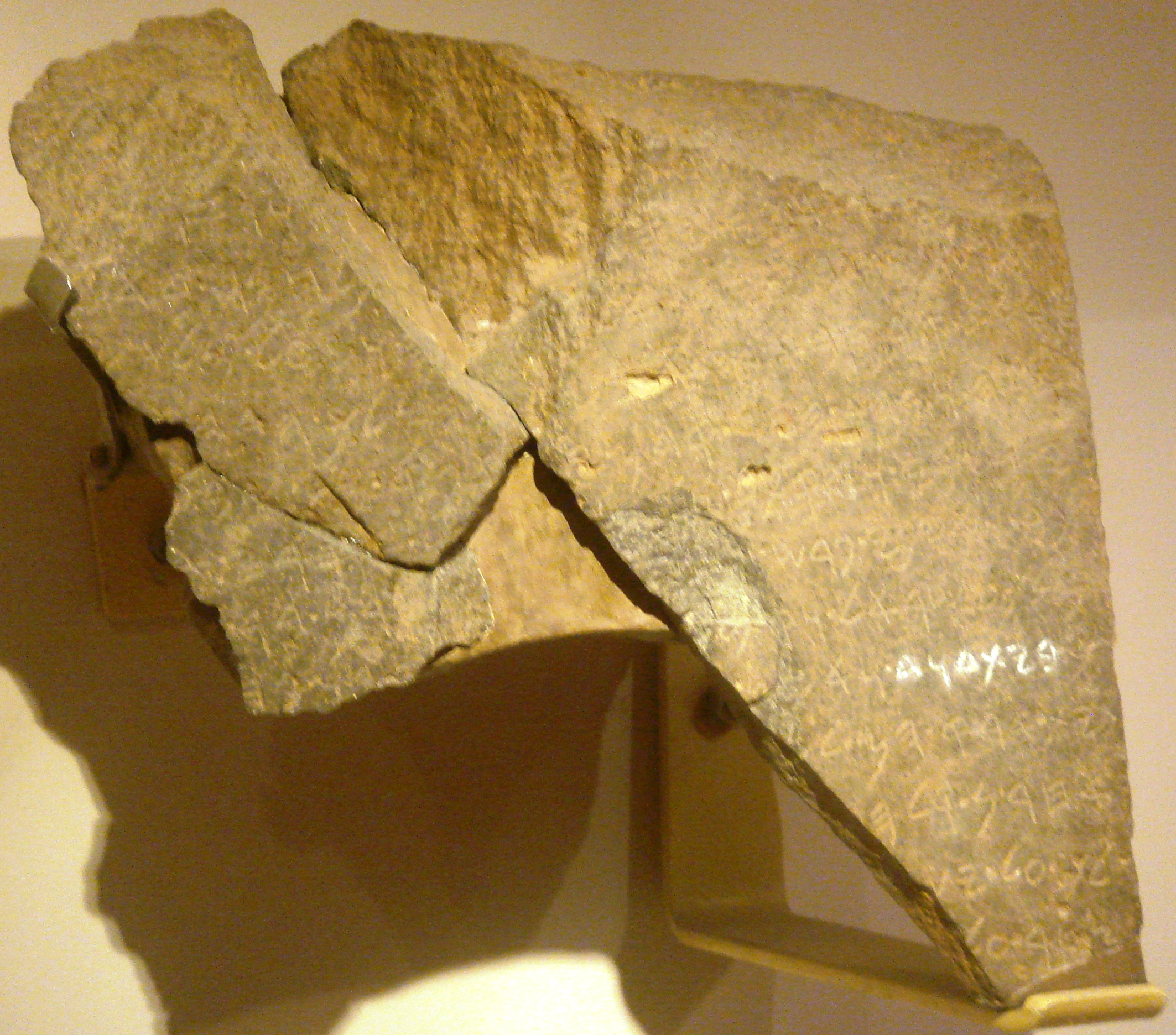
Tel Dan Stele (9th century BCE) at the Israel Museum. Highlighted in white: the sequence BYTDWD ("House of David").

Tel Dan Stele, a fragmentary stele from the 9th century BCE was discovered in 1993 (first fragment) and 1994 (two smaller fragments) in Tel-Dan. The stele contains several lines of Aramaic detailing that the author of the inscription (likely Hazael, an Aramean king from the same period) killed both Jehoram, the son of Ahab, king of Israel, and Ahaziah, the son of Jehoram, the king of the house of David. This artifact is currently on display at the Israel Museum, and is known as KAI 310.

Although the part containing the name of the Israelite king is not complete, the only king, either of Israel or of Judah, whose name ends with resh and mem is Jehoram, who is either a son of Ahab, king of Israel, or a son of Jehoshaphat, king of Judah. The letters y-h-u, followed by b-n, 'the son of', must belong to a Hebrew theophorous name and in the ninth century BCE, the two royal names ending with -yah(u)" were Ahazyah(u)" (Ahaziah) and "Atalyah(u)" (Ataliah; becoming queen of Judah after her son Ahaziah), so the only name of the king is Ahaziah. The name “Ahaziah” can refer to a king of Israel and a king of Judah, but only one can be taken into consideration: the son of Jehoram and grandson of Jehoshaphat, who ruled in Judah for one year (2 Kings 8:25–26) and was the ally of Jehoram of Israel. After Hazael seized the throne from Ben Hadad II, king of Aram-Damascus, he fought Jehoram of Israel and Ahaziah of Judah at Ramoth Gilead (2 Kings 8:7-15, 28; 2 Chronicles 22:5) and wounded Jehoram (according to 2 Kings 9:24–28, both Jehoram and Ahaziah were slain by Jehu shortly after). Thus, this stele is to be attributed to the campaign of Hazael.

== See also ==
- Damascus
- Jezreel
- Omrides
- Philistines
- Ramoth-Gilead
- Shunem
- Related Bible parts:2 Kings 2, 2 Kings 4, 2 Chronicles 21

== Sources ==
- Cohn, Robert L. (2000). Cotter, David W.; Walsh, Jerome T.; Franke, Chris (eds.). 2 Kings. Berit Olam (The Everlasting Covenant): Studies In Hebrew Narrative And Poetry. Liturgical Press. ISBN 9780814650547.
- Collins, John J. (2014). "Chapter 14: 1 Kings 12 – 2 Kings 25". Introduction to the Hebrew Scriptures. Fortress Press. pp. 277–296. ISBN 9781451469233.
- Coogan, Michael David (2007). Coogan, Michael David; Brettler, Marc Zvi; Newsom, Carol Ann; Perkins, Pheme (eds.). The New Oxford Annotated Bible with the Apocryphal/Deuterocanonical Books: New Revised Standard Version, Issue 48 (Augmented 3rd ed.). Oxford University Press. ISBN 9780195288810.
- Dietrich, Walter (2007). "13. 1 and 2 Kings". In Barton, John; Muddiman, John (eds.). The Oxford Bible Commentary (first (paperback) ed.). Oxford University Press. pp. 232–266. ISBN 978-0199277186.
- Halley, Henry H. (1965). Halley's Bible Handbook: an abbreviated Bible commentary (24th (revised) ed.). Zondervan Publishing House. ISBN 0-310-25720-4.
- Leithart, Peter J. (2006). 1 & 2 Kings. Brazos Theological Commentary on the Bible. Brazos Press. ISBN 978-1587431258.
- McFall, Leslie (1991), "Translation Guide to the Chronological Data in Kings and Chronicles" (PDF), Bibliotheca Sacra, 148: 3–45, archived from the original (PDF) on 2010-08-27
- McKane, William (1993). "Kings, Book of". In Metzger, Bruce M; Coogan, Michael D (eds.). The Oxford Companion to the Bible. Oxford University Press. pp. 409–413. ISBN 978-0195046458.
- Thiele, Edwin R. (1983). The Mysterious Numbers of the Hebrew Kings (3rd ed.). Grand Rapids, Michigan: Zondervan. ISBN 978-0-310-36010-0.
- Würthwein, Ernst (1995). The Text of the Old Testament. Translated by Rhodes, Erroll F. Grand Rapids, MI: Wm. B. Eerdmans. ISBN 0-8028-0788-7.
