= 2 Kings 7 =

2 Kings, chapter 7

- ← chapter 6 chapter 8 →
- The pages containing the Books of Kings (1 & 2 Kings) Leningrad Codex (1008 CE).
- Book: Second Book of Kings
- Hebrew Bible part: Nevi'im
- Order in the Hebrew part: 4
- Category: Former Prophets
- Christian Bible part: Old Testament
- Order in the Christian part: 12

2 Kings 7 is the seventh chapter of the second part of the Books of Kings in the Hebrew Bible or the Second Book of Kings in the Old Testament of the Christian Bible. The book is a compilation of various annals recording the acts of the kings of Israel and Judah by a Deuteronomic compiler in the seventh century BCE, with a supplement added in the sixth century BCE. This chapter records the fulfillment of Elisha's prophecy during the siege of Arameans on Samaria.

== Text ==
This chapter was originally written in the Hebrew language. It is divided into 20 verses.

=== Textual witnesses ===
Some early manuscripts containing the text of this chapter in Hebrew are of the Masoretic Text tradition, which includes the Codex Cairensis (895), Aleppo Codex (10th century), and Codex Leningradensis (1008). Fragments containing parts of this chapter in Hebrew were found among the Dead Sea Scrolls, that is, 6Q4 (6QpapKgs; 150–75 BCE) with extant verses 8–10, 20.

There is also a translation into Koine Greek known as the Septuagint, made in the last few centuries BCE. Extant ancient manuscripts of the Septuagint version include Codex Vaticanus (B; $\mathfrak{G}$^{B}; 4th century) and Codex Alexandrinus (A; $\mathfrak{G}$^{A}; 5th century). (Note: The whole book of 2 Kings is missing from the extant Codex Sinaiticus.)

== Elisha’s prophecy of plenty (7:1–2) ==
Facing the death threat from the Israelite king (2 Kings 6), Elisha attacked back using a prophecy from God that good-quality food would be available at normal prices within one day (verse 1). When the king's adviser showed doubts over the hardly imaginable salvation under the circumstances, Elisha even proclaimed a woeful prophecy against him (verse 2). The king's silence seems to indicate that he was ready to give Elisha one final chance.

=== Verse 1 ===
Then Elisha said, "Hear the word of the Lord. Thus says the Lord: 'Tomorrow about this time a seah of fine flour shall be sold for a shekel, and two seahs of barley for a shekel, at the gate of Samaria."

- "Seah": A third of an ephah, or about 8 gallons. Likely about 12 pounds or 5.5 kilograms of flour (also in verses 16 and 18).
- "Shekel": was about 0.4 ounce or 11 or 12 grams, also in verses 16 and 18.
- "Two seahs": likely about 20 pounds or 9 kilograms of barley, also in verses 16 and 18.

== Syrians flee (7:3–15) ==
The narrative's dramatic climax starts with four lepers, who stood daily at the city gates, rejected and avoided by other city inhabitants, going to the Aramean encampment and becoming the first to witness the sudden retreat of the big army, but instead of taking personal advantage of the situation they decided to announce the news to state officials (verses 3–11; a wonderful precursor to Jesus' recognition that God loves making the last first; cf. Mark 10:31ff). An information was supplied (what the lepers did not know) that God brought hallucinations to the Arameans, convincing them that great Egyptian and Hittite armies advanced to attack, thus forcing them to break off the siege immediately (verses 6–7). The Israelite king suspected a trick (verse 12; cf. a very similar scene in 2 Kings 3:23–24), but finally sent people to investigate the situation and found the Arameans' eastward retreat toward the Jordan leaving their weapons and goods in panic (verses 13–15).

== Elisha’s prophecy fulfilled (7:16–20) ==
The report about Arameans' retreat triggered the people to enter the camp close to the city and take possession of their provisions, causing food prices to sink to the level forecast by Elisha (verse 16). The story ended with the fate of the doubting adviser who saw the prophecy fulfilled but was trampled to death before he could enjoy the victory (verses 17–20). Verse 19 quotes the words of the officer and the prophet Elisha to clarify the fulfillment of the prophecy.

== See also ==
- Aram
- Israel
- Prophet
- Samaria
- Syria
- Related Bible parts: 2 Kings 4, 2 Kings 6

== Sources ==
- Cogan, Mordechai; Tadmor, Hayim (1988). II Kings: A New Translation. Anchor Yale Bible Commentaries. Vol. 11. Doubleday. ISBN 9780385023887.
- Collins, John J. (2014). "Chapter 14: 1 Kings 12 – 2 Kings 25". Introduction to the Hebrew Scriptures. Fortress Press. pp. 277–296. ISBN 9781451469233.
- Coogan, Michael David (2007). Coogan, Michael David; Brettler, Marc Zvi; Newsom, Carol Ann; Perkins, Pheme (eds.). The New Oxford Annotated Bible with the Apocryphal/Deuterocanonical Books: New Revised Standard Version, Issue 48 (Augmented 3rd ed.). Oxford University Press. ISBN 9780195288810.
- Dietrich, Walter (2007). "13. 1 and 2 Kings". In Barton, John; Muddiman, John (eds.). The Oxford Bible Commentary (first (paperback) ed.). Oxford University Press. pp. 232–266. ISBN 978-0199277186.
- Fretheim, Terence E (1997). First and Second Kings. Westminster John Knox Press. ISBN 978-0-664-25565-7.
- Halley, Henry H. (1965). Halley's Bible Handbook: an abbreviated Bible commentary (24th (revised) ed.). Zondervan Publishing House. ISBN 0-310-25720-4.
- Huey, F. B. (1993). The New American Commentary - Jeremiah, Lamentations: An Exegetical and Theological Exposition of Holy Scripture, NIV Text. B&H Publishing Group. ISBN 9780805401165.
- Leithart, Peter J. (2006). 1 & 2 Kings. Brazos Theological Commentary on the Bible. Brazos Press. ISBN 978-1587431258.
- McFall, Leslie (1991), "Translation Guide to the Chronological Data in Kings and Chronicles" (PDF), Bibliotheca Sacra, 148: 3–45, archived from the original (PDF) on August 27, 2010
- McKane, William (1993). "Kings, Book of". In Metzger, Bruce M; Coogan, Michael D (eds.). The Oxford Companion to the Bible. Oxford University Press. pp. 409–413. ISBN 978-0195046458.
- Nelson, Richard Donald (1987). First and Second Kings. Westminster John Knox Press. ISBN 978-0-664-22084-6.
- Pritchard, James B (1969). Ancient Near Eastern texts relating to the Old Testament (3 ed.). Princeton University Press. ISBN 9780691035031.
- Sweeney, Marvin (2007). I & II Kings: A Commentary. Westminster John Knox Press. ISBN 978-0-664-22084-6.
- Thiele, Edwin R. (1983). The Mysterious Numbers of the Hebrew Kings (3rd ed.). Grand Rapids, Michigan: Zondervan. ISBN 978-0-310-36010-0.
- Würthwein, Ernst (1995). The Text of the Old Testament. Translated by Rhodes, Erroll F. Grand Rapids, MI: Wm. B. Eerdmans. ISBN 0-8028-0788-7.
