= Luke 4 =

- ← chapter 3 chapter 5 →
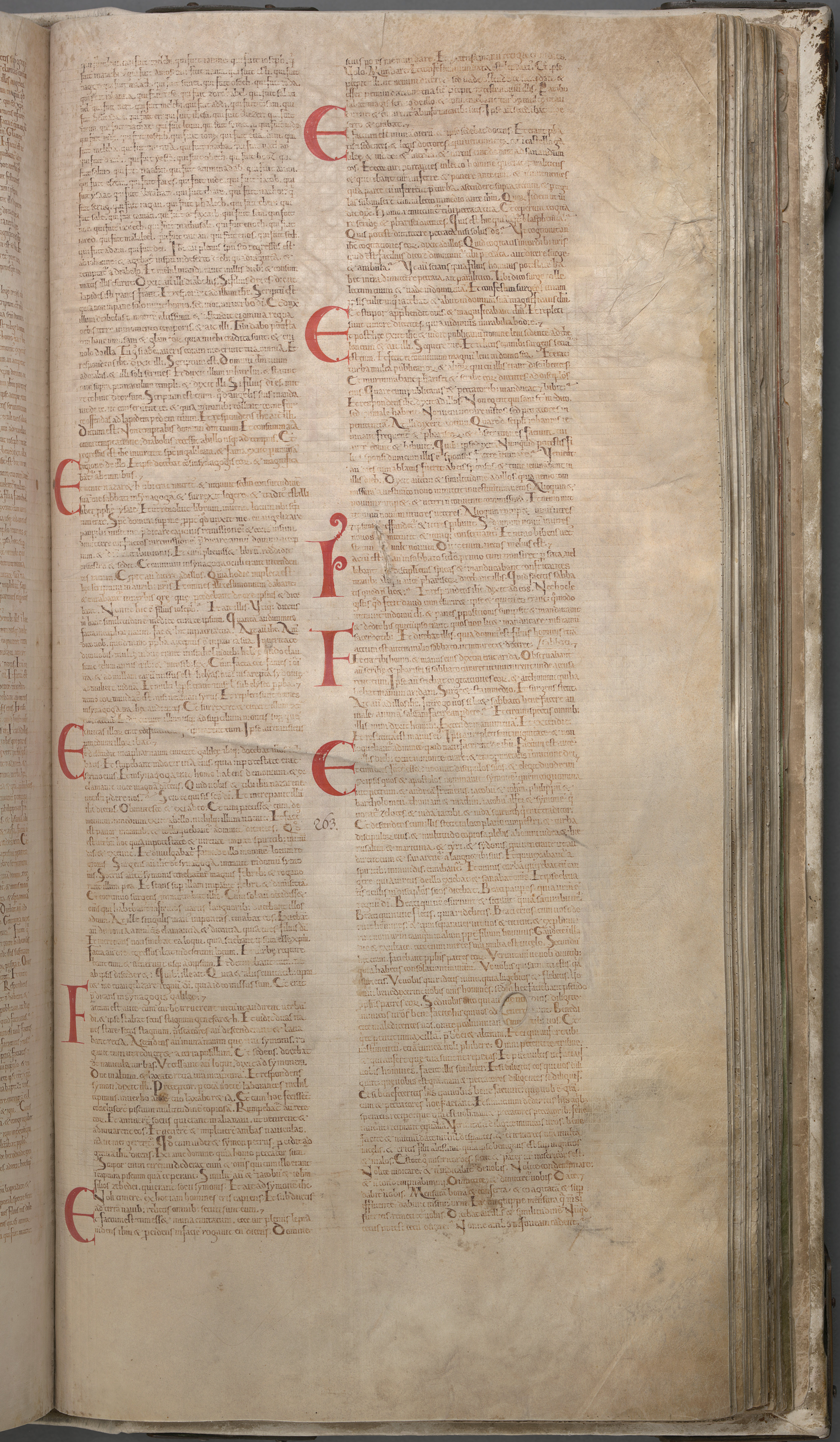
- The Latin text of Luke 3:24–6:39 in Codex Gigas (13th century)
- Book: Gospel of Luke
- Category: Gospel
- Christian Bible part: New Testament
- Order in the Christian part: 3

Luke 4 is the fourth chapter of the Gospel of Luke in the New Testament of the Christian Bible, traditionally attributed to Luke the Evangelist, a companion of Paul the Apostle on his missionary journeys. This chapter details Jesus' three temptations, the start of his "Galilean Ministry", and his rejection at Nazareth, which Luke contrasts with his acclaim in nearby Capernaum.

== Text ==
The original text was written in Koine Greek. This chapter is divided into 44 verses.

=== Textual witnesses ===
Some early manuscripts containing the text of this chapter are:

- Papyrus 4 (AD 150–75; extant verses: 1–2, 29–32, 34–35)
- Codex Vaticanus (325–50)
- Codex Sinaiticus (330–60)
- Codex Bezae (~400)
- Codex Washingtonianus (~400)
- Codex Alexandrinus (400–40)
- Codex Ephraemi Rescriptus (~450; extant verses 26–44)
- Papyrus 7 (4th–6th century; extant verses 1–2)

=== Old Testament references ===
- Luke 4:4: Deuteronomy 8:3
- Luke 4:10–11: Psalm 91:11–12
- Luke 4:18–19: Isaiah 61:–2

== Jesus' three temptations (verses 1–13) ==
Jesus, as in Matthew 4 and Mark 1, travels into the desert, led there by the Spirit, and fasts for forty days. The New American Standard Bible suggests that Jesus was "led around by", or "under the influence of" the Spirit in the wilderness. He is confronted by Satan, who tempts (or tests) him. 'Tested' is the preferred wording of several modern translations, e.g. the Contemporary English Version, Expanded Bible and New Testament for Everyone.

- First, Satan commands him to turn stones into bread. Jesus replies, "Man shall not live by bread alone" (4 RSV), quoting Moses from Deuteronomy 8:3: Man shall not live by bread alone. The words but by every word of God, which reflect the Deuteronomy text (by every word that proceeds from the mouth of the LORD), are added in the Textus Receptus but absent from critical texts of the Greek New Testament.
- Secondly, Satan shows Jesus "...all the kingdoms of the world" (5) and tells him that he can have them all if he falls down and worships him. Jesus replies with a further quote from Deuteronomy 6:13, "It is written: 'You shall worship the Lord your God, and him only shall you serve.'" (8)
- Finally, Satan takes Jesus to the top of the Temple of Jerusalem and quotes Psalm 91:11–12 as a criterion for a test of favor with God, to which Jesus quotes Deuteronomy 6:16, "... You shall not tempt the Lord your God." (12).

This narrative is also found in Matthew 4:1–11, but in Matthew the order of the second and third temptations is reversed. This was most probably in Q if that hypothesis is correct; perhaps their copies of Q were in a different order? This difference in orders presents a challenge for redactional criticism. It is unclear whether in Q, if it existed, the order was originally the same as Luke's and Matthew changed it to have it end on a mountain, a common motif of Matthew, such as Matthew 5:1 and Matthew 28:16, or Luke changed it to have the temptations end in Jerusalem. Luke ends his gospel in Jerusalem in Luke 24. Most scholars believe Matthew's order was the order Q used.

=== Verse 13 ===
Luke then says that Satan left Jesus "for a season" or "until an opportune time". Satan appears later in Luke 22, entering Judas and leading him to betray Jesus. Raymond Brown sees his return in Luke 22:53 when Jesus says to those arresting him "But this is your hour, and the power of darkness". The late 19th-century Anglican cleric Frederic Farrar, in his commentary on Luke for the Cambridge Bible for Schools and Colleges, argues that this does not mean Jesus faced no other temptations during his life, quoting Bonaventure's view that "he endured temptations, too, at other times".

== Jesus returns to Galilee (verses 14–15) ==
Jesus returns to Galilee "in the power of the Spirit", says Luke, and good report spreads locally about him. He teaches in many of the synagogues there. Bede thought that "the power of the Spirit" indicated that Jesus performed miracles from the start of his time back in Galilee; William Robertson Nicoll suggests instead that the words "[imply] a ministry of which no details are here given".

== Rejection at Nazareth (verses 16–30) ==
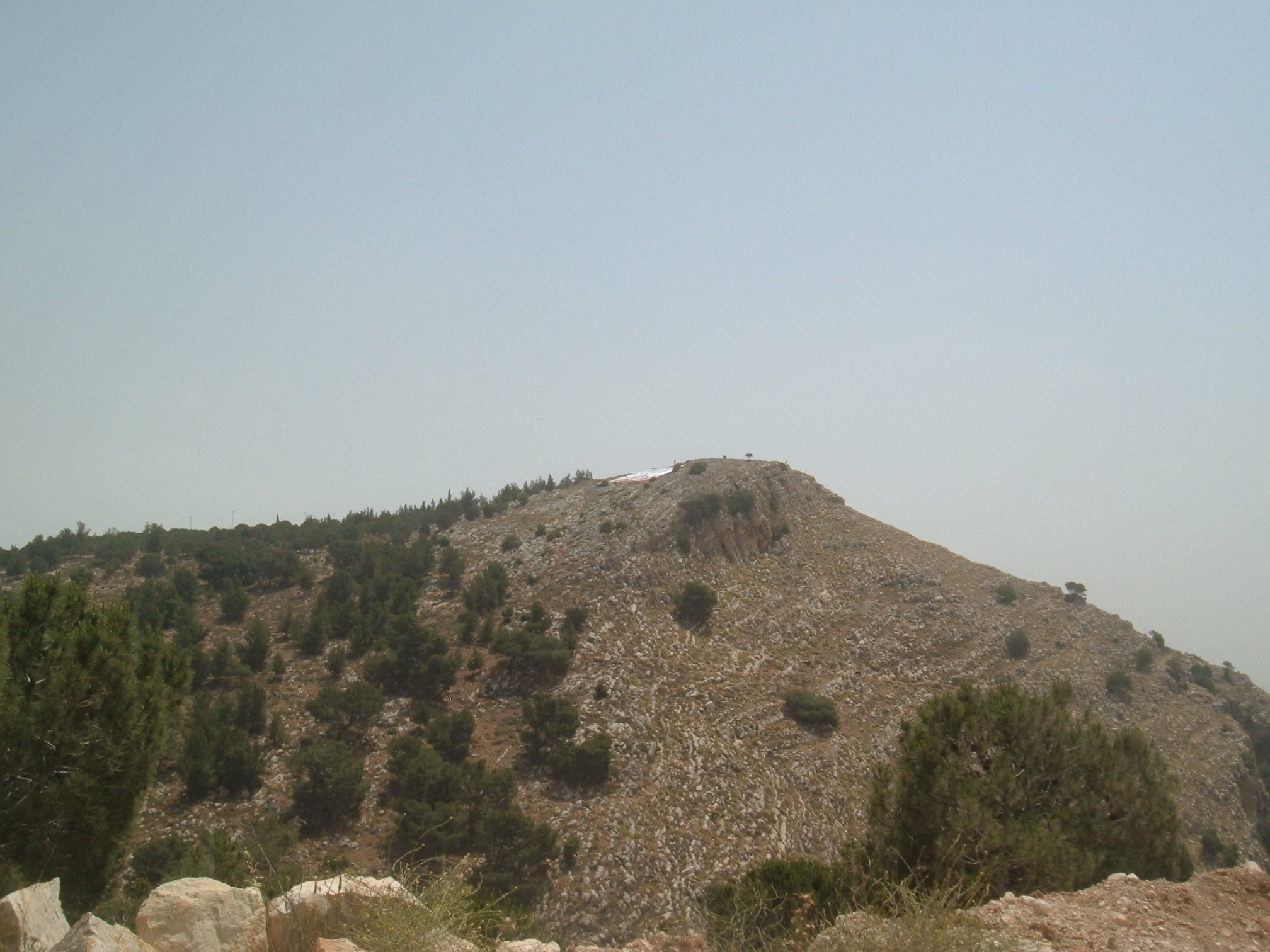
Mount Precipice, Nazareth (photographed in 2009)

On one Sabbath day, "as was his custom", Jesus goes to the synagogue in his hometown of Nazareth, stands up, and reads a section of the Book of Isaiah, Isaiah 61:1–2, referring to himself (verse 21) as the fulfillment of this prophecy. His "custom" may refer to the Jewish custom of attending the synagogue on the Sabbath, or to Jesus' own custom of "frequenting the synagogues since He commenced His mission, for the purpose of expounding the SS. Scriptures". Luke's text uses the Septuagint version of Isaiah, but the version Jesus read would have been written in Hebrew.

The people are amazed at his "gracious words" (Greek: τοις λογοις της χαριτος, tois logois tēs charitos, verse 22), "the discourse of which verse 21 is a compendium", but Jesus goes on to rebuke them, saying "Truly, I say to you... no prophet is acceptable in his hometown."

=== Verses 25–30 ===
^{25}But in truth, I tell you, there were many widows in Israel in the days of Elijah, when the heavens were shut up three years and six months, and a great famine came over all the land, ^{26}and Elijah was sent to none of them but only to Zarephath, in the land of Sidon, to a woman who was a widow.

He tells them how in the time of Elijah only a woman from Sidon (the widow of Zarephath) was saved (verses 25–26, cf 1 Kings 17:7–16), and during the time of Elisha, while there were many lepers in Israel, only a Syrian, Naaman, was healed (verse 27, cf 2 Kings 5:1–19). Outraged, the people attack him and chase him to the top of a hill and try to throw him off, but Jesus slips away through the crowd and continues "on his way". There are many hills in and around Nazareth, although the Upper Galilee region, further to the north, is more mountainous. Traditionally this event has been associated with Mount Precipice (also known as the Mount of Precipitation), some 2 kilometres (1.2 mi) from Nazareth, but scholars now argue that this is unlikely to have been the venue because it is further than a Sabbath day's walk from the city.

Eric Franklin notes that Jesus' continuation "on his way" denotes not just his escape from peril but a movement towards his goal, Luke using the same verb, ἐπορεύετο, eporeueto, as he uses in Luke 9:51, πορευεσθαι, poreuesthai, to indicate his steadfast journey towards Jerusalem.

The event is perhaps also depicted, although not word for word, in Mark 6:1–6 and Matthew 13:53–58, but these accounts do not include the Old Testament examples, and reflect different agendas.

== Teaching and healing (verses 31–41) ==
Jesus goes to Capernaum and exorcises a possessed man in the synagogue, the first of Luke's 21 miracles. He goes to Simon's house and heals his sick mother-in-law. Mark 1 has this after Jesus called his disciples, while Luke puts that event into chapter 5.

He heals more and more people, then retreats to the wilderness for solitary prayer. They come and find him there but he tells them that he must also go to the surrounding towns, where he is to travel and preach the good news of the Kingdom of God, "for I was sent for this purpose". This section, Luke 4:31–44, is almost exactly the same as Mark 1:21–29 and can also be partially found in Matthew 8:14–16. Johann Bengel notes: Here is Jesus’ "Creed": the reason for His many journeyings".

== Jesus preaches in Galilee (verses 42–44) ==
In verse 44, Luke affirms that Jesus continued preaching "in the synagogues of Galilee" (KJV, NKJV). Some ancient manuscripts (א, B, C, L and other uncials) refer to τὰς συναγωγὰς τῆς Ἰουδαίας, tas synagōgas tēs Ioudaias, "the synagogues of Judea". This manuscript tradition is reflected in the Novum Testamentum Graece, and hence in most modern Bible translations, including the RSV, ESV, NRSV, NASB, NAB and NIV.

== See also ==
- Elisha
- Mount of Temptation
- Naaman
- Physician, heal thyself
- Related Bible parts: 2 Kings 5, Psalm 146, Isaiah 61, Matthew 4, Matthew 8, Mark 1

Preceded by Luke 3	Chapters of the Bible; Gospel of Luke	Succeeded by Luke 5
