= Papyrus 7 =

New Testament papyrus fragment of the Gospel of Luke in Greek

Papyrus 𝔓^{7}
- New Testament manuscript
- Text: Luke 4 †
- Date: 4th–6th century AD
- Script: Greek
- Found: Egypt
- Now at: Vernadsky National Library of Ukraine
- Cite: K. Aland, Neue neutestamentliche Papyri, NTS 3 (1957), 261-265
- Type: Alexandrian text-type (?)
- Category: ?

Papyrus 7 (in the Gregory-Aland numbering), or ε 11 (von Soden), designated by 𝔓^{7}, is an early copy of the New Testament in Greek. It is a papyrus manuscript of the Gospel of Luke 4:1-2. Possibly it is a patristic fragment (like e.g. P. Oxy. 405, fragment of Against Heresies by Irenaeus containing Gospel of Matthew 3:16–17). The manuscript had been difficult to date palaeographically, because of its fragmentary condition. It had been assigned to the 4th–6th century (or even the 3rd century).

== Text ==
The Greek text of this codex is too brief to classify (possibly it is a representative of the Alexandrian text-type). Aland did not place it in any of Categories of New Testament manuscripts.

C. R. Gregory examined the manuscript in 1903 in Kiev.

== Location ==
It is currently housed at the Vernadsky National Library of Ukraine (Petrov 553) in Kyiv.

== See also ==
- List of New Testament papyri
- Luke 4
