= 2 Kings 6 =

2 Kings, chapter 6

- ← chapter 5 chapter 7 →
- The pages containing the Books of Kings (1 & 2 Kings) Leningrad Codex (1008 CE).
- Book: Second Book of Kings
- Hebrew Bible part: Nevi'im
- Order in the Hebrew part: 4
- Category: Former Prophets
- Christian Bible part: Old Testament
- Order in the Christian part: 12

2 Kings 6 is the sixth chapter of the second part of the Books of Kings in the Hebrew Bible or the Second Book of Kings in the Old Testament of the Christian Bible. The book is a compilation of various annals recording the acts of the kings of Israel and Judah by a Deuteronomic compiler in the seventh century BC, with a supplement added in the sixth century BCE. This chapter records some miraculous deeds of the prophet Elisha.

== Text ==
This chapter was originally written in the Hebrew language. It is divided into 33 verses.

=== Textual witnesses ===
Some early manuscripts containing the text of this chapter in Hebrew are of the Masoretic Text tradition, which includes the Codex Cairensis (895), Aleppo Codex (10th century), and Codex Leningradensis (1008). A fragment containing a part of this chapter in Hebrew was found among the Dead Sea Scrolls, that is, 6Q4 (6QpapKgs; 150–75 BCE) with the extant verse 32.

There is also a translation into Koine Greek known as the Septuagint, made in the last few centuries BCE. Extant ancient manuscripts of the Septuagint version include Codex Vaticanus (B; $\mathfrak{G}$^{B}; 4th century) and Codex Alexandrinus (A; $\mathfrak{G}$^{A}; 5th century). (Note: The whole book of 2 Kings is missing from the extant Codex Sinaiticus.)

== The axe head recovered (6:1–7) ==
The passage shows how Elisha helped his disciples, even for something seemingly trivial. Elisha's followers lost a borrowed axe in the water (hence an obligation to repay its owner for the loss; cf. Exodus 22:13–14), and the prophet came to help by using "a kind of analogical magic" on the last spot of the axe, before letting the disciple pick it up out of the water. This episode is tied syntactically to the earlier passage by an 'initial waw-consecutive verb' (in "and they said") and thematically by similar emphasis of Elisha's 'divinely granted powers' as well as in its relation to Jordan River.

=== Verse 6 ===
Then the man of God said, “Where did it fall?” When he showed him the place, he cut off a stick and threw it in there and made the iron float.

- "Threw it in there": The stick is thrown on the surface of the water and this clear statement does not fit with the attempted explanations that Elisha actually held a long stick to fish the iron out from the bottom.

== Elisha captures Arameans and subsequently ensures their release (6:8–23) ==
The scene moves to a larger political world, where Aramean troops attacked Israelite territory unhindered, but with the help from the prophet, the Israelite army could avoid falling into their hands several times. The Aramean king (likely Ben-Hadad II; 2 Kings 6:24) could only presume he had been betrayed (verse 11), until he found out that the Israelite king (verse 12, Jehoram) was guided by a 'clairvoyant prophet', so he sent an 'army regiment with horses and chariots' to Dothan (about 15 km. north of Samaria) to arrest Elisha. The prophet's servant saw in despair that the city was completely surrounded, yet Elisha could see a heavenly host with horses and chariots of fire (verse 17) guarding him (referring to Elisha's archaic title: 'chariots of Israel and its horsemen [better: horses]', 2 Kings 13:14). There was no battle with the Arameans, because God 'struck them with blindness' (verse 18), so that Elisha can mock them that the one they seek (which is the prophet himself) was not there, and he led them into his trap, right into the middle of the strongly fortified royal city of Samaria, where the Arameans were now completely surrounded with no escape (verses 19–23). However, Elisha prevented the king (who respectfully called the prophet 'father'; cf. 2 Kings 13:14) from simply killing the helpless prisoners, and instead to feed and release the Arameans (verses 21–22); a humane act which might help to reduce tensions and enmities at the time (verse 23). Initially the narrative refers Elisha as "the man of God" and only later employs his name, emphasizing that the prophet is indeed the man of God.

=== Verse 17 ===
And Elisha prayed, and said, "Lord, I pray, open his eyes that he may see." Then the Lord opened the eyes of the young man, and he saw. And behold, the mountain was full of horses and chariots of fire all around Elisha.

- "Horses and chariots of fire": As fiery chariots and horses separated Elijah from Elisha (2 Kings 2:12), now a similar appearance surrounds and protects Elisha.

== Ben-Hadad besieges Samaria (6:24–33) ==
Despite the kind gesture of 2 Kings 6:23, the Arameans who no longer made plundering raids through the country, now directly besieged the capital, Samaria. Such a siege in ancient times could last for months, even years, in order literally to starve out the people in the city (cf. 2 Kings 17:5; 25:1–2). The attacker is identified as Ben-Hadad II whom Ahab foolishly released in the time of Elijah (1 Kings 20), then later caused Ahab's death (1 Kings 22) and now threatened Ahab's son, Jehoram (as this report appeared within his regnal report in 2 Kings 3:1–8:15).

The narrative displays the increasingly desperate situation: poor-quality food and fuel became extremely expensive (verse 25), ravenous hunger drove people to cannibalism (verses 26–29, cf. also Lamentations 2:20; 4:10), the king was completely powerless and deeply dejected (verses 27, 30). At last, the prophet Elisha was mentioned—not as a possible helper, but as the king's enemy (verses 31–32), because apparently the prophet had encouraged resistance to the enemy and trust in YHWH, and now the king's patience had come to an end and sent messengers to arrest Elisha (verse 33). The location of Elisha's house was presumably in Samaria, not in Dothan, since Samaria was under siege. The presence of some elders in Elisha's house indicates a consultation session regarding oracles from YHWH (cf. Ezekiel 8:1). Elisha called the king as "this son of a murderer", likely recalling the acts of Ahab, the father of the present king Jehoram, in murdering the sons of the prophets (1 Kings 18).

=== Verse 25 ===
And there was a great famine in Samaria, as they besieged it, until a donkey's head was sold for eighty shekels of silver, and the fourth part of a kab of dove's dung for five shekels of silver.

- "80 shekels of silver": about 2 pounds, or 920 grams. A "shekel" was about 0.4 ounce or 11 grams.
- "Kab": was about 1 quart or 1 liter. Likely also about 0.25 pound or 100 grams.
- "5 shekels of silver": about 2 ounces or 58 grams.

== See also ==
- Aram
- Israel
- Prophet
- Samaria
- Syria
- Related Bible parts: 2 Kings 4, 2 Kings 7

== Sources ==
- Cogan, Mordechai; Tadmor, Hayim (1988). II Kings: A New Translation. Anchor Yale Bible Commentaries. Vol. 11. Doubleday. ISBN 9780385023887.
- Collins, John J. (2014). "Chapter 14: 1 Kings 12 – 2 Kings 25". Introduction to the Hebrew Scriptures. Fortress Press. pp. 277–296. ISBN 9781451469233.
- Coogan, Michael David (2007). Coogan, Michael David; Brettler, Marc Zvi; Newsom, Carol Ann; Perkins, Pheme (eds.). The New Oxford Annotated Bible with the Apocryphal/Deuterocanonical Books: New Revised Standard Version, Issue 48 (Augmented 3rd ed.). Oxford University Press. ISBN 9780195288810.
- Dietrich, Walter (2007). "13. 1 and 2 Kings". In Barton, John; Muddiman, John (eds.). The Oxford Bible Commentary (first (paperback) ed.). Oxford University Press. pp. 232–266. ISBN 978-0199277186.
- Fretheim, Terence E (1997). First and Second Kings. Westminster John Knox Press. ISBN 978-0-664-25565-7.
- Halley, Henry H. (1965). Halley's Bible Handbook: an abbreviated Bible commentary (24th (revised) ed.). Zondervan Publishing House. ISBN 0-310-25720-4.
- Huey, F. B. (1993). The New American Commentary - Jeremiah, Lamentations: An Exegetical and Theological Exposition of Holy Scripture, NIV Text. B&H Publishing Group. ISBN 9780805401165.
- Leithart, Peter J. (2006). 1 & 2 Kings. Brazos Theological Commentary on the Bible. Brazos Press. ISBN 978-1587431258.
- McFall, Leslie (1991), "Translation Guide to the Chronological Data in Kings and Chronicles" (PDF), Bibliotheca Sacra, 148: 3–45, archived from the original (PDF) on August 27, 2010
- McKane, William (1993). "Kings, Book of". In Metzger, Bruce M; Coogan, Michael D (eds.). The Oxford Companion to the Bible. Oxford University Press. pp. 409–413. ISBN 978-0195046458.
- Nelson, Richard Donald (1987). First and Second Kings. Westminster John Knox Press. ISBN 978-0-664-22084-6.
- Pritchard, James B (1969). Ancient Near Eastern texts relating to the Old Testament (3 ed.). Princeton University Press. ISBN 9780691035031.
- Sweeney, Marvin (2007). I & II Kings: A Commentary. Westminster John Knox Press. ISBN 978-0-664-22084-6.
- Thiele, Edwin R. (1983). The Mysterious Numbers of the Hebrew Kings (3rd ed.). Grand Rapids, Michigan: Zondervan. ISBN 978-0-310-36010-0.
- Würthwein, Ernst (1995). The Text of the Old Testament. Translated by Rhodes, Erroll F. Grand Rapids, MI: Wm. B. Eerdmans. ISBN 0-8028-0788-7.
