= Aramaism =

Aramaic language element appearing in another language

An Aramaism, less commonly referred to as an Arameanism, an Aramaicism or an Aramism, is a word, expression, phrase, or linguistic feature that originates from Aramaic (one of the Northwest Semitic languages) and appears in another language (particularly Hebrew or Arabic) as a result of historical contact. Aramaisms are a subset of Semitisms, a broader category encompassing elements borrowed from any Semitic language.

== Terminology ==
Features deriving specifically from the Syriac dialect may be more precisely called "Syriacisms". Likewise, features deriving from the Mandaic dialect may be called "Mandaisms" or "Mandaicisms".

The term "Chaldaism" (or "Chaldeeism") is an obsolete label historically used to describe Aramaic features, especially those in Biblical or Talmudic texts, once thought to be "Chaldean" in origin. These are now more accurately classified under Aramaisms, particularly of the Biblical or Jewish Babylonian dialects.

== Historical background ==
Aramaic was widely spoken in the ancient Near East. Due to its prominence as a lingua franca of empires in the region, Aramaic influenced neighboring languages.

== In Hebrew ==
Quoting Avi Hurvitz,

From the post-exilic period onwards, one can readily detect in Hebrew numerous new expressions and linguistic innovations, many of which are due to either direct or indirect Aramaic influence. These neologisms produced fundamental changes in the structure of Biblical Hebrew. However, so called 'Aramaisms' appear sporadically in earlier texts of the Bible as well.

The Book of Genesis contains Aramaisms. The possibility of dating certain parts of the Hebrew Bible based on the presence of Aramaisms in them has been a matter of study.

== In Greek ==
Several Aramaisms are contained in the Greek New Testament, specifically in the Gospel of Mark and the Gospel of Matthew, which have led to Aramaic New Testament hypotheses.

== In Arabic ==
Aramaisms appear in Classical Arabic and in Arabic dialects.

== See also ==
- Aramaic targumim
- Biblical Aramaic
- Semitism (linguistics)

== Sources ==
- Burney, C. F. (2004). The Aramaic Origin of the Fourth Gospel.
- Butler, B. C. (2011) [1951]. The Originality of St Matthew. Cambridge University Press.
- Hurvitz, A. (1968). "The Chronological Significance of 'Aramaisms' in Biblical Hebrew". Israel Exploration Journal. 18 (4): 234–240. JSTOR 27925150.
- Montgomery, James A. (1913). Aramaic Incantation Texts from Nippur. Philadelphia.
- van Bladel, Kevin T. (2017). From Sasanian Mandaeans to Ṣābians of the Marshes.
- Wise, Isaac M. (1880). History of the Hebrews' Second Commonwealth. Cincinnati.
