= Naaman =

Biblical character

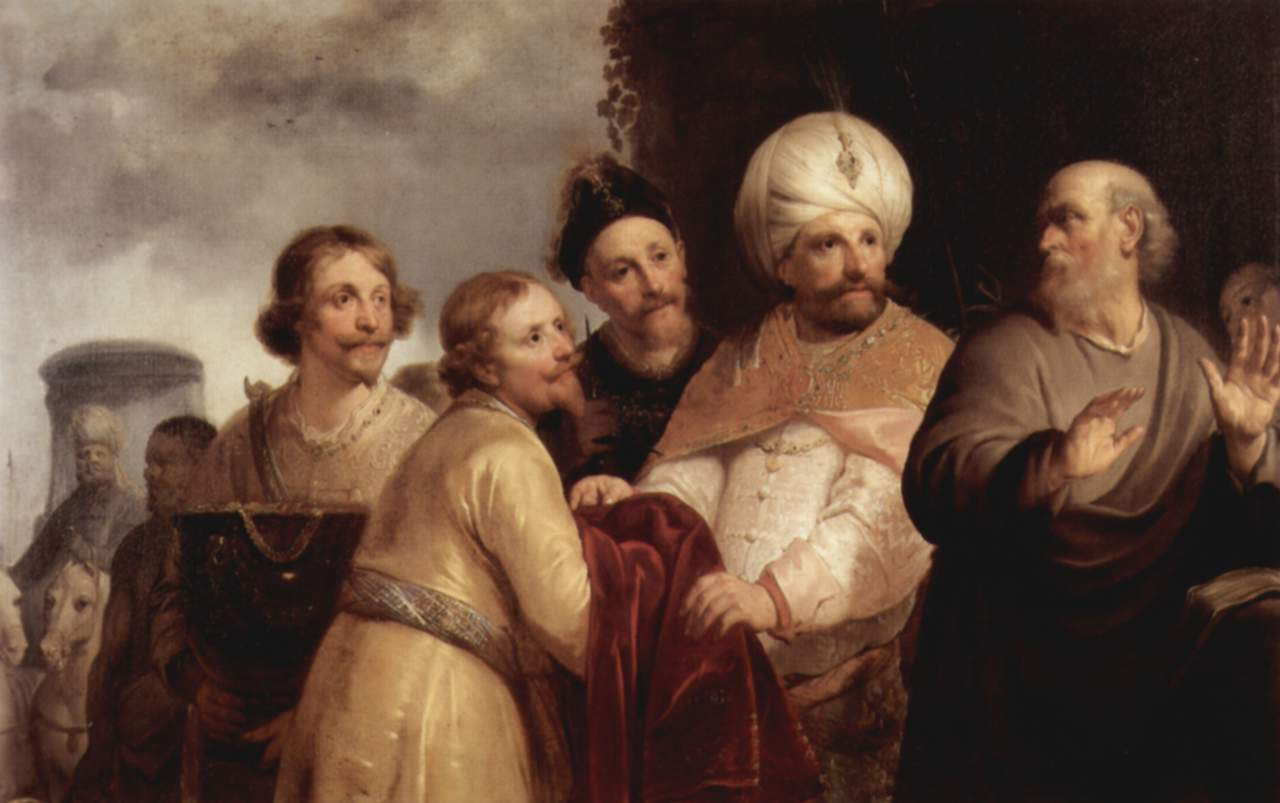
Elisha refusing the gifts of Naaman, by Pieter de Grebber

Naaman the Aramean (Hebrew: נַעֲמָן, romanized: Naʿmān, lit. 'pleasantness') was a commander of the armies of Hadadezer, the king of Aram-Damascus, in the time of Jehoram, King of Northern Israel (Samaria).

According to 2 Kings 5 in the Bible, Naaman was a commander of the army of Aram. He was a good commander and was held in favor because of the victory that God brought him. However, Naaman suffered from tzaraath, a skin disease often translated as "leprosy".

Naaman's wife had a servant girl from the Northern Kingdom of Israel ("Samaria") who said that a prophet there would be able to heal him. Naaman tells his lord this and he is sent to Israel with a letter to the king. The king of Israel did not know what to do and believes the request was the beginning of a plot to start a war, but Elisha sent a message to the King, advising that the King tell Naaman to come to see him. Elisha then told Naaman to go bathe in the Jordan River seven times and he would be clean. Naaman was angry and would have left, but his servant asked him to try it and he was healed.

A servant of Elisha, Gehazi, seeing his master refuse gifts from Naaman, ran after him and falsely asked for clothing and silver for visitors. Tzaraath afflicted Gehazi and would remain in his descendants.

== Tanakh ==
Naaman is mentioned in 2 Kings 5 of the Hebrew Bible as "Naaman, captain of the army of the King of Aram" (וְ֠נַעֲמָן שַׂר־ צְבָ֨א מֶֽלֶךְ־אֲרָ֜ם).

Now Naaman, the general of the king of Aram, was a prominent man before his lord and respected, for through him had the Lord given victory to Aram; and the man was a great warrior, and he was a mezora [מְצֹרָע]. Now the Arameans went out in bands and captured from the land of Israel a young girl, who ministered to Naaman's wife.

— Melachim II, 2 Kings 5:1–2

According to the narrative, he is called a mezora, a person affected by the skin disease tzaraath (Hebrew: צָרַעַת, romanized: ṣāraʿaṯ). Often translated as leprosy, this illness or affliction, was not today's leprosy. Leprosy as known today did not come to Israel until 327 to 325 BCE, after the return of the troops after the Indian campaign of Alexander the Great. When the Hebrew slave-girl who waits on his wife tells her of a Jewish prophet in Samaria who can cure her master, he obtains a letter from the King of Aram to King Jehoram, in which the Aramean king asks Jehoram to arrange for the healing of his subject Naaman. Naaman proceeds with the letter to King Jehoram. The king of Israel suspects in this impossible request a pretext of Aram for later starting a war against him and tears his clothes.

When the prophet Elisha hears about this, he sends for Naaman. Rather than personally receiving Naaman when the latter arrives at Elisha's house, Elisha merely sends a messenger to the door who tells Naaman to cure the tsaraath by dipping himself seven times in the Jordan River. Naaman had expected the prophet himself to come out to him and to perform some kind of impressive ritual magic; he angrily refuses and prepares to go home unhealed. Only after Naaman's slaves suggest to their master that he has nothing to lose by at least giving it a try since the task is a simple and easy one, he takes his bath in the Jordan River as a mikveh and finds himself healed.

Naaman returns to Elisha with lavish gifts, which Elisha flatly refuses to accept. Naaman also renounces his former god Rimmon after being cured by Elisha, acknowledging only the God of Israel. He does, however, ask for soil from a mizbeḥ (a sacrificial altar from an Israelite temple) to be given him to take back home and that the God of Israel pardon him when he enters the temple of Rimmon as part of his obligations to the King of Aram.

== Rabbinic literature ==
According to Rabbinic teaching, Naaman was the archer who drew his bow at a venture and mortally wounded Ahab, King of Northern Israel. This event is alluded to in 2 Kings 5:1: "for through him GOD had granted victory to Aram" (2 Kings 5:1), and therefore the Aramean king, Naaman's master, was Hadadezer. Naaman is represented as vain and haughty, on account of which he was stricken with leprosy. Tanhuma says that Naaman was stricken with leprosy for taking an Israelite maiden and making her his wife's servant. Naaman is understood as Moab in the expression "Moab would be my washbasin" in Psalm 60 (Psalms 60:10), which the Rabbis regard as an allusion to Naaman's bathing in the Jordan; the appellation "Moab" is a play on the word "abi" (= "my father"), by which Naaman was addressed by his servants in 2 Kings 5:13. Naaman was a ger toshav, not a perfect proselyte, having accepted only some of the commandments. The Mekhilta of Rabbi Ishmael, however, places Naaman's conversion above Jethro's.

As the object of the narrative of Naaman's sickness and restoration to health is, apparently, to form a link in the long series of miracles performed by Elisha, the redactor of II Kings did not concern himself to indicate the time when this event occurred. The rabbinical tradition that Naaman was the archer (1 Kings 22:34) who mortally wounded Ahab seems to have been adopted by Josephus. If the tradition is correct, the king Naaman served must have been Hadadezer, but since the interval between the death of Ahab and the curing of Naaman's leprosy is not known, it is impossible to identify the king to whom Naaman was sent with a letter. Ewald thinks the king referred to was Jehoahaz, while Schenkel suggests Jehu, but the general view is that it was Jehoram. The passage "for through him GOD had granted victory to Aram" (II Kings 5:1) upon which the identification of Naaman with Ahab's slayer is based by the Chazal is referred by G. Rawlinson, however, to the triumph over Shalmaneser III in the Battle of Qarqar by an alliance of Aramean and Arab states led by Hadadezer.

== New Testament ==
Naaman is also mentioned in Luke 4:27 of the New Testament, in Greek as "Ναιμὰν ὁ Σύρος" or "Naaman the Syrian", a leper.

There were also many lepers in Israel in the time of the prophet Elisha, and none of them was cleansed except Naaman the Syrian.’

— Jesus Christ, Luke 4:27

Christian theology depicts Naaman as an example for the will of God to save people who are considered by men as less than pious and unworthy of salvation. The Septuagint, the Greek Old Testament, uses the word baptizein for the dipping that heals the heathen Naaman from the skin disease called tzaraath. The new baptism takes place in the Jordan River where Jesus of Nazareth, also called the Christ by his followers, was baptized many centuries later.

== See also ==
- Gehazi
- Naamah (disambiguation)
- Nu'man
