= Gehazi =

Biblical figure (Second Book of Kings)

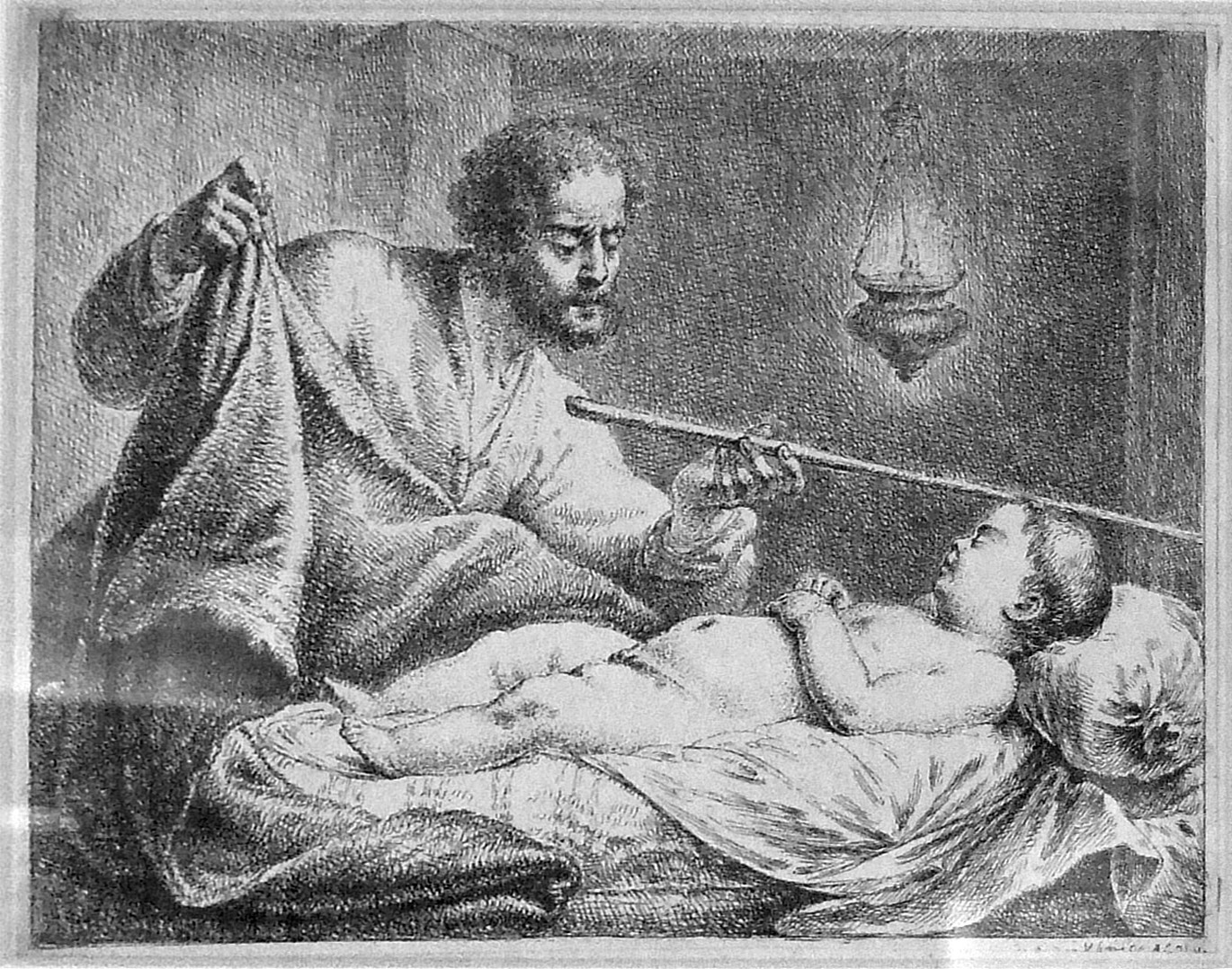
Gehazi attempts to awaken the son of the Shunammite woman with the staff of Elisha.

Gehazi, Geichazi, or Giezi (Douay-Rheims) (Hebrew: גֵּיחֲזִי; Gēḥăzī; "valley of vision") is a figure found in the Books of Kings in the Hebrew Bible.

A servant of the prophet Elisha, Gehazi enjoyed a position of power but was ultimately corrupt, misusing his authority to cheat Naaman the Syrian, a general afflicted with leprosy. As punishment, Elisha cursed Gehazi, transferring Naaman's leprosy to him and his descendants.

In Rabbinic literature, Gehazi is identified as one of the four commoners who forfeited his share in the afterlife because of his wickedness. He is the subject of a poem by Rudyard Kipling.

== Etymology ==
Two meanings for the name "Gehazi" have been suggested: "valley of vision" or "valley of avarice".

== Biblical account ==
Gehazi was the servant of the prophet Elisha. He appears in connection with the history of the Shunammite woman and her son and of Naaman the Syrian. On the latter occasion, Gehazi, overcome with avarice, obtained two talents of silver and two valuable robes from Naaman in the prophet's name. Consequently, he was guilty of duplicity and dishonesty of conduct, causing Elisha to denounce his crime with righteous sternness and determine that "the leprosy of Naaman would cleave to him and his descendants forever." After Elisha cursed Gehazi, Gehazi became leprous, "as white as snow" (2 Kings 5:27).

Later in the biblical narrative, he appeared before King Joram, to whom he recounted the great deeds of his master. The Cambridge Bible for Schools and Colleges suggests that "it is probable that the accounts of Elisha’s work and influence are not related [in 2 Kings] in their chronological order"; the Biblical commentator Andrew Fausset, in his Bible Dictionary, however, concludes that this sequence of events represents Gehazi's subsequent repentance in light of his affliction and the removal of the leprosy, as being "a more likely solution than supposing that this incident occurred before Gehazi's leprosy and has been transposed".

== In rabbinic literature ==
In Rabbinic literature, Gehazi is one of those who deny the resurrection of the dead, have no portion in the world to come, but share the doom of Balaam, Doeg, and Ahithophel. On the way to Shunem with Elisha's staff, Gehazi proved himself to be a skeptic concerning the resurrection. He considered the whole procedure a joke, and instead of obeying the order not to address even one word to any passer-by, nor return any salutation, he asked derisively of those he met whether they believed the staff had the power to restore the dead to life. For this reason, he failed.

In other ways, too, Gehazi displayed a mean character, as, for instance, in his behavior toward the Shunammite woman; he drove away Elisha's disciples; he possessed a magnet by which he lifted up the idol made by Jeroboam so that it was seen between heaven and earth; he had "Yhwh" engraved on it, and in consequence the idol (a calf) pronounced the first two words of the Decalogue. When Naaman went to Elisha, the latter was studying the passage concerning the eight unclean "sheraẓim" (creeping things). Therefore, when Gehazi returned after inducing Naaman to give him presents, Elisha, in his rebuke, enumerated eight precious things that Gehazi had taken and told him that it was time for him to take the punishment prescribed for one who catches any of the eight sheraẓim, the punishment being in his case leprosy. The four lepers at the gate announcing Sennacherib's defeat were Gehazi and his three sons.

Nevertheless, Elisha is censured for having been too severe. He "thrust him away with both hands" instead of using one for that purpose and the other for drawing him toward himself. Elisha went to Damascus to induce Gehazi to repent, but Gehazi refused, quoting his master's own teachings to the effect that a sinner who had led others into sin had no hope. Gehazi was interrupted in his conversation with the king because a sinner should not sing the praises of a holy man. He had been disrespectful to his teacher, calling him by name. His character is said to have been that of a man who, though learned, was jealous avaricious, unchaste and cynical.

== In later literature ==
He is ostensibly the subject of Rudyard Kipling's poem Gehazi, thought to be aimed at Rufus Isaacs, a member of the British Liberal government at the time the poem was composed.

Gehazi also appears in John Bunyan's Pilgrim's Progress.
