= List of manuscripts from Qumran Cave 6 =

List of the manuscripts from Qumran Cave 6
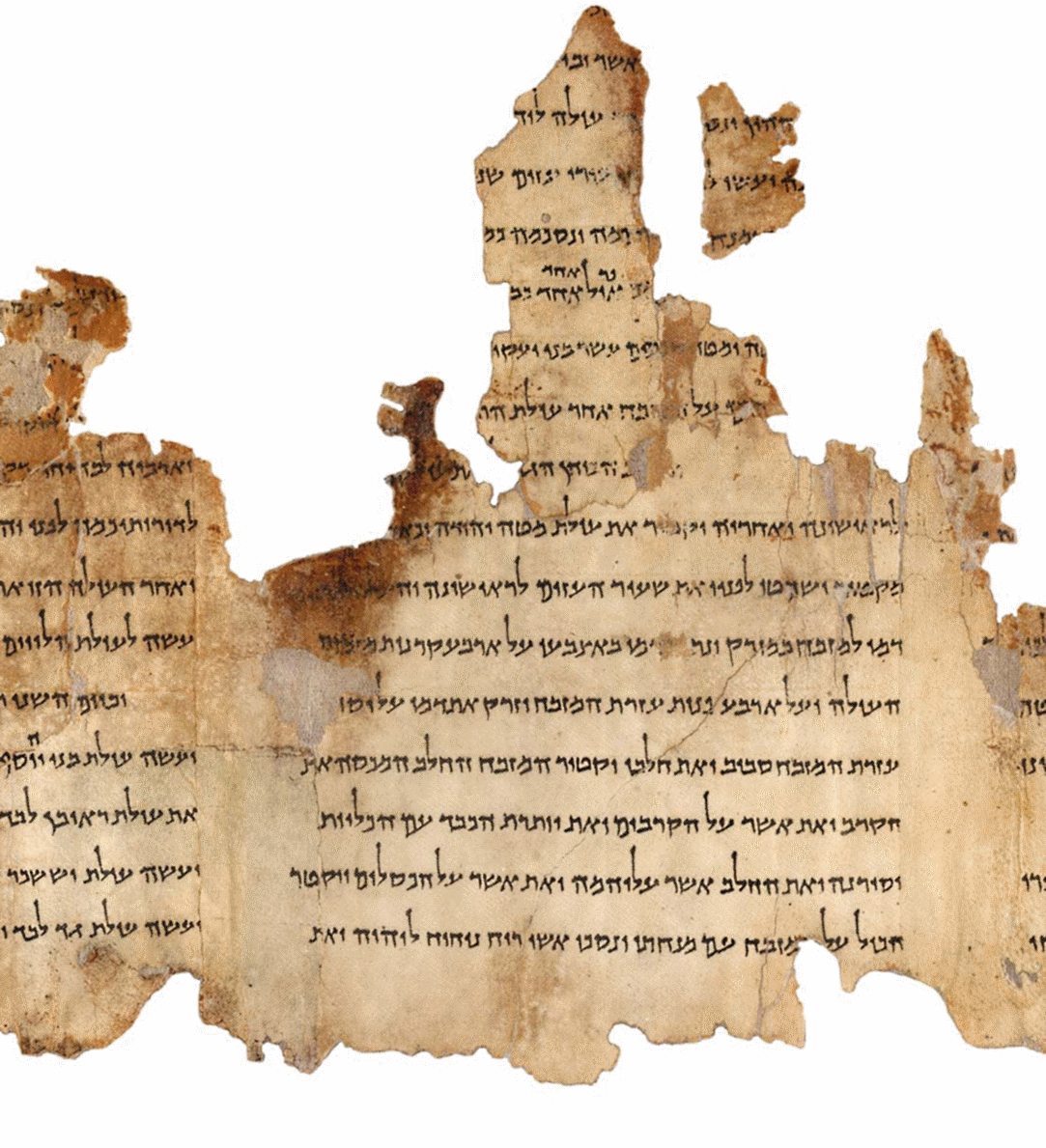
- A view of part of the Temple Scroll that was found in Qumran Cave 11.
- Material: Parchment
- Writing: Hebrew
- Created: Est. 408 BCE to 318 CE
- Discovered: 1952
- Present location: Qumran

The following is a list of the Dead Sea Scrolls from the cave 6 near Qumran.

== Description ==
Wadi Qumran Cave 6 was discovered alongside Cave 5 in 1952, shortly after the discovery of Cave 4. Cave 6 contained fragments of about 31 manuscripts.

== List of manuscripts ==
Some resources for more complete information on the Dead Sea Scrolls are the book by Emanuel Tov, "Revised Lists of the Texts from the Judaean Desert" for a complete list of all of the Dead Sea Scroll texts, as well as the online webpages for the Shrine of the Book and the Leon Levy Collection, both of which present photographs and images of the scrolls and fragments themselves for closer study. Information is not always comprehensive, as content for many scrolls has not yet been fully published.

Fragment or scroll identifier	Fragment or scroll name	Alternative identifier	English Bible Association	Language	Date/script	Description	Reference
Qumran Cave 6
6QpaleoGen	Genesis	6Q1	Genesis 6:13–21	Hebrew	Early Hellenistic; Palaeo-Hebrew script		
6QpaleoLev	Leviticus	6Q2	Leviticus 8:12–13	Hebrew	Early Hellenistic; Palaeo-Hebrew script		
pap6QDeut or 6QpapDeut(?)	Deuteronomy	6Q3	Deuteronomy 26:19	Hebrew	Hellenistic-Roman	A few letters of Deuteronomy 26:19 on papyrus	
6QpapKgs	Kings	6Q4	1 Kings 3:12–14; 12:28–31; 22:28–31; 2 Kings 5:26; 6:32; 7:8–10,20; 8:1–5; 9:1–2; 10:19–21	Hebrew	Hasmonean	Made up of 94 Fragments.	
pap6QPs or 6QpapPs(?)	Psalms	6Q5	Psalm 78:36–37	Hebrew	Herodian		
6QCant	Song of Songs	6Q6	Song of Songs 1:1–7	Hebrew	Herodian		
6QpapDan	Daniel	6Q7	Daniel 8:20–21; 10:8–16; 11:33–36,38; 8:16–17	Hebrew	Herodian	13 papyrus fragments.	
6QpapGiants or pap6QEnGiants	Book of Giants from Enoch	6Q8		Aramaic	Herodian	Part of the "Book of Giants"	
6Qpap apocrSam-Kgs or pap6QapocrSam/Kgs	Apocryphon on Samuel–Kings	6Q9		Hebrew	Hasmonean	Samuel–Kings apocryphon. Written on papyrus.	
6QpapaProph or pap6QProph	Unidentified prophetic fragment	6Q10		Hebrew	Hasmonean	Prophetic text. Written in papyrus	
6QAllegory	Allegory of the Vine	6Q11		Hebrew	Herodian	Fragment containing an Allegory mentioning a vine	
6QapProph	An apocryphal prophecy	6Q12		Hebrew	Herodian		
6QPriestProph	Priestly Prophecy	6Q13		Hebrew	Herodian	A priestly prophecy	
6Q Apocalypse	Apocalyptic text	6Q14		Aramaic	Herodian	Two fragments with apocalyptic text	
6QD	Damascus Document	6Q15		Hebrew	Herodian	Damascus Document 4:19–21; 5:13–14,18–21; 6:1–2,20–21; 7:1	
6QpapBened or pap6QBen	papBenediction	6Q16		Hebrew	Herodian	Blessings related 1QSb. On papyrus	
6QCalDoc	Calendrical Document	6Q17		Hebrew	Herodian	Calendric fragment	
pap6QHymn	Hymn	6Q18		Hebrew	Herodian	Fragment of a hymn, related to 1QM	
6Q Text Related to Genesis	Genesis	6Q19	Possibly from Genesis	Aramaic	Herodian	Related to Genesis 10:6,20	
6QDeut(?)	Deuteronomy	6Q20	Possibly from Deuteronomy	Hebrew	Hellenistic-Roman	Related to Deuteronomy 11:10	
6QfrgProph or 6Q Prophetic Text	Possibly prophetic text	6Q21		Hebrew	Herodian	Prophetic fragment containing 5 words.	
pap6QUnidA	Unclassified fragments	6Q22		Hebrew	Herodian		
pap6QUnidA ar	Unclassified fragments	6Q23		Aramaic	Herodian	Related to "Words of the Book of Michael"	
6QUnidB	Unclassified fragments	6Q24		Hebrew	Hellenistic-Roman		
6QUnidB	Unclassified fragments	6Q25		Aramaic	Herodian		
6QUnidB or 6QpapAccount or Contract	Accounts or contracts	6Q26		Aramaic	Hellenistic-Roman		
6QUnidB	Unclassified fragments	6Q27–6Q28		Hebrew	Hellenistic-Roman		
6QpapProv	Proverbs	6Q30	Proverbs 11:4b–7a,10b	Hebrew	Roman	Single six-line fragment	
6QUnidB	Unclassified fragments	6Q31		Aramaic	Herodian		

== See also ==
- Biblical manuscripts
- Septuagint manuscripts
- List of Hebrew Bible manuscripts

== Bibliography ==
- Fitzmyer, Joseph A. (2008). A Guide to the Dead Sea Scrolls and Related Literature. Grand Rapids, MI: William B. Eerdmans Publishing Company. ISBN 9780802862419.
