= 2 Kings 23 =

Chapter of the Hebrew and Christian Bible

- ← chapter 22 chapter 24 →
- The pages containing the Books of Kings (1 & 2 Kings) Leningrad Codex (1008 CE).
- Book: Second Book of Kings
- Hebrew Bible part: Nevi'im
- Order in the Hebrew part: 4
- Category: Former Prophets
- Christian Bible part: Old Testament
- Order in the Christian part: 12

2 Kings 23 is the twenty-third chapter of the second part of the Books of Kings in the Hebrew Bible or the Second Book of Kings in the Old Testament of the Christian Bible. The book is a compilation of various annals recording the acts of the kings of Israel and Judah by a Deuteronomic compiler in the seventh century BCE, with a supplement added in the sixth century BCE. This chapter records the events during the reign of Josiah, Jehoahaz and Jehoiakim, kings of Judah.

== Text ==
This chapter was originally written in the Hebrew language. It is divided into 37 verses.

=== Textual witnesses ===
Some early manuscripts containing the text of this chapter in Hebrew are of the Masoretic Text tradition, which includes the Codex Cairensis (895), Aleppo Codex (10th century), and Codex Leningradensis (1008).

There is also a translation into Koine Greek known as the Septuagint, made in the last few centuries BCE. Extant ancient manuscripts of the Septuagint version include Codex Vaticanus (B; $\mathfrak{G}$^{B}; 4th century) and Codex Alexandrinus (A; $\mathfrak{G}$^{A}; 5th century). (Note: The whole book of 2 Kings is missing from the extant Codex Sinaiticus.) The extant palimpsest Aq^{Burkitt} contains verses 11–27 in Koine Greek translated by Aquila of Sinope approximately in the early or mid-second century CE.

=== Old Testament references ===
- 2 Kings 23:1–3: 2 Chronicles 34:29–33
- 2 Kings 23:4–20: 1 Kings 13:1–10; 2 Chronicles 34:3–7
- 2 Kings 23:21–27: 2 Chronicles 35:1–19
- 2 Kings 23:28–30: 2 Chronicles 35:20–24
- 2 Kings 23:31–35: 2 Chronicles 36:1–4
- 2 Kings 23:36–37: 2 Chronicles 36:5–8

== Analysis ==
A parallel pattern of sequence is observed in the final sections of 2 Kings between 2 Kings 11-20 and 2 Kings 21–25, as follows:

A. Athaliah, daughter of Ahab, kills royal seed (2 Kings 11:1)

B. Joash reigns (2 Kings 11–12)

C. Quick sequence of kings of Israel and Judah (2 Kings 13–16)

D. Fall of Samaria (2 Kings 17)

E. Revival of Judah under Hezekiah (2 Kings 18–20)

A'. Manasseh, a king like Ahab, promotes idolatry and kills the innocence (2 Kings 21)

B'. Josiah reigns (2 Kings 22–23)

C'. Quick succession of kings of Judah (2 Kings 24)

D'. Fall of Jerusalem (2 Kings 25)

E'. Elevation of Jehoiachin (2 Kings 25:27–30)

2 Kings 22–23:30 mainly contains the story of Josiah's actions of his eighteenth year (22:3; 23:23) and the discovery of the book of the law (22:8-10; 23:24) as grouped based on five royal initiatives (using distinct verbs "send" and "command"):

1. Discovery of the book (22:3-11; "sent," 22:3)
2. Inquiry about the book (22:12-20; "commanded," 22:12)
3. Covenant and the book (23:1-3; "sent," 23:1)
4. Reforms from the book (23:4-20; "commanded," 23:4)
5. Passover from the book (23:21-24; "commanded," 23:21)

2 Kings 23–24 contain a 'neat scheme' within the chaos at the end of the kingdom of Judah:

| 2 Kings 23:31-24:2 | 2 Kings 24:8-25:1 |
|---|---|
| Jehoahaz reigned for three months | Jehoiachin reigned for three months |
| Jehoahaz was imprisoned by Pharaoh Necho | Jehoiachin was imprisoned by Nebuchadnezzar |
| Necho placed Eliakim on throne and changed his name to Jehoiakim | Nebuchadnezzar placed Mattaniah on throne and changed his name to Zedekiah |
| Necho took Jehoahaz to Egypt; Jehoahaz died in Egypt | Nebuchadnezzar took Jehoiachin to Babylon; Jehoiachin was eventually elevated in Babylon |

Most of 2 Kings 23 particularly focuses on Josiah's response to the Book of Law, being grammatically the subject of all the verbs used throughout verses 1–30. 2 Kings 23:4-20 records twelve actions by Josiah, which in numerological view is signified by his 'twelvefold purging' of idolatry, reformation of all twelve tribes of Israel and the renewal of the kingdom from Bethel to Beersheba. He is the eighth king commended for "doing right" in the eyes of God, who began his reign in his eighth year of age (2 Kings 22:1) and the only king who actually heard and read the book of Torah. However, Josiah could not prevent the destruction of Judah, as the promise and threat of Torah would be seen as fulfilled in the whole book of Kings. By the end of 2 Kings, everything established during the golden age of Solomon, promised to David, became unraveled: Under Solomon, Egypt entered a marriage alliance with Judah, but after Josiah, Egypt conquered Judah (23:31-37), and whereas Solomon received tribute, his descendants paid it to other nations.

== Josiah's implementation of religious reforms (23:1–24) ==
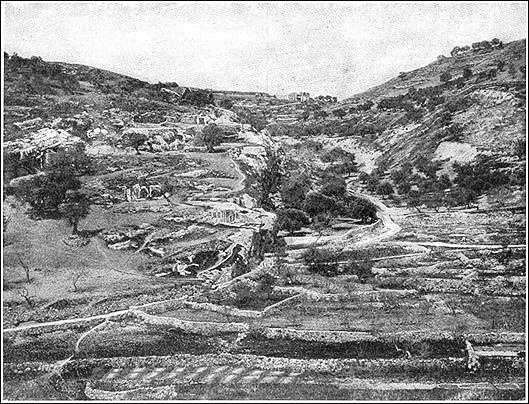
Valley of Hinnom, c. 1900.

This section records the religious reform by Josiah that he had performed together with all the people in a covenant (verse 4). The actions cover three areas:

1. The temple of Jerusalem was cleansed of idols and given the 'designated central role' (verses 4–7, 11–12).
2. The cult sites in the Judean provinces were desecrated (verses 8–10, 13–14) and those in the former northern kingdom were eradicated, especially the "altar of Bethel" established by Jeroboam (verses 12–20). The destruction of the altar in Bethel (verses 15–18) had clear references to 1 Kings 13
3. The communal passover feast was celebrated according to the covenant (verses 21–23, cf. Deuteronomy 16:5–6).

=== Verse 10 ===
And he defiled Topheth, which is in the Valley of the Son of Hinnom, that no man might make his son or his daughter pass through the fire to Molech.

- "Topheth": Rabbi David Kimhi's commentary on Psalm 27:13 links the "burning rubbish heap in the Valley of Hinnom south of Jerusalem" to the idea of a "fiery Gehenna of judgment" as 'this loathsome valley fires were kept burning perpetually to consume the filth and cadavers thrown into it'.

=== Verse 11 ===
And he removed the horses that the kings of Judah had dedicated to the sun, at the entrance to the house of the LORD, by the chamber of Nathan-melech the chamberlain, which was in the precincts. And he burned the chariots of the sun with fire.

- "Nathan-melech the chamberlain": An inscription "(belonging) to Nathan-melech, servant of the king" was found on a clay seal (bulla) impression measuring just over 1 centimetre (0.39 in) in diameter, discovered during the excavation in the City of David area of Jerusalem through a destruction layer of a public building constructed in the eighth century BCE and destroyed during the Babylonian siege of Jerusalem in 587 BCE. The wording on the seal was deciphered by Anat Mendel-Geberovich of the Hebrew University of Jerusalem and the Center for the Study of Ancient Jerusalem. Yiftah Shalev, co-director of that Jerusalem excavation noticed that the rarity of name, together with a title equals to "the chamberlain" (NKJV: "the officer who was in the court") mentioned in 2 Kings 23:11, epigraphically (based on the shape of the letters) dated to the second half of the seventh century/early sixth century, and linked to a structure also dated to the same period, which is exactly the time the biblical Nathan-Melech was active in Jerusalem, make it very likely to belong to the same person.

== Josiah's death (23:25–30) ==
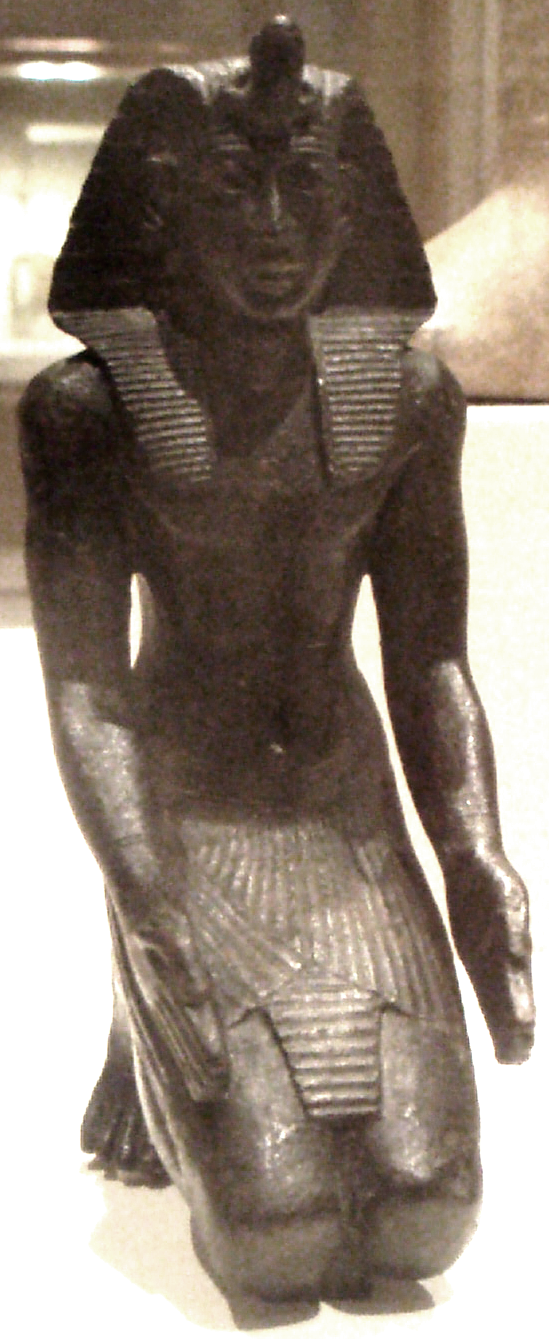
A kneeling bronze statuette, likely Necho II, now in the Brooklyn Museum.

In death, there is a parallel between Josiah and Ahab as both were killed during battles with foreign powers, and both were brought from the battlefield to the capital city to be buried (1 Kings 22:34-37; 2 Kings 23:28-30). Both of them learned about the prophecy of doom on their dynasties that would happen not during their lifetimes, but during the reign of their sons (1 Kings 21:20-29; 2 Kings 22:15-20), with two sons of Ahab (Ahaziah in 2 Kings 1 and Jehoram in 2 Kings 3:1; 9:14-16) to reign over Israel, before the whole dynasty was eliminated by Jehu (2 Kings 9–10), and two generations (three sons—Jehoahaz, Jehoiakim, Zedekiah—and one grandson, Jehoiachin) succeeding Josiah to reign over Judah before the kingdom was destroyed by Nebuchadnezzar. The huge difference is that Josiah receives the highest praise from the editors of the book of Kings for his religious reforms (verse 25), which was also confirmed by Jeremiah, who describes him as a popular king who was 'modest and socially just' (Jeremiah 22:15–16).

=== Verse 25 ===
And like unto him was there no king before him, that turned to the Lord with all his heart, and with all his soul, and with all his might, according to all the law of Moses; neither after him arose there any like him.

- "And like unto him was there no king": similar words are said of Hezekiah in 2 Kings 18:5, but the pre-eminence is not the same for the two kings: for Hezekiah is the "trust in God"; for Josiah is the "exact obedience to the Law".
- "Neither after him arose there any like him": this is a moderate praise, because the four kings of Judah after Josiah —Jehoahaz, Jehoiakim, Jehoiachin, and Zedekiah— were all considered wicked.

== Jehoahaz ben Josiah king of Judah (23:31–35) ==
The regnal account of Jehoahaz consists of an introductory regnal part (verses 31–32) and his replacement with Jehoaikim by Pharaoh Necho (verses 33–35) without the typical concluding part. The waw-consecutive syntactical sequence employed in the account of Necho's action (verses 33–34a) shifts to a 'conjunctive waw sequence in verses 34b–35 for the statements of Jehoahaz's death in Egypt and Jehoiakim's taxation to pay tribute to Necho.

After defeating Josiah at Megiddo in 609 BCE, Necho had no time to interfere Judah's affair because he had to quickly go to help his Assyrian allies in the last stand against Babylonia in Harran. The battle with Josiah hindered Necho to arrive in time, so he could only attempt in vain for several months to bring back Assuruballit (his Assyrian ally) on the throne. Meanwhile, the anti-Egyptian people in Judah crowned Jehoahaz, a younger son of Josiah, only to be dethroned three months later by Necho, who also penalized the inhabitants with heavy taxation. Necho placed as his puppet king Jehoahaz's older brother, Eliakim (Jehoiakim), who was earlier rejected by the people of Judah and whose mother's family was from the northern part of Israel (verse 36), so it could provide a base of support against the threat of Babylonia.

=== Verse 30 ===
And his servants carried him dead in a chariot from Megiddo and brought him to Jerusalem and buried him in his own tomb.
And the people of the land took Jehoahaz the son of Josiah, and anointed him, and made him king in his father's place.

- "From Megiddo": similar fate to Josiah's ancestor, Ahaziah (2 Kings 9:27–28). 2 Chronicles 35:20–24 provide more detailed account of Josiah's death.

=== Verse 31 ===
Jehoahaz was twenty and three years old when he began to reign; and he reigned three months in Jerusalem. And his mother's name was Hamutal, the daughter of Jeremiah of Libnah.

- Cross reference: 2 Chronicles 36:2
- Jehoahaz: could be a throne name since Jeremiah 22:11 and 1 Chronicles 3:15 wrote his name as "Shallum". Both William F. Albright and E. R. Thiele dated his reign to 609 BCE, making his birth in 633/632 BCE. The Babylonian Chronicle dates the battle in Harran with Assyrians and Egypt from Tammuz (July–August) to Elul (August–September) of 609 BCE, which would place the death of Josiah and the start of Jehoahaz reign in month of Tammuz 609 BCE or the month prior, when Egyptian army was still on the way to Harran.
- Libnah: in Shephelah. Taking Hamutal as his wife may indicate Josiah's effort to strengthen this southwestern border area of Judah to resist Egypt.

=== Verse 33 ===
Now Pharaoh Necho put him in prison at Riblah in the land of Hamath, that he might not reign in Jerusalem; and he imposed on the land a tribute of one hundred talents of silver and a talent of gold.

- "Riblah": in the Beqaa Valley, Lebanon, about 7 miles (11 km) south of Kadesh on the Orontes River, is a strategically important location to resist Babylonian's threat from the north and to exert power to the south. Nebuchadnezzar II also made Riblah his headquarter during the siege of Jerusalem in 587 BCE (Jeremiah 39:5).
- "Talent": a weight measure of about 34 kilograms (75 lb).

=== Verse 34 ===
And Pharaoh Neco made Eliakim the son of Josiah king in the place of Josiah his father, and changed his name to Jehoiakim. But he took Jehoahaz away, and he came to Egypt and died there.

- Cross reference: 2 Chronicles 36:4
- "Changed his name": Pharaoh Neco (also spelled "Necho" or "Nechoh" in different Bible versions) demanded the change of name as a mark of subjection (cf. Genesis 41:45; Ezra 5:14; Daniel 1:7; also 2 Kings 24:17), but apparently left the choice of the name to the person, so the change could be as small as possible, in this case to substitute the initial element "El" (God) in "El-iakim" with "Jeho" (Hebrew: "Yahu" for YHWH) in "Jeho-iakim".

== Jehoiakim ben Josiah king of Judah (23:36–37) ==
This part contains the introductory regnal formula on the account of Jehoiakim's reign as king of Judah. The regnal account continues to the main part in 2 Kings 24:1–4 and the concluding regnal formula in 2 Kings 24:5–7.

=== Verse 36 ===
Jehoiakim was twenty and five years old when he began to reign; and he reigned eleven years in Jerusalem. And his mother's name was Zebudah, the daughter of Pedaiah of Rumah.

- "Jehoiakim": the throne name of Eliakim, the son of Josiah, the older brother of Jehoahaz.
- "Rumah" is believed to be in Galilee region in the northern part of Israel, where the family of Zebudah (as should be read (qere); literally written (ketiv) as זְבִידָה 'Zebidah') might help Josiah securing control on the area and Necho would take advantage of this to provide support against Babylonian threat from the north.

== Illustration ==
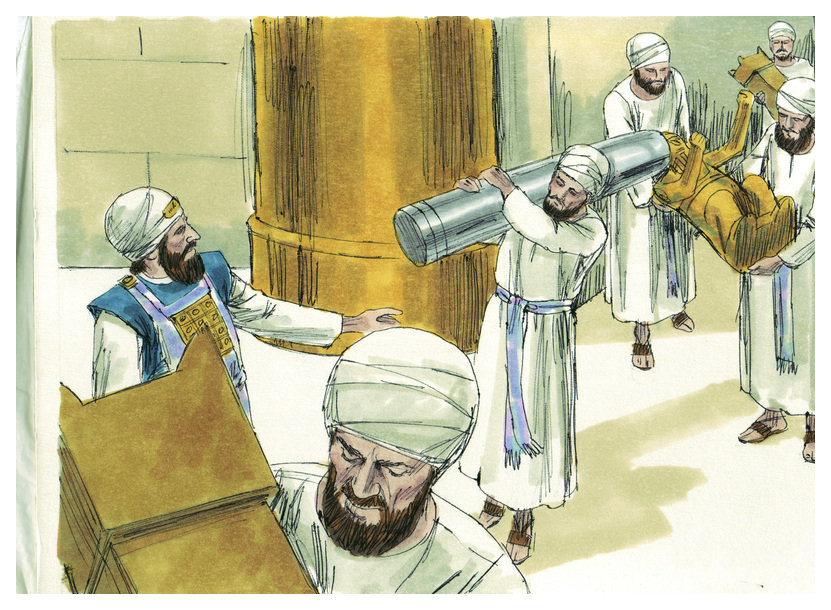
Josiah commanded the priests to remove idols from the temple of the Lord

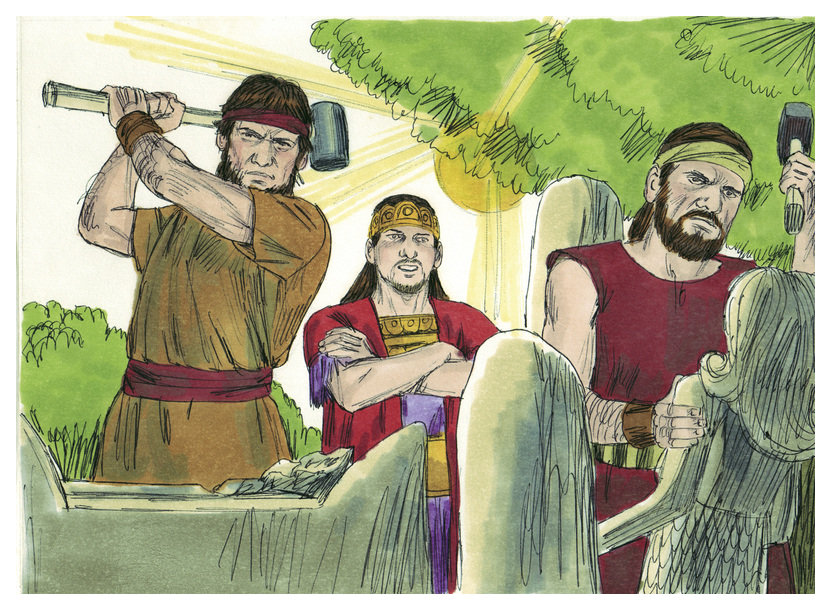
People broke in pieces the altars of idols

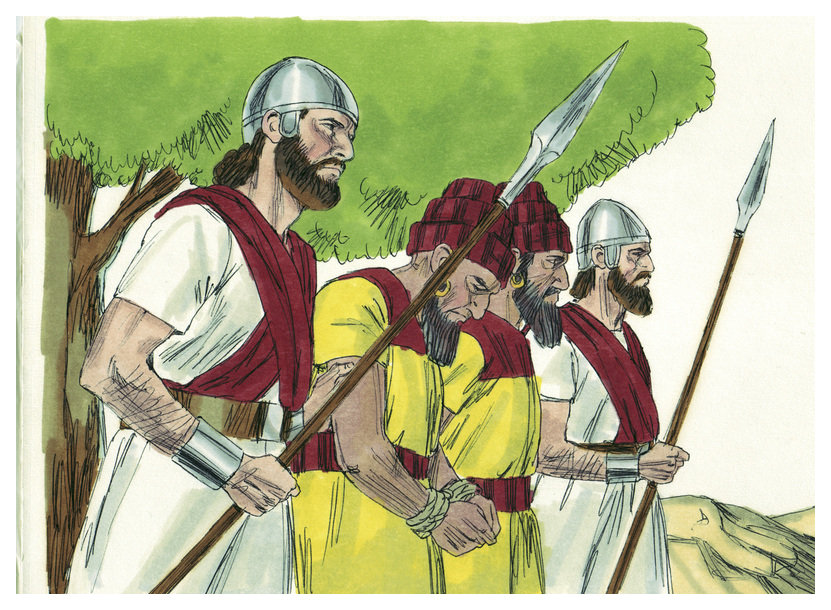
All workers with familiar spirits, and the wizards were cast away from the land of Judah

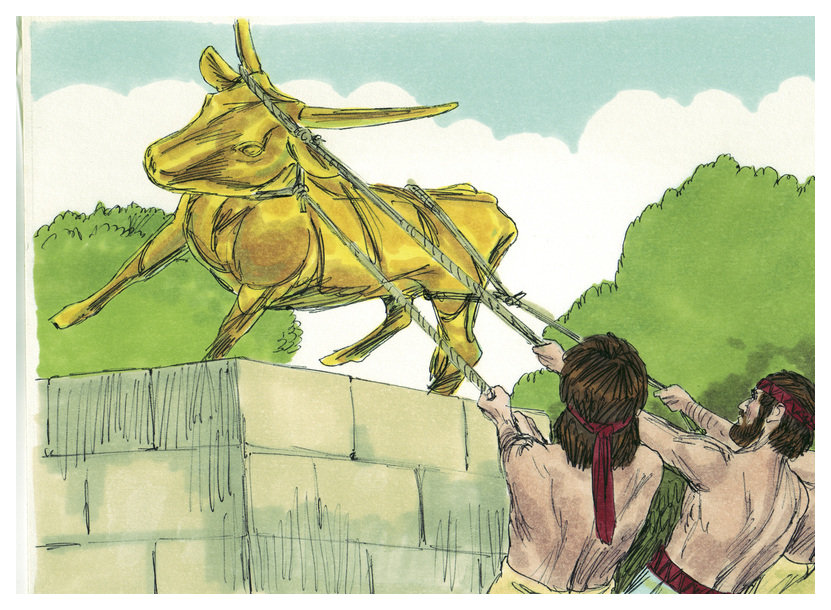
The altar and high place in Bethel were torn down

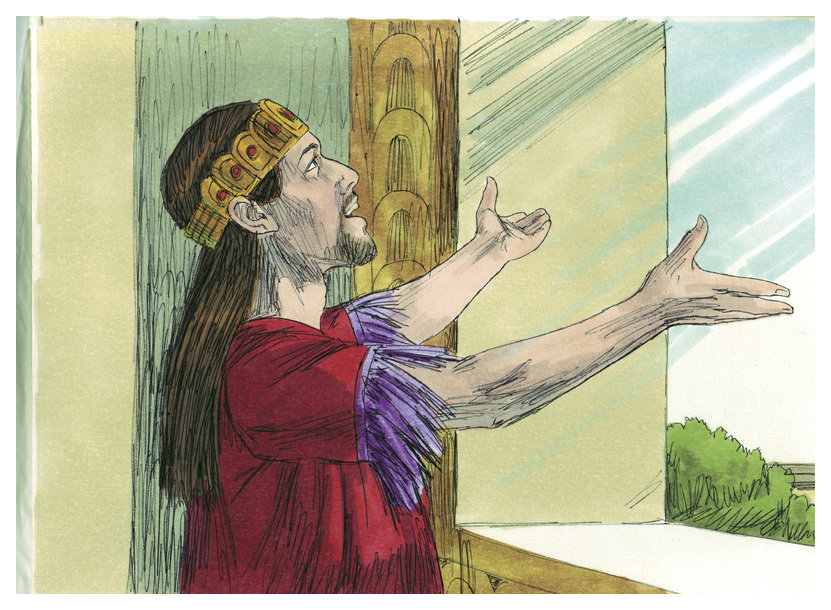
Josiah turned to the Lord with all his heart, and with all his soul, and with all his might, according to all the law of Moses

== See also ==
- Armageddon
- Megiddo
- Moloch
- Necho II
- Solomon
- Tophet
- Zedekiah
- Related Bible parts: 1 Kings 11, 2 Kings 24, 2 Chronicles 34, 2 Chronicles 35, 2 Chronicles 36, Isaiah 30, Jeremiah 7, Jeremiah 19, Jeremiah 22, Ezekiel 19

== Sources ==
- Cogan, Mordechai; Tadmor, Hayim (1988). II Kings: A New Translation. Anchor Yale Bible Commentaries. Vol. 11. Doubleday. ISBN 9780385023887.
- Collins, John J. (2014). "Chapter 14: 1 Kings 12 – 2 Kings 25". Introduction to the Hebrew Scriptures. Fortress Press. pp. 277–296. ISBN 9781451469233.
- Coogan, Michael David (2007). Coogan, Michael David; Brettler, Marc Zvi; Newsom, Carol Ann; Perkins, Pheme (eds.). The New Oxford Annotated Bible with the Apocryphal/Deuterocanonical Books: New Revised Standard Version, Issue 48 (Augmented 3rd ed.). Oxford University Press. ISBN 9780195288810.
- Dietrich, Walter (2007). "13. 1 and 2 Kings". In Barton, John; Muddiman, John (eds.). The Oxford Bible Commentary (first (paperback) ed.). Oxford University Press. pp. 232–266. ISBN 978-0199277186.
- Fretheim, Terence E (1997). First and Second Kings. Westminster John Knox Press. ISBN 978-0-664-25565-7.
- Halley, Henry H. (1965). Halley's Bible Handbook: an abbreviated Bible commentary (24th (revised) ed.). Zondervan Publishing House. ISBN 0-310-25720-4.
- Leithart, Peter J. (2006). 1 & 2 Kings. Brazos Theological Commentary on the Bible. Brazos Press. ISBN 978-1587431258.
- McFall, Leslie (1991), "Translation Guide to the Chronological Data in Kings and Chronicles" (PDF), Bibliotheca Sacra, 148: 3–45, archived from the original (PDF) on August 27, 2010
- McKane, William (1993). "Kings, Book of". In Metzger, Bruce M; Coogan, Michael D (eds.). The Oxford Companion to the Bible. Oxford University Press. pp. 409–413. ISBN 978-0195046458.
- Nelson, Richard Donald (1987). First and Second Kings. Westminster John Knox Press. ISBN 978-0-664-22084-6.
- Pritchard, James B (1969). Ancient Near Eastern texts relating to the Old Testament (3 ed.). Princeton University Press. ISBN 9780691035031.
- Sweeney, Marvin (2007). I & II Kings: A Commentary. Westminster John Knox Press. ISBN 978-0-664-22084-6.
- Thiele, Edwin R. (1983). The Mysterious Numbers of the Hebrew Kings (3rd ed.). Grand Rapids, Michigan: Zondervan. ISBN 978-0-310-36010-0.
- Würthwein, Ernst (1995). The Text of the Old Testament. Translated by Rhodes, Erroll F. Grand Rapids, MI: Wm. B. Eerdmans. ISBN 0-8028-0788-7.
