= 2 Chronicles 35 =

Second Book of Chronicles, chapter 35

- ← chapter 34 chapter 36 →
- The complete Hebrew text of the Books of Chronicles (1st and 2nd Chronicles) in the Leningrad Codex (1008 CE).
- Book: Books of Chronicles
- Category: Ketuvim
- Christian Bible part: Old Testament
- Order in the Christian part: 14

2 Chronicles 35 is the thirty-fifth chapter of the Second Book of Chronicles in the Old Testament of the Christian Bible or of the second part of the Books of Chronicles in the Hebrew Bible. The book was compiled from older sources by an unknown person or group, designated by modern scholars as "the Chronicler", and had the final shape established in late fifth or fourth century BCE. This chapter belongs to the section focusing on the kingdom of Judah until its destruction by the Babylonians under Nebuchadnezzar and the beginning of restoration under Cyrus the Great of Persia (2 Chronicles 10 to 36). It contains a regnal account of Josiah the king of Judah.

== Text ==
This chapter was originally written in the Hebrew language and is divided into 27 verses.

=== Textual witnesses ===
Some early manuscripts containing the text of this chapter in Hebrew are of the Masoretic Text tradition, which includes the Aleppo Codex (10th century (Note: Since 1947 the current text of Aleppo Codex is missing 2 Chronicles 26:19–35:7.)), and Codex Leningradensis (1008).

There is also a translation into Koine Greek known as the Septuagint, made in the last few centuries BCE. Extant ancient manuscripts of the Septuagint version include Codex Vaticanus (B; $\mathfrak{G}$^{B}; 4th century), and Codex Alexandrinus (A; $\mathfrak{G}$^{A}; 5th century). (Note: The whole book of 2 Chronicles is missing from the extant Codex Sinaiticus.) This chapter is also largely reproduced in chapter 1 of the Septuagint's 1 Esdras.

=== Old Testament references ===
- 2 Chronicles 35:1–19: 2 Kings 23:21–27
- 2 Chronicles 35:20–24: 2 Kings 23:28–30.

== Analysis ==
This chapter can be divided into three sections:

1. the Passover feast, which was celebrated after Josiah's reforms (verses 1–19)
2. Josiah's death (verses 20–24)
3. the concluding remark on his reign (verses 25–27).

== Josiah restores the Passover (35:1–19) ==
Unlike the hasty celebration in Hezekiah's time, the liturgy of the Passover feast in Josiah's 18th year of reign is performed meticulously on the appointed day in Jerusalem (verse 1), referring to Exodus 12 and Deuteronomy 16, including the involvement of the Levites and musicians in the procedures.

=== Verse 1 ===
Now Josiah kept a Passover to the LORD in Jerusalem, and they slaughtered the Passover lambs on the fourteenth day of the first month.

- "The fourteenth day of the first month": in accordance to Exodus 12:6). In the time of Hezekiah, under special circumstances, it was celebrated on the 14th day of the second month (2 Chronicles 30:2). 2 Kings 23:23 reported that the event was in "the eighteenth year of king Josiah."

=== Verse 3 ===
Then he said to the Levites who taught all Israel, who were holy to the LORD: “Put the holy ark in the house which Solomon the son of David, king of Israel, built. It shall no longer be a burden on your shoulders. Now serve the LORD your God and His people Israel.

- "Put the holy ark in the house": this could indicate that the ark may have been removed from the temple during Manasseh's reign.

=== Verse 13 ===
Also they roasted the Passover offerings with fire according to the ordinance; but the other holy offerings they boiled in pots, in caldrons, and in pans, and divided them quickly among all the lay people.

The instructions for the original Passover meal in the Book of Exodus forbade boiling any animal parts, but Deuteronomy has text which some versions translate as "boil". The writer of 2 Chronicles uses a phrase "boiled in the fire", or "in pots, in caldrons, and in pans", to accommodate these apparently contradictory directives.

== Josiah's death (35:20–27) ==
The report in this section has been regarded by some commentaries as historically more reliable and with clearer explanation about the event than that in the Books of Kings. The description of Josiah's armor, his wounding, and his order to be taken to Jerusalem is quite similar to that of Ahab (1 Kings 22:30, 34). Although the passage and the Talmud attribute the lamentations to Jeremiah, Mathys suggests that Zechariah 12:9–14 may be the one referred in verses 24b–25, as it seems to refer to Josiah's death.

=== Verse 20 ===
After all this, when Josiah had prepared the temple, Necho king of Egypt came up to fight against Carchemish by the Euphrates; and Josiah went out against him.

The reference to Carchemish on the Euphrates (verse 20) uses similar wording as in Jeremiah 46:2. The Battle of Carchemish was eventually fought in 605 BCE where the Babylonian and Median army led by Nebuchadnezzar II destroyed the combined Egyptian and Assyrian forces, ending the existence of the Assyrian empire and eliminating Egypt's significant role in the Ancient Near East since that time.

== See also ==
- Battle of Carchemish
- Battle of Megiddo (609 BC)}}
- Related Bible parts: Exodus 12, Deuteronomy 16, 2 Kings 23, 2 Kings 24

== Sources ==
- Ackroyd, Peter R (1993). "Chronicles, Books of". In Metzger, Bruce M; Coogan, Michael D (eds.). The Oxford Companion to the Bible. Oxford University Press. pp. 113–116. ISBN 978-0195046458.
- Bennett, William (2018). The Expositor's Bible: The Books of Chronicles. Litres. ISBN 978-5040825196.
- Coogan, Michael David (2007). Coogan, Michael David; Brettler, Marc Zvi; Newsom, Carol Ann; Perkins, Pheme (eds.). The New Oxford Annotated Bible with the Apocryphal/Deuterocanonical Books: New Revised Standard Version, Issue 48 (Augmented 3rd ed.). Oxford University Press. ISBN 9780195288810.
- Dietrich, Walter (2007). "13. 1 and 2 Kings". In Barton, John; Muddiman, John (eds.). The Oxford Bible Commentary (first (paperback) ed.). Oxford University Press. pp. 232–615. ISBN 978-0199277186.
- Mathys, H. P. (2007). "14. 1 and 2 Chronicles". In Barton, John; Muddiman, John (eds.). The Oxford Bible Commentary (first (paperback) ed.). Oxford University Press. pp. 267–308. ISBN 978-0199277186.
- Japhet, Sara (2007). "49. 1 Esdras". In Barton, John; Muddiman, John (eds.). The Oxford Bible Commentary (first (paperback) ed.). Oxford University Press. pp. 751–770. ISBN 978-0199277186.
- Nelson, Thomas (2014). NIV, Chronological Study Bible, EBook: Holy Bible, New International Version. Brazil: Thomas Nelson. ISBN 978-1-4016-8013-8.
- Sweeney, Marvin (2007). I & II Kings: A Commentary. Westminster John Knox Press. ISBN 978-0-664-22084-6.
- Ulrich, Eugene, ed. (2010). The Biblical Qumran Scrolls: Transcriptions and Textual Variants. Brill.
- Würthwein, Ernst (1995). The Text of the Old Testament. Translated by Rhodes, Erroll F. Grand Rapids, MI: Wm. B. Eerdmans. ISBN 0-8028-0788-7.
