= 2 Kings 10 =

2 Kings, chapter 10

- ← chapter 9 chapter 11 →
- The pages containing the Books of Kings (1 & 2 Kings) Leningrad Codex (1008 CE).
- Book: Second Book of Kings
- Hebrew Bible part: Nevi'im
- Order in the Hebrew part: 4
- Category: Former Prophets
- Christian Bible part: Old Testament
- Order in the Christian part: 12

2 Kings 10 is the tenth chapter of the second part of the Books of Kings in the Hebrew Bible or the Second Book of Kings in the Old Testament of the Christian Bible. The book is a compilation of various annals recording the acts of the kings of Israel and Judah by a Deuteronomic compiler in the seventh century BCE, with a supplement added in the sixth century BCE. This chapter records Jehu's massacres of the sons of Ahab, the kinsmen of Ahaziah the king of Judah and the Baal worshippers linked to Jezebel. The narrative is a part of a major section 2 Kings 9:1–15:12 covering the period of Jehu's dynasty.

== Text ==
This chapter was originally written in the Hebrew language and since the 16th century is divided into 36 verses.

=== Textual witnesses ===
Some early manuscripts containing the text of this chapter in Hebrew are of the Masoretic Text tradition, which includes the Codex Cairensis (895), Aleppo Codex (10th century), and Codex Leningradensis (1008). Fragments containing parts of this chapter in Hebrew were found among the Dead Sea Scrolls, that is, 6Q4 (6QpapKgs; 150–75 BCE) with extant verses 19–21.

There is also a translation into Koine Greek known as the Septuagint, made in the last few centuries BCE. Extant ancient manuscripts of the Septuagint version include Codex Vaticanus (B; $\mathfrak{G}$^{B}; 4th century) and Codex Alexandrinus (A; $\mathfrak{G}$^{A}; 5th century). (Note: The whole book of 2 Kings is missing from the extant Codex Sinaiticus.)

== Analysis ==
This chapter and the previous one contain the narrative of Jehu's overthrow of the Omride dynasty and destruction of the Baal worship in Israel, reopening the battle against apostasy which was started by Elijah (1 Kings 18). Following his anointing, Jehu executed a total revolution in Israel and Judah, by killing the reigning kings (and their family members) of both kingdoms. The narrative may be divided into two parallel sections, the first one about the assassination of the leaders (including Jezebel, the queen mother of Israel) and the second about the killing of their kinsmen (including the Baal worshippers as Jezebel's "kin"), ending with a summary of Jehu's reign and the consequences of his action in relation to his faithfulness to YHWH. The structure can be as follows: (Note: This structure is from Francisco O. Garcia-Treto, "The Fall of the House: A Carnivalesque Reading of 2 Kings 9 and 10," Journal for the Study of the Old Testament 46 (1990) 54; apud Cohn 2000, p. 65.)

A Jehu is anointed king (9:1–15)

B Jehu kills King Jehoram outside Jezreel (9:16–26)
C Jehu kills King Ahaziah in Beth-haggan (9:27–29)
D Jehu has Jezebel killed in Jezreel (9:30–37)

B' Jehu massacres the house of Ahab in Jezreel (10:1–11)
C' Jehu massacres the kinsmen of King Ahaziah at Beth-eked (10:12–14)
D' Jehu massacres worshipers of Baal and destroys house of Baal in Samaria (10:15–28)

A' Summary of reign of Jehu (10:29–36)

== Jehu massacres the house of Ahab (10:1–11) ==
The eradication of the entire ruling house after a coup was common in the ancient Near East, because it minimized the threat of blood-revenge and claims to the throne. As the royal house of Omri is in Samaria (1 Kings 16:24), Jehu wrote to the Samarians to 'choose between loyalty to the previous dynasty and defection to him, the murderer of their king' (verses 1–5). The Samarians, like the Jezreelites, chose to follow Jehu and they brought the heads of the decapitated 70 Omrides to Jezreel (verses 6–7). Jehu took responsibility for murdering the king, but not for the slaughter of the royal family. It seems that Jehu was God's instrument to fulfill the prophecy spoken through the prophet Elijah (verse 10), but the way he executed the coup was blameworthy, because about 100 years later the prophet Hosea states that God 'will punish the house of Jehu for the blood of Jezreel' (Hosea 1:4).

=== Verses 1 ===
Now Ahab had seventy sons in Samaria. And Jehu wrote and sent letters to Samaria, to the rulers of Jezreel, to the elders, and to those who reared Ahab’s sons, saying:

- "Jezreel": as in the Masoretic Text, Syriac versions and Targum. The Greek Septuagint has "Samaria", whereas the Latin Vulgate has "city".

The correspondence regarding the fate of the Ahab's sons recalls Ahab and Jezebel's correspondence with the nobles of Jezreel regarding Naboth's fate (1 Kings 21:8–10).

=== Verse 10 ===
"Know now that nothing shall fall to the earth of the word of the Lord which the Lord spoke concerning the house of Ahab; for the Lord has done what He spoke by His servant Elijah."

- "By his servant Elijah": lit. in Hebrew "by the hand of his servant Elijah."

== Jehu massacres the kinsmen of King Ahaziah (10:12–14) ==
Forty-two male members of the Judean royal family, who were closely tied and related to the Israelite royal house (cf. 2 Kings 3:7; 8:26, 29) near Betheked (presumably between Jezreel and Samaria) and ignorantly announced 'their allegiance to the Omrides, and thereby condemned themselves to death' (verses 13–14).

== Jehu massacres worshipers of Baal and destroys house of Baal (10:15–28) ==
In their common 'zeal for the LORD', Jehu formed an alliance with Jehonadab ben Rechab, presumably the leader of a nomadic YHWH-worshipping religious clan which had strictly detached itself from the culture and religion of the country (cf. Jeremiah 35). The news that many Omrides have been killed (verse 17) is related to the full execution of the announcement made in 2 Kings 9:8–9. Jehu (and Jehonadab) then targets the house of Baal in Samaria, established since the time of Ahab (1 Kings 16:32). As the Baal worshippers were closely linked to Ahab's royal family, the attack on them is clearly in line with Jehu's revolution. Jehu gathers all the prophets and priests in the temple using lures and threats (verses 18–19). Jehu's announcement, 'I have a great sacrifice to offer to Baal' (verse 19) is 'cruelly ambiguous, as he initially performs the sacrificial rites as a devout king would do (verse 24), only to order the ensuing human sacrifice'. According to verse 21, all servants of Baal throughout Israel should be eradicated, but individual YHWH-worshippers must first be separated from the mass (verse 22b), recalling the same problem in Genesis 18:17–33. Jehu's soldiers executed the order thoroughly, destroying the cella ('the citadel of the temple') and the matzbas within it, then transforming the holy site into a latrine, to remain so 'unto this day' (verses 25, 27). Jehu's victory led to a decisive turn in the political and religious history of Israel.

=== Verse 27 ===
And they demolished the pillar of Baal, and demolished the house of Baal, and made it a latrine to this day.

- "Latrine": from the written Hebrew word (kethib) מַחֲרָאוֹת (makharaʾot), meaning "places to defecate" or "dung houses" (with the related noun חֶרֶא (khereʾ)/חֲרִי (khari), "dung"), which is only used here in the Hebrew Bible. The marginal note has the reading (Qere) מוֹצָאוֹת (motsaʾot), “outhouses”, perhaps a euphemistic gloss.

== The reign of Jehu (10:29–36) ==
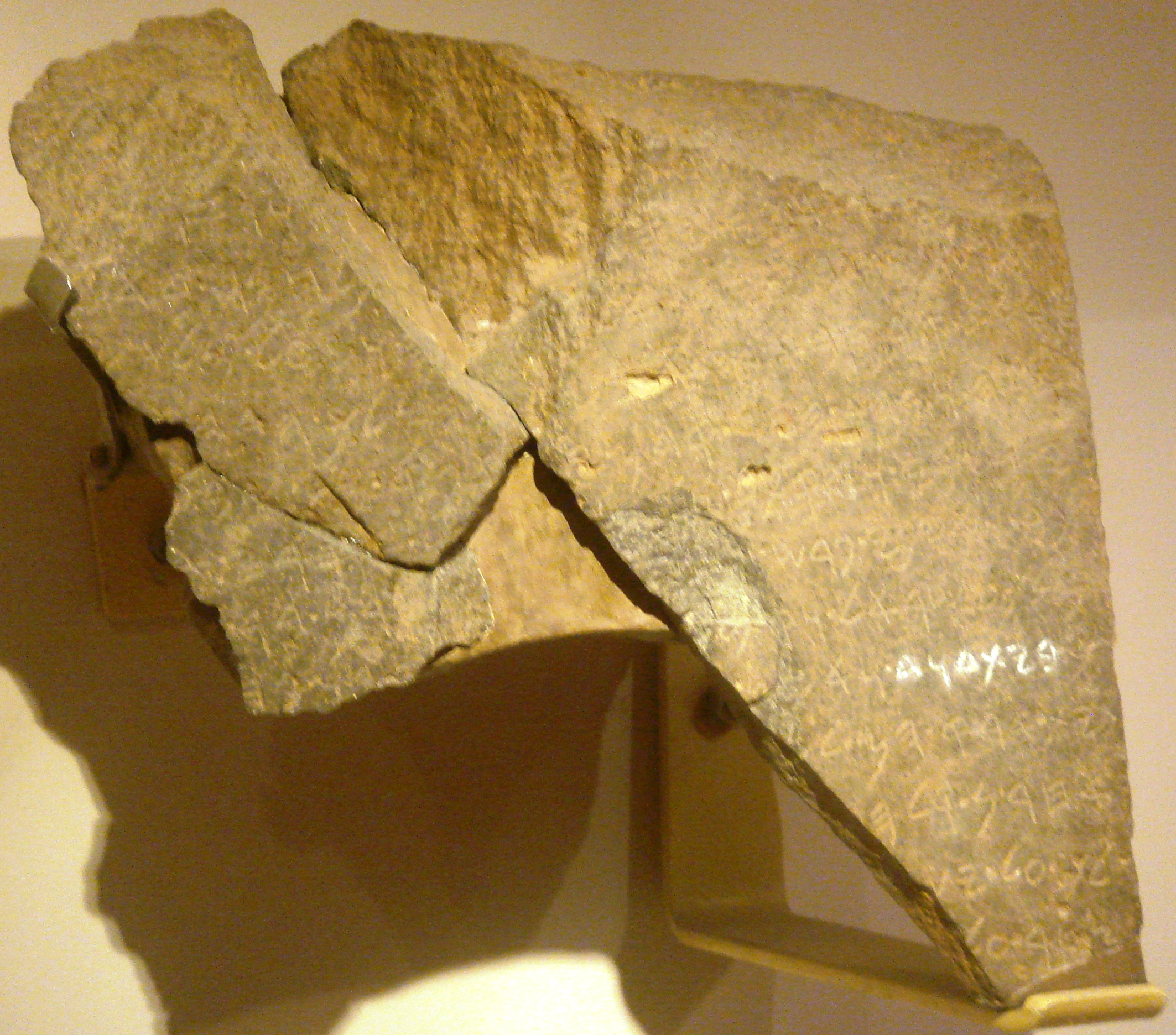
Tel Dan Stele (9th century BCE) at the Israel Museum. Jehu is alluded in it. Highlighted in white is the Aramaic text for "House of David".

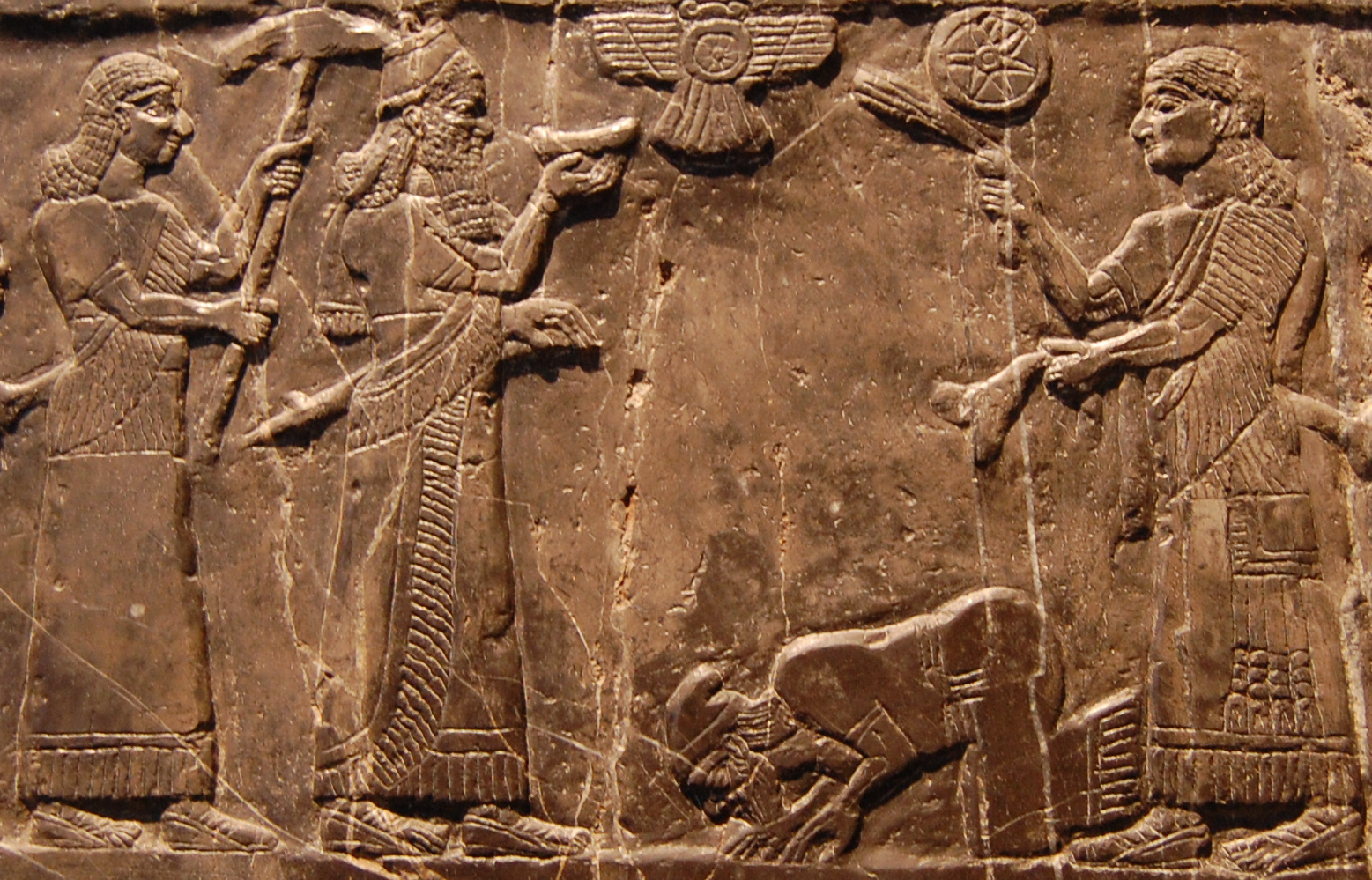
In a scene from the Black Obelisk Jehu bows before Shalmaneser III.

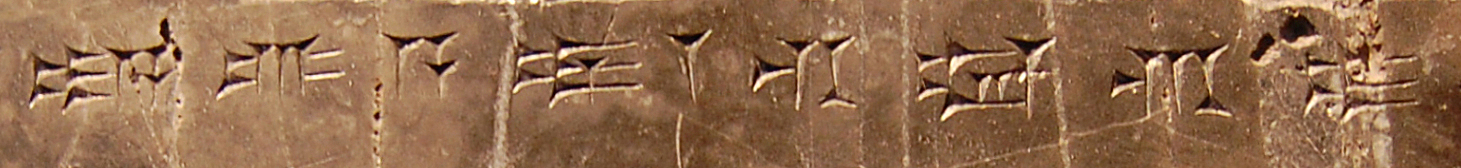
The inscription ^{m}Ia-ú-a mar ^{m}Hu-um-ri-i (Akkadian: 𒅀𒌑𒀀 𒈥 𒄷𒌝𒊑𒄿): "Jehu of the land of people of Omri)".

The final passage of this chapter contains annal notes of Jehu's reign. Jehu eradicated Baal worship in Israel, but the idol worship sites still stood in Bethel and Dan, so he received bad rating, although his dynasty lasted four generations: no more than the Omrides, but longer in years (36 years for house of Omri to 100 years for house of Jehu, of which Jehu himself ruled for 28 years. However, verse 32 immediately shows that it was not a particularly good time for Israel, as the Arameans quickly put Israel under pressure. On the Tel Dan Stele erected presumably by Hazael the king of Aram (Syria) in the same period, it was written that the Arameans had comprehensive victories over Israel and Judah, explicitly stating the killing of "Joram the son of Ahab king of Israel and Ahaziah son of Jehoram of the king of the house of David" with a probable reading of Jehu appointed to rule Israel (line 11–12). This could mean that Jehu (willingly or unwillingly) was Hazael's accomplice. Soon the Assyrians came to defeat the Arameans, so Jehu might have to pay tribute to Shalmaneser III the Assyrian king, as depicted in the Black Obelisk (written in about 825 BCE, found in Nimrud, now in the British Museum).

=== Verse 36 ===
And the time that Jehu reigned over Israel in Samaria was twenty and eight years.

- "Twenty and eight years": According to Thiele's chronology, following "non-accession year method", Jehu was the king of Israel starting between April and September 841 BCE until his death between September 814 BCE and April 813 BCE, which is from 90th year to 118th year after the separation of the kingdoms of Israel (Samaria) and Judah.

== See also ==
- Jezreel
- Samaria
- Related Bible parts:2 Kings 9, Hosea 1

== Sources ==
- Cohn, Robert L. (2000). Cotter, David W.; Walsh, Jerome T.; Franke, Chris (eds.). 2 Kings. Berit Olam (The Everlasting Covenant): Studies In Hebrew Narrative And Poetry. Liturgical Press. ISBN 9780814650547.
- Collins, John J. (2014). "Chapter 14: 1 Kings 12 – 2 Kings 25". Introduction to the Hebrew Scriptures. Fortress Press. pp. 277–296. ISBN 9781451469233.
- Coogan, Michael David (2007). Coogan, Michael David; Brettler, Marc Zvi; Newsom, Carol Ann; Perkins, Pheme (eds.). The New Oxford Annotated Bible with the Apocryphal/Deuterocanonical Books: New Revised Standard Version, Issue 48 (Augmented 3rd ed.). Oxford University Press. ISBN 9780195288810.
- Dietrich, Walter (2007). "13. 1 and 2 Kings". In Barton, John; Muddiman, John (eds.). The Oxford Bible Commentary (first (paperback) ed.). Oxford University Press. pp. 232–266. ISBN 978-0199277186.
- Halley, Henry H. (1965). Halley's Bible Handbook: an abbreviated Bible commentary (24th (revised) ed.). Zondervan Publishing House. ISBN 0-310-25720-4.
- Leithart, Peter J. (2006). 1 & 2 Kings. Brazos Theological Commentary on the Bible. Brazos Press. ISBN 978-1587431258.
- McFall, Leslie (1991), "Translation Guide to the Chronological Data in Kings and Chronicles" (PDF), Bibliotheca Sacra, 148: 3–45, archived from the original (PDF) on 2010-08-27
- McKane, William (1993). "Kings, Book of". In Metzger, Bruce M; Coogan, Michael D (eds.). The Oxford Companion to the Bible. Oxford University Press. pp. 409–413. ISBN 978-0195046458.
- Würthwein, Ernst (1995). The Text of the Old Testament. Translated by Rhodes, Erroll F. Grand Rapids, MI: Wm. B. Eerdmans. ISBN 0-8028-0788-7.
