= 2 Chronicles 18 =

Second Book of Chronicles, chapter 18

- ← chapter 17 chapter 19 →
- The complete Hebrew text of the Books of Chronicles (1st and 2nd Chronicles) in the Leningrad Codex (1008 CE).
- Book: Books of Chronicles
- Category: Ketuvim
- Christian Bible part: Old Testament
- Order in the Christian part: 14

2 Chronicles 18 is the eighteenth chapter of the Second Book of Chronicles the Old Testament in the Christian Bible or of the second part of the Books of Chronicles in the Hebrew Bible. The book is compiled from older sources by an unknown person or group, designated by modern scholars as "the Chronicler", and had the final shape established in late fifth or fourth century BCE. This chapter belongs to the section focusing on the kingdom of Judah until its destruction by the Babylonians under Nebuchadnezzar and the beginning of restoration under Cyrus the Great of Persia (2 Chronicles 10 to 36). The focus of this chapter (as all chapters from 17 to 20) is the reign of Jehoshaphat, king of Judah.

== Text ==
This chapter was originally written in the Hebrew language and is divided into 34 verses.

=== Textual witnesses ===
Some early manuscripts containing the text of this chapter in Hebrew are of the Masoretic Text tradition, which includes the Aleppo Codex (10th century), and Codex Leningradensis (1008).

There is also a translation into Koine Greek known as the Septuagint, made in the last few centuries BCE. Extant ancient manuscripts of the Septuagint version include Codex Vaticanus (B; $\mathfrak{G}$^{B}; 4th century), and Codex Alexandrinus (A; $\mathfrak{G}$^{A}; 5th century). (Note: The whole book of 2 Chronicles is missing from the extant Codex Sinaiticus.)

=== Old Testament references ===
- 2 Chronicles 18:1–11: 1 Kings 22:1–12
- 2 Chronicles 18:12–27: 1 Kings 22:13–28
- 2 Chronicles 18:28–34: 1 Kings 22:29–40

== Analysis ==
This chapter parallels closely with 1 Kings 22:1–40 (especially from verse 4) with a different introduction (the Chronicles did not mention the three-year conflicts between the northern kingdom of Israel and Aram leading to the battle) and conclusion (shorter narrative of Ahab's death than 1 Kings 22), mainly to demonstrate that 'true YHWH-prophecy also existed in the northern kingdom'. The alliance with Ahab was Jehoshaphat's first of the two missteps (both involving the northern kingdom).

== Jehoshaphat’s alliance with Ahab (18:1–11) ==
Verse 1 refers to 2 Chronicles 17:5 concerning Jehoshaphat's wealth and to 2 Kings 8:18, 27 about the marriage of Jehoshaphat's son, Joram, with Ahab's daughter, Athaliah (2 Chronicles 21:6; 22:2; cf. 2 Kings 8:18), probably driven by mutual political interests, but driving the royalty of Judah away from the Lord (2 Chronicles 21:6; 22:3–5).

=== Verse 1 ===
Jehoshaphat had riches and honor in abundance; and by marriage he allied himself with Ahab.

- "By marriage he allied himself": from Hebrew: יתחתן yiṯ-kha-tên, that Jehoram the son of Jehoshaphat married Athaliah the daughter of Ahab (2 Kings 8:16; 2 Kings 8:18; 2 Kings 8:26). Athaliah was also called "daughter" of Omri (father of Ahab) in 2 Kings 8:26 (which means "grand-daughter").

== Micaiah's message of defeat (18:12–27) ==
Micaiah's speech describes a meeting of the Lord with his heavenly council (verses 18–22; cf. Job 1:6; 2:1; Psalm 82:1) where the prophet was a witness to the conversation (cf. Jeremiah 23:18, 22).

=== Verse 27 ===
And Micaiah said, "If you return in peace, the Lord has not spoken by me." And he said, "Hear, all you peoples!"

- Cross references: 1 Kings 22:28

The last words of the prophet Micaiah the son of Imlah (שמעו עמים כלם, šim-‘ū ‘amîm kulām, "hear all you peoples") are exactly the first words of the prophet Micah the Morasthite in the Book of Micah (Micah 1:2).

== Death of Ahab, king of Israel (18:28–34) ==
This section parallels closely to with some differences in the last parts, such as in verse 34, the sentence [Ahab] "was (or, continued) holding himself up in the chariot, facing Aram, until the evening" is a clearer rendering of 1 Kings 22:35 which reads that [Ahab] "was held up in the chariot, ... and he died in the evening", as well as the omission of the remaining narrative regarding the return of the army and the washing of Ahab's chariot at the pool of Samaria (1 Kings 22:36-38), which did not concern Jehoshaphat.

== See also ==
- Ben-Hadad I
- Elijah
- Kurkh Monoliths
- Spirit of the Lord
- Related Bible parts: 1 Kings 22, 2 Kings 8, 2 Chronicles 21, Micah 1

== Sources ==
- Ackroyd, Peter R (1993). "Chronicles, Books of". In Metzger, Bruce M; Coogan, Michael D (eds.). The Oxford Companion to the Bible. Oxford University Press. pp. 113–116. ISBN 978-0195046458.
- Bennett, William (2018). The Expositor's Bible: The Books of Chronicles. Litres. ISBN 978-5040825196.
- Coogan, Michael David (2007). Coogan, Michael David; Brettler, Marc Zvi; Newsom, Carol Ann; Perkins, Pheme (eds.). The New Oxford Annotated Bible with the Apocryphal/Deuterocanonical Books: New Revised Standard Version, Issue 48 (Augmented 3rd ed.). Oxford University Press. ISBN 9780195288810.
- Mabie, Frederick (2017). "I. The Chronicler's Genealogical Survey of All Israel". In Longman III, Tremper; Garland, David E (eds.). 1 and 2 Chronicles. The Expositor's Bible Commentary. Zondervan. pp. 267–308. ISBN 978-0310531814.
- Mathys, H. P. (2007). "14. 1 and 2 Chronicles". In Barton, John; Muddiman, John (eds.). The Oxford Bible Commentary (first (paperback) ed.). Oxford University Press. pp. 267–308. ISBN 978-0199277186.
- McFall, Leslie (1991), "Translation Guide to the Chronological Data in Kings and Chronicles" (PDF), Bibliotheca Sacra, 148: 3-45, archived from the original (PDF) on 2010-08-27
- Thiele, Edwin R. (1983). The Mysterious Numbers of the Hebrew Kings (3rd ed.). Grand Rapids, Michigan: Zondervan. ISBN 978-0-310-36010-0.
- Würthwein, Ernst (1995). The Text of the Old Testament. Translated by Rhodes, Erroll F. Grand Rapids, MI: William B. Eerdmans. ISBN 0-8028-0788-7.
