= 1 Kings 20 =

1 Kings, chapter 20

- ← chapter 19 chapter 21 →
- The pages containing the Books of Kings (1 & 2 Kings) Leningrad Codex (1008 CE).
- Book: First book of Kings
- Hebrew Bible part: Nevi'im
- Order in the Hebrew part: 4
- Category: Former Prophets
- Christian Bible part: Old Testament
- Order in the Christian part: 11

1 Kings 20 is the 20th chapter of the Books of Kings in the Hebrew Bible or the First Book of Kings in the Old Testament of the Christian Bible. The book is a compilation of various annals recording the acts of the kings of Israel and Judah by a Deuteronomic compiler in the seventh century BCE, with a supplement added in the sixth century BCE. This chapter belongs to the section comprising 1 Kings 16:15 to 2 Kings 8:29 which documents the period of the Omrides. The focus of this chapter is the reign of king Ahab in the northern kingdom.

== Text ==
This chapter was originally written in the Hebrew language and since the 16th century is divided into 43 verses.

=== Textual witnesses ===
Some early manuscripts containing the text of this chapter in Hebrew are of the Masoretic Text tradition, which includes the Codex Cairensis (895), Aleppo Codex (10th century), and Codex Leningradensis (1008).

There is also a translation into Koine Greek known as the Septuagint, made in the last few centuries BCE. Extant ancient manuscripts of the Septuagint version include Codex Vaticanus (B; $\mathfrak{G}$^{B}; 4th century) and Codex Alexandrinus (A; $\mathfrak{G}$^{A}; 5th century). (Note: The whole book of 1 Kings is missing from the extant Codex Sinaiticus.) The extant palimpsest Aq^{Burkitt} contains verses 7–17 in Koine Greek translated by Aquila of Sinope approximately in the early or mid-second century CE.

== Ahab's victory over the Arameans (20:1–34) ==
1 Kings 20 and 22 record a series of wars between an Aramean king, Ben-Hadad, and King Ahab of Israel. With the help of prophetic oracles, the Israelite king managed to repeatedly defeat an aggressive, arrogant and stronger enemy. The Arameans initially regarded YHWH to be 'a mountain god who had no power on the plains' (verses 23), based on the religious and social history that Yahweh's home was originally the mountains of southern Sinai and Edom (Exodus 3; Judges 5:4) and Israel was developed into an ethnic and political power on the mountains of Palestine (Judges 1:27-35; 1 Samuel 13–14; 2 Samuel 2:9). However, at the end it was shown that the entire country belongs to Yahweh (and his people), even Ahab managed to force Ben-Hadad to accept the establishment of an Israelite trading office in Damascus (verse 34). This period may fit the record from Assyrian sources that Ahab and the Aramean king, Adad-idri (Aramaic: "Hadadezer") were closely allied to each other to fight Assyrian army (ANET 276–277).

=== Verse 34 ===
So Ben-Hadad said to him, "The cities which my father took from your father I will restore; and you may set up marketplaces for yourself in Damascus, as my father did in Samaria."
Then Ahab said, "I will send you away with this treaty." So he made a treaty with him and sent him away.

- "My father took from your father": may refer to Baasha during whose reign the Arameans (Syrians) took some cities from the kingdom of Israel (1 Kings 15:20), so "father" here has the sense of "predecessor", or refer to Omri, Ahab's father, who might have war with the Syrians but not recorded in the Scripture (1 Kings 16:27).

=== Chiastic structure ===
Biblical scholar Burke O. Long (1985) pointed out that these verses have a chiastic structure:

A: Negotiations (Ben-hadad and Ahab) vv. 1–11

B: Battle for Samaria vv. 12–21

X: Transition: Prophet's Counsel v. 22

B': Battle of Aphek vv. 23–30

A': Negotiations (Ben-hadad and Ahab) vv. 31–34

== A prophetic warning to Ahab (20:35–43) ==
The positive outcome of the war against Aram was tarnished by Ahab's action to make business contracts with Benhadad, instead of killing him ("devoted him to destruction", which was an 'underlying principle of Deuteronomistic theory and historical writing'; cf. Deuteronomy 13:12–18; 20:16–18; Joshua 6–7; 11:10–15, etc.). The prophetic rebuke was given through a prophet's ingenious scheming which forced the king to call out his own error and 'bring judgement upon himself' (cf. as Nathan did to David in 2 Samuel 12).

=== Verse 42 ===
And he said to him, "Thus says the Lord, ‘Because you have let go out of your hand the man whom I had devoted to destruction,[a] therefore your life shall be for his life, and your people for his people."

- "Devoted to destruction": or "set apart (devoted) as an offering to the Lord (for destruction)". Like Saul who released an enemy king whom God had "devoted to destruction" (1 Samuel 15), Ahab's life was forfeit because he released Benhadad.

== See also ==
- Aphek (biblical)
- Damascus
- Israel
- Jezreel
- Prophet
- Samaria
- Syria
- Related Bible parts: Deuteronomy 13, Joshua 6, Joshua 7, 1 Samuel 15, 2 Samuel 12, 1 Kings 15, 1 Kings 16

== Sources ==
- Collins, John J. (2014). "Chapter 14: 1 Kings 12 – 2 Kings 25". Introduction to the Hebrew Scriptures. Fortress Press. pp. 277–296. ISBN 978-1451469233.
- Coogan, Michael David (2007). Coogan, Michael David; Brettler, Marc Zvi; Newsom, Carol Ann; Perkins, Pheme (eds.). The New Oxford Annotated Bible with the Apocryphal/Deuterocanonical Books: New Revised Standard Version, Issue 48 (Augmented 3rd ed.). Oxford University Press. ISBN 978-0195288810.
- Dietrich, Walter (2007). "13. 1 and 2 Kings". In Barton, John; Muddiman, John (eds.). The Oxford Bible Commentary (first (paperback) ed.). Oxford University Press. pp. 232–266. ISBN 978-0199277186.
- Halley, Henry H. (1965). Halley's Bible Handbook: an abbreviated Bible commentary (24th (revised) ed.). Zondervan Publishing House. ISBN 0-310-25720-4.
- Hayes, Christine (2015). Introduction to the Bible. Yale University Press. ISBN 978-0300188271.
- Leithart, Peter J. (2006). 1 & 2 Kings. Brazos Theological Commentary on the Bible. Brazos Press. ISBN 978-1587431258.
- McKane, William (1993). "Kings, Book of". In Metzger, Bruce M; Coogan, Michael D (eds.). The Oxford Companion to the Bible. Oxford University Press. pp. 409–413. ISBN 978-0195046458.
- Long, Burke O. (1985). "Historical Narrative and the Fictionalizing Imagination". Vetus Testamentum. 35 (4). Brill: 405–416. doi:10.2307/1517757. ISSN 0042-4935. JSTOR 1517757.
- Metzger, Bruce M; Coogan, Michael D, eds. (1993). The Oxford Companion to the Bible. Oxford University Press. ISBN 978-0195046458.
- Würthwein, Ernst (1995). The Text of the Old Testament. Translated by Rhodes, Erroll F. Grand Rapids, MI: Wm. B. Eerdmans. ISBN 0-8028-0788-7.
