= AqTaylor =

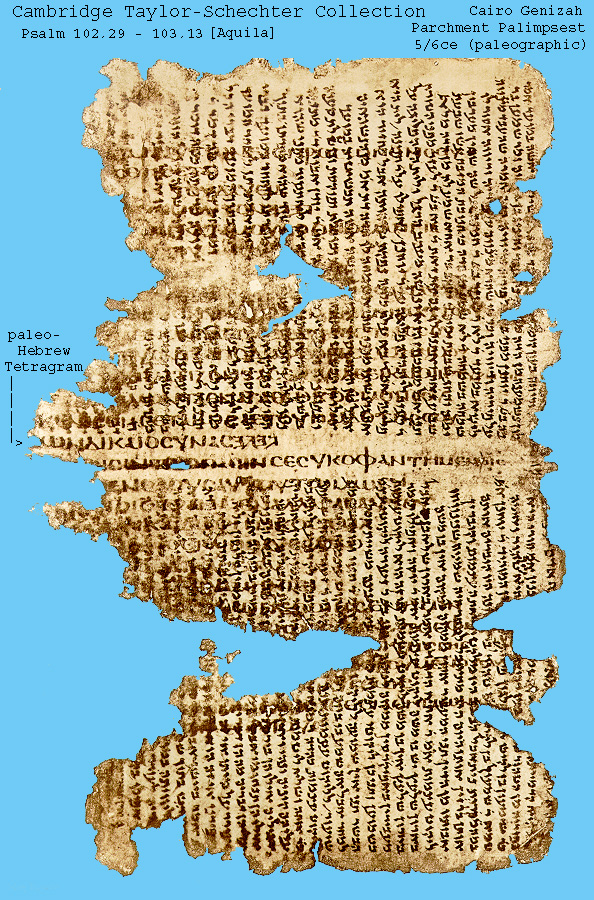
Psalms 102:29-103:13

The siglum AqTaylor (also: Taylor-Schechter 12.186 + AS.78.412; 12.187; 12.188; vh203, TM 62306, LDAB 3469) are fragments of a palimpsest containing a portion of the Palestinian Talmud in upper script, and part of the Book of Psalms of Aquila's Greek translation of the Hebrew Bible in lower script. This latter is a Greek biblical manuscript written in codex form. This manuscript has been dated after the middle of the fifth century C.E., but not later than the beginning of the sixth century C.E.

== History ==
A number of manuscripts were found at Geniza, in the Ben Ezra Synagogue, Egypt, and these palimpsest fragments were brought to Cambridge by Solomon Schechter. The fragments were published by Charles Taylor in his work Hebrew-Greek Cairo Genizah Palimpsests in 1900, pp. 54–65.

== Description ==
The manuscript consists of three leaves. The manuscript contains two texts: the text of part of the Greek translation of the Hebrew Bible, and the Palestinian Talmud. The texts have been written 90 degrees apart.

=== Aquila's translation ===
Aquila's translation was undertaken around the year c.130 C.E. Aquila's text contains parts of Psalms 90-103. The fragments contain Psalms 90:17, 91:1-16, 92:1-10, 93:3, 96:7-13, 97:1-12, 102:16-29, and 103:1-13. According to Taylor, the script of this manuscript is similar to that of the AqBurkitt, in bold uncial letters, without capital letter either at beginnings or paragraphs or as the first letter of the page.

==== Tetragrammaton ====
The manuscript is written in koine Greek, but it contains the tetragrammaton in archaic Hebrew script characters in Ps 91:2, 9; 92:1, 4, 5, 8, 9; 96:7, 7, 8, 9, 10, 13; 97:1, 5, 9, 10, 12; 102:15, 16, 19, 21; 103:1, 2, 6, 8.

=== Palestinian Talmud ===
The upper text is the Palestinian Talmud written in Hebrew.

== Location ==
Today the manuscript is kept at Library of the University of Cambridge.

== See also ==
- Septuagint manuscripts
- Papyrus Rylands 458 the oldest manuscript

== Sources ==
- Andrews, Edward D. (2016). The Complete Guide to Bible Translation: Bible Translation Choices and Translation Principles. Christian Publishing House. ISBN 9780692728710.
- Burkitt, Francis Crawford (1897). Fragments of the Books of Kings According to the Translation of Aquila. Cambridge: University Press. ISBN 1117070484. OCLC 5222981.
- "Cambridge, UL, T-S 12.186 + Cambridge, UL, T-S 12.187 + Cambridge, UL, T-S 12.188". The Greek Bible in Byzantine Judaism.
- Gallagher, Edmon (2013). "The Religious Provenance of the Aquila Manuscripts from the Cairo Genizah". Journal of Jewish Studies. 64 (2): 283–305. doi:10.18647/3141/JJS-2013.
- Marcos, Natalio Fernández (2001-11-06). Watson, Wilfred (ed.). The Septuagint in Context: Introduction to the Greek Version of the Bible. Biblical Studies and Religious Studies. BRILL. ISBN 978-03-91-04109-7.
- Roueché, Charlotte; Holmes, Catherine; Waring, Judith (2012). Literacy, Education and Manuscript Transmission in Byzantium and Beyond. Brill.
- Schürer, Emil; Vermes, Geza; Millar, Fergus (2014). The History of the Jewish People in the Age of Jesus Christ: Volume 3.i. A&C Black. ISBN 9780567604521.
- Taylor, Charles (1900). Hebrew-Greek Cairo Genizatt Palimpsests from the Taylor-Schechter Collection including a Fragment of the Twenty Second Psalm According to the Origen's Hexapla. Cambridge University Press.
- Trismegistos. "TM 62306 / LDAB 3469".
