= Chronology of the Bible =

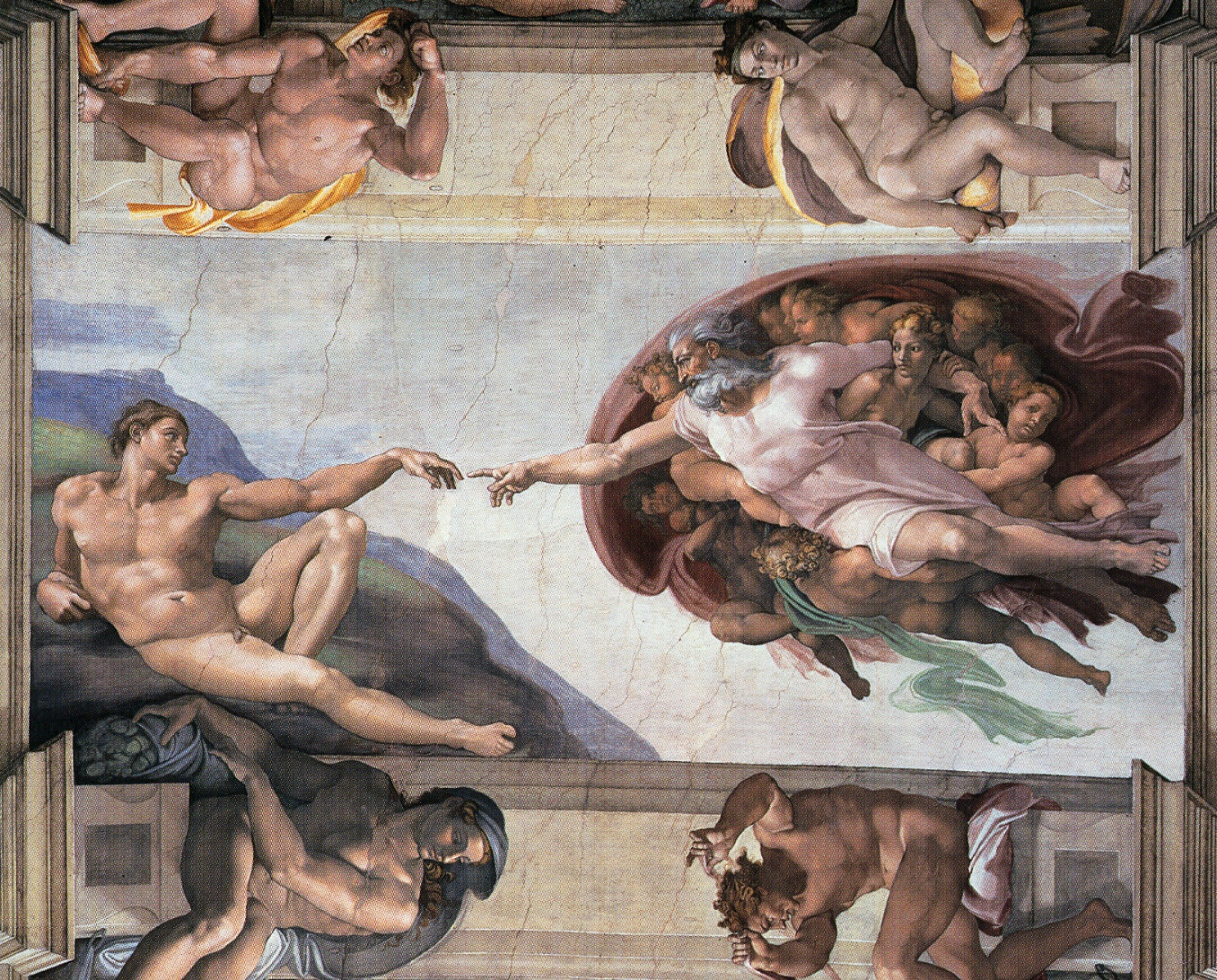
The Creation of Adam (c. 1512) by Michelangelo – Sistine Chapel

The chronology of the Bible is an elaborate system of lifespans, "generations", and other means by which the Masoretic Hebrew Bible (the text of the Bible most commonly in use today) measures the passage of events from the creation to around 164 BCE (the year of the re-dedication of the Second Temple). It was theological in intent, not historical in the modern sense, and functions as an implied prophecy whose key lies in the identification of the final event. The passage of time is measured initially by adding the ages of the Patriarchs at the birth of their firstborn sons, later through express statements, and later still by the synchronised reigns of the kings of Israel and Judah.

The chronology is highly schematic, marking out a world cycle of 4,000 years. The Exodus takes place in the year A.M. 2666 (Anno Mundi, years since the creation of the world), exactly two-thirds of the way through the 4,000-year period: the construction of Solomon's Temple commences 480 years afterward—12 generations of 40 years each—and 430 years pass between the building of Solomon's Temple and its destruction during the siege of Jerusalem. The 50 years between the destruction of the Temple and the "Decree of Cyrus" and end of the Babylonian Exile, added to the 430 years for which the Temple stood, produces another symmetrical period of 480 years. The 374 years between the Edict of Cyrus and the re-dedication of the Second Temple by the Maccabees complete the 4,000-year cycle.

As recently as the 17th and 18th centuries, the Archbishop of Armagh James Ussher (term 1625–1656), and scholars of the stature of Isaac Newton (1642–1727) believed that dating creation was knowable from the Bible. Today, the Genesis creation narrative has long since vanished from serious cosmology, the Patriarchs and the Exodus are no longer included in most histories of ancient Israel, and it is very widely accepted that the Book of Joshua has little historical value. Even the United Monarchy is questioned, and although scholars continue to advance proposals for reconciling the chronology of the Books of Kings, there is "little consensus on acceptable methods of dealing with conflicting data".

== Pre-Masoretic chronologies ==
During the centuries that Hebrew Bible canon developed, theological chronologies emerged at different composition stages, although scholars have advanced various theories to identify these stages and their schematizations of time. These chronologies include:

- A "Progenitor" chronology that placed Abraham's birth at Anno Mundi (AM) 1600 and the foundation of the Temple at AM 2800. Alfred Jepsen proposed this chronology on the basis of melding time periods in the Samaritan and Masoretic recensions.
- Distinct chronologies can be inferred from the Priestly source (of the Torah), along with priestly authors of later biblical books, and the Deuteronomistic history, which purports to chronicle the reigns of the kings of Judah and Israel (with some significant historical corroboration, see below and History of ancient Israel and Judah).
- The Nehemiah chronology, devised to show 3,500 years from creation to Nehemiah's mission. Northcote says that this chronology was "probably composed by Levites in Jerusalem not long after Nehemiah's mission, perhaps sometime late in the fifth century BCE (i.e. nearing 400 BCE)." Bousset (1900) apparently sees this schematization, too, but calls it Proto-MT.
- A proto-Masoretic chronology, shaped by jubilees, with an overall literary showing of 3,480 years from creation to the completion of the Second Temple, per B. W. Bousset (1900), and which had the First Temple at 3,000 years.
- The Saros chronology that reflected 3,600 years leading up to the First Temple and 4,080 years from creation to the completion of the Second Temple. This scheme served as "the basis for the later Septuagint chronology and pre-SP Samaritan Pentateuch chronologies".

== Masoretic Text ==
The Masoretic Text is the basis of modern Jewish and Christian bibles. While difficulties with biblical texts make it impossible to reach sure conclusions, perhaps the most widely held hypothesis is that it embodies an overall scheme of 4,000 years (a "great year") taking the re-dedication of the Temple by the Maccabees in 164 BCE as its end-point. Two motives may have led to this: first, there was a common idea at the time of the Maccabees that human history followed the plan of a divine "week" of seven "days" each lasting a thousand years; and second, a 4,000 year history (even longer in the Septuagint version) would establish the antiquity of the Jews against their pagan neighbours. However, Ronald Hendel argues that it is unlikely that 2nd century BCE Jews would have known that 374 years had passed from the Edict of Cyrus to the re-dedication of the Temple, and disputes the idea that the Masoretic chronology actually reflects a 4,000 year scheme. The following table summarises the Masoretic chronology from the creation of the world in Anno Mundi (Year of the World) 1 to its endpoint in AM 4000:

Masoretic Date (AM)	Event	Note
AM 1 (4163 BCE)	Creation (Adam)	From Creation to Abraham, time is calculated by adding the ages of the Patriarchs when their first child is born. It is possible that the period of the Genesis flood narrative is not meant to be included in the count, as Shem, born 100 years before the flood, "begot" his first son two years after it, which should make him 102, but Genesis 11:10–11 specifies that he is only 100, suggesting that time has been suspended.
AM 1948 (2216 BCE)	Birth of Abraham	The period from the birth of Shem's son to Abraham's migration to Canaan is 365 years, mirroring Enoch's life-span of 365 years, the number of days in a tropical year. There are 10 Patriarchs between Adam and the flood narrative and 10 between the flood narrative and Abraham, although the Septuagint adds an extra ancestor so that the second group of 10 runs from the flood narrative to Terah. Noah and Terah each have three sons, of whom the first in each case is the most important.
AM 2236 (1928 BCE)	Entrance into Egypt	The period between Abraham's call to enter Canaan (AM 2021) and Jacob's entry into Biblical Egypt is 215 years, calculated from the ages of Abraham, Isaac, and Jacob; the period in Egypt is stated in the Book of Exodus (12:40) as 430 years, although the Septuagint and the Samaritan Pentateuch texts both give only 430 years between Abraham and Moses. Paul the Apostle, a writer of the New Testament, agrees with them and against the Hebrew Bible.
AM 2666 (1498 BCE)	Exodus	Exodus 12:40 says that Israel was in Egypt 430 years, Genesis 15:13 predicts that the oppression will last 400 years, Exodus 6:14–25 says this is made up of four generations (Levi to Moses), and Genesis 15:16 predicts Abraham's descendants will return in the fourth generation. The alternatives cannot be matched exactly, but the number 4 seems to play a central role in all of them. The Exodus takes place in (AM 2666), exactly two-thirds of the way through the 4,000 years, marking it as the pivotal event of the chronology. It is also two-thirds of the way through the 40 notional "generations" of 100 years each, with Aaron, the first High Priest of Israel, representing the 26th generation from Adam.
AM 3146 (1018 BCE)	Solomon's temple	The period from the foundation of Solomon's Temple in Solomon's fourth regnal year to its destruction in the siege of Jerusalem is 430 years. This is found by adding the reigns of the kings of the United Kingdom of Israel and of the Kingdom of Judah from the fourth regnal year of Solomon. The fourth regnal year of Solomon came exactly 1,200 years after the birth of Abraham (Abraham was born in AM 1946 if the two years of the flood narrative are excluded). There were exactly 20 kings in both Judah and the Kingdom of Israel following Solomon, despite Judah lasting more than a century longer than Israel. "It seems very likely that [some of the minor kings of Israel] have served simply to make up the numbers."
AM 3576 (588 BCE)	Exile	The period from the Siege of Jerusalem and the destruction of Solomon's Temple (AM 3576) to Cyrus's edict and the end of the Exile (AM 3626) is 50 years. Added to the 430 years for which the Temple stood, they produce another symmetrical period of 480 years.
AM 3626 (538 BCE)	Edict of Cyrus	Scholars have established that the Babylonian captivity lasted approximately fifty years, but the Book of Jeremiah puts it at 70 years, "clearly on ideological grounds" (the number 7 symbolises divine perfection, 10 symbolises fullness, and 7x10 gives 70 years). The Book of Ezra uses a 50-year time-frame when it places the commencement of the Second Temple in Cyrus the Great's first regnal year (538 BCE), in accordance with the jubilee law of the Book of Leviticus.
AM 4000 (164 BCE)	Rededication of the Temple	The final period is the 374 years between Cyrus's edicts (538 BCE) and the re-dedication of the Second Temple by the Maccabees (164 BCE). The overall 4,000 year cycle is calculated backwards from this point.

== Other chronologies: Septuagint, Samaritan, Jubilees, Seder Olam ==
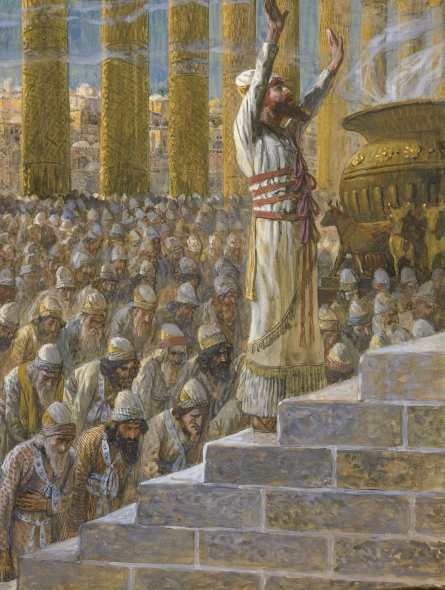
Solomon Dedicates the Temple (James Tissot)

The canonical text of the Hebrew Bible is called the Masoretic Text, a text preserved by Jewish rabbis from early in the 7th and 10th centuries CE. There are, however, two other major texts, the Septuagint and the Samaritan Pentateuch. The Septuagint is a Koine Greek translation of earlier versions of the original Biblical Hebrew holy books. It is estimated that the first five books of the Septuagint, known as the Torah or Pentateuch, were translated in the mid-3rd century BCE and the remaining texts were translated in the 2nd century BCE. It mostly agrees with the Masoretic Text, but not in its chronology.

The Samaritan text is preserved by the Samaritan community. This community dates from some time in the last few centuries BCE—just when is disputed—and, like the Septuagint, their Bible differs markedly from the Masoretic Text in its chronology. Modern scholars do not regard the Masoretic Text as superior to the other two—the Masoretic is sometimes clearly wrong, as when it says that Saul began to reign at one year of age and reigned for two years. More relevantly, all three texts have a clear purpose, which is not to record history so much as to bring the narrative to a point which represents the culmination of history. In the Samaritan Pentateuch, the genealogies and narratives were shaped to ensure a chronology of 3000 years from creation to the Israelite settlement of Canaan. Northcote reports this as the "Proto-SP chronology", as designated by John Skinner (1910), and he speculates that this chronology may have been extended to put the rebuilding of the Second Temple at an even AM 3900, after three 1,300-year phases. In the Septuagint version of the Pentateuch the Israelite chronology extends 4,777 years from creation to the finishing of the Second Temple, as witnessed in the Codex Alexandrinus manuscript. This calculation only emerges by supplementing Septuagint with the MT's chronology of kings. There were at least three variations of Septuagint chronology; Eusebius used one variation, now favored by Hughes and others. Northcote asserts that the Septuagint calendrical pattern was meant to demonstrate that there were 5,000 years from creation to a contemporaneous Ptolemaic Egypt, c. 300 BCE.

The 2nd-century BCE Book of Jubilees begins with the Creation and measures time in years, "weeks" of years (groups of seven years), and jubilees (sevens of sevens), so that the interval from Creation to the settlement of Canaan, for example, is exactly fifty jubilees (2450 years).

Dating from the 2nd century CE, and still in common use among Jews, was the Seder Olam Rabbah ("Great Order of the World"), a work tracing the history of the world and the Jews from Creation to the 2nd century CE. It allows 410 years for the duration of the First Temple, 70 years from its destruction to the Second Temple, and 420 years for the duration of the Second Temple, making a total of 900 years for the two temples. This schematic approach to numbers accounts for its most remarkable feature, the fact that it shortens the entire Persian Empire from over two centuries to just 52 years, mirroring the 52 years it gives to the Babylonian exile.

== Christian use and development of biblical chronology ==
The early church father Eusebius (c. 260–340), attempting to place Christ in the chronology, put his birth in AM 5199, and this became the accepted date for the Western Church. As the year AM 6000 (800 CE) approached there was increasing fear that the end of the world was nigh, until the Venerable Bede made his own calculations and found that Christ's birth took place in AM 3952, allowing several more centuries to the end of time.

Martin Luther (1483–1546) switched the point of focus from Christ's birth to the Apostolic Council of Acts 15, which he placed in the year AM 4000, believing this marked the moment when the Mosaic Law was abolished and the new age of grace began. This was widely accepted among European Protestants, but in the English-speaking world, Archbishop James Ussher (1581–1656) calculated a date of 4004 BCE for creation; he was not the first to reach this result, but his chronology was so detailed that his dates were incorporated into the margins of English Bibles for the next two hundred years. This popular 4,000 year theological timespan, which ends with the birth of Jesus, differs from the 4,000 timespan later proposed interpretations of the Masoretic text, which ends with the Temple rededication in 164 BCE.

=== Chronology in the visions of Anne Catherine Emmerich ===
The German Catholic mystic Anne Catherine Emmerich, in accounts of her reported visions published posthumously in The Life of Jesus Christ and Biblical Revelations, described Jesus as correcting chronological errors attributed to the Egyptian priests. In a vision of Jesus teaching the people and Pharisees at Aruma, she reported that Jesus stated that the world had existed for 4,028 years and that he was 31 years old at the time, which would place his birth at approximately AM 3997. In another account, Emmerich stated that Christ was born before the completion of the year AM 3997, and that subsequent chronological calculations had incorrectly placed the beginning of the Christian era several years later. The editorial commentary accompanying this account discusses her proposed date in relation to historical chronologies. In her account concerning Semiramis and Egypt, Emmerich described Egyptian priests and rulers as deliberately altering chronological calculations and royal genealogies to make their civilization appear older than those of other nations. She attributed these distortions to changes in calendar calculations, the insertion of fictitious rulers into genealogies, and the counting of rulers who reigned simultaneously as successive monarchs. She further reported seeing Jesus expose errors in the Egyptian calendar during his teaching at Aruma.

In another account concerning Joseph and Aseneth, Emmerich addressed the chronology of the Israelites’ time in Egypt. She reportedly stated that the period from Joseph’s death to the departure of the Israelites from Egypt amounted to approximately 170 years according to “our manner of reckoning”, while noting that the people of that time used a different system of calculating time. She added that the alternative system involved “other weeks and years”, but said that she could no longer recall the explanation she had received concerning it.

== The Israelite kings ==
The chronology of the monarchy, unlike that of earlier periods, can be checked against non-biblical sources and seems to be correct in general terms. This raises the prospect that the Books of Kings, linking the Hebrew kings by accession and length of reign ("king X of Judah came to the throne in the nth year of king Y of Israel and ruled n years"), can be used to reconstruct a chronology for the monarchy, but the task has in fact proven intractably difficult. The problem is that the books contain numerous contradictions: to take just one example, since Rehoboam of Judah and Jeroboam of Israel began to rule at the same time (1 Kings 12), and since Ahaziah of Judah and Joram of Israel were killed at the same time (2 Kings 9:24, 27), the same amount of time should have elapsed in both kingdoms, but the count shows 95 years passing in Judah and 98 in Israel. In short, "[t]he data concerning the synchronisms appeared in hopeless contradiction with the data as to the lengths of reigns."

Possibly the most widely followed attempt to reconcile the contradictions has been that proposed by Edwin R. Thiele in his The Mysterious Numbers of the Hebrew Kings (three editions between 1951 and 1983), but his work has been widely criticised for, among other things, introducing "innumerable" co-regencies, constructing a "complex system of calendars", and using "unique" patterns of calculation; as a result his following is largely among scholars "committed ... to a doctrine of scripture's absolute harmony" (the criticism is to be found in Brevard Childs' Introduction to the Old Testament as Scripture). The weaknesses in Thiele's work have led subsequent scholars to continue to propose chronologies, but, in the words of a recent commentary on Kings, there is "little consensus on acceptable methods of dealing with conflicting data."

== See also ==
- Biblical cosmology
- Biblical literalist chronology
- Chronology of the ancient Near East
- Chronology of Babylonia and Assyria
- Dating creation
- Development of the Hebrew Bible canon
- Development of the Old Testament canon
- Development of the New Testament canon
- History of ancient Israel and Judah
- Intertestamental period
- Jewish chronology
- Kings of Judah
- Missing years (Jewish calendar)
- Universal history
- Ussher chronology

== Sources ==
- Alter, Robert (1997). Genesis: Translation and Commentary. W. W. Norton & Company. ISBN 978-0393070262.
- Auld, A. Graeme (2010). "Samuel, Sources, and Historiography". In Grabbe, Lester L. (ed.). Israel in Transition 2: From Late Bronze II to Iron IIA. Bloomsbury Publishing USA. ISBN 978-0567638403.
- Barr, James (2001). "Chronology". In Metzger, Bruce M.; Coogan, Michael David (eds.). The Oxford Guide to Ideas & Issues of the Bible. Oxford University Press. ISBN 978-0195149173.
- Barr, James (1987). "Biblical Chronology: Legend or Science?" (PDF). Ethel M. Wood lecture. Archived from the original (PDF) on 23 July 2020.
- Blenkinsopp, Joseph (2006). Opening the Sealed Book: Interpretations of the Book of Isaiah in Late Antiquity. Eerdmans. ISBN 978-0802840219.
- Christensen, Duane L. (1990). "Chronology". In Mills, Watson E.; Bullard, Roger Aubrey (eds.). Mercer Dictionary of the Bible. Mercer University Press. ISBN 978-0865543737.
- Davies, Philip R. (2008). Memories of Ancient Israel. Westminster John Knox Press. ISBN 978-0664232887.
- Finkelstein, Israel; Mazar, Amihay (2007). The Quest for the Historical Israel. Society of Biblical Literature. ISBN 978-1589832770.
- Galil, Gershom (1996). The Chronology of the Kings of Israel and Judah. Brill. ISBN 9004106111.
- Grabbe, Lester L. (2002). Judaic Religion in the Second Temple Period: Belief and Practice from the Exile to Yavneh. Routledge. ISBN 978-1134615629.
- Guillaume, Philippe (2007). "Tracing the Origin of the Sabbatical Calendar in the Priestly Narrative". In Zvi, Ehud Ben (ed.). Perspectives on Hebrew Scriptures (II, Volume 5). Gorgias Press. ISBN 978-1593336127.
- Hendel, Ronald (2012). "A Hasmonean Edition of MT Genesis?: The Implications of the Editions of the Chronology in Genesis 5". Hebrew Bible and Ancient Israel. 1 (4): 448–464. doi:10.1628/219222712805363999.
- Hughes, Jeremy (1990). Secrets of the Times: Myth and History in Biblical Chronology. A&C Black. ISBN 978-0567629302.
- Johnson, Marshall D. (2002). The Purpose of the Biblical Genealogies. Wipf and Stock Publishers. ISBN 978-1579102746.
- Konkel, August H. (2010). 1 and 2 Kings. Zondervan. ISBN 978-0310865629.
- Larsson, Gerhard (1973). The Secret System. Brill. ISBN 9004036679.
- Lemche, Niels Peter (2010). The A to Z of Ancient Israel. Rowman & Littlefield. ISBN 978-0810875654.
- Matthews, K.A. (1996). Genesis 1–11. B&H Publishing Group. ISBN 978-0805401011.
- Milikowski, Chaim (2011). "Seder Olam". In Berlin, Adele (ed.). The Oxford Dictionary of the Jewish Religion. Oxford University Press. ISBN 978-0199730049.
- Moore, Megan Bishop; Kelle, Brad E. (2011). Biblical History and Israel's Past. Eerdmans. ISBN 978-0802862600.
- Najm, S.; Guillaume, Ph. (2007). "Jubilee Calendar Rescued from the Flood Narrative". In Zvi, Ehud Ben (ed.). Perspectives on Hebrew Scriptures II, Volume 5. Gorgias Press. ISBN 978-1593336127.
- Northcote, Jeremy (2004). "The schematic development of Old Testament Chronography: Towards an integrated model" (PDF). Journal for the Study of the Old Testament. 29 (1). Sage Publications: 3–36. doi:10.1177/030908920402900101. S2CID 145179289.
- Ruiten, Jacques T. A. G. M. (2000). Primaeval History Interpreted: The Rewriting of Genesis 1-11 in the Book of Jubilees. BRILL. ISBN 9004116583.
- Solomon, Norman (2006). Historical Dictionary of Judaism. Scarecrow Press. ISBN 978-0810864986.
- Tetley, Christine (2005). The Reconstructed Chronology of the Divided Kingdom. Eisenbraun. ISBN 978-1575060729.
- Thiele, Edwin R. (1983). The Mysterious Numbers of the Hebrew Kings (3rd ed.). Grand Rapids, Michigan: Zondervan. ISBN 978-0-310-36010-0.
- Thompson, Thomas L. (2007). The Mythic Past: Biblical Archaeology and the Myth of Israel. Basic Books. ISBN 978-0465010523.
- Towner, Wayne Sibley (2001). Genesis. Westminster John Knox Press. ISBN 978-0664252564.
- Waltke, Bruce K. (2011). An Old Testament Theology. Zondervan. ISBN 978-0310863328.
