= AqBurkitt =

6th-cent. Aquila Greek bible palimpsest

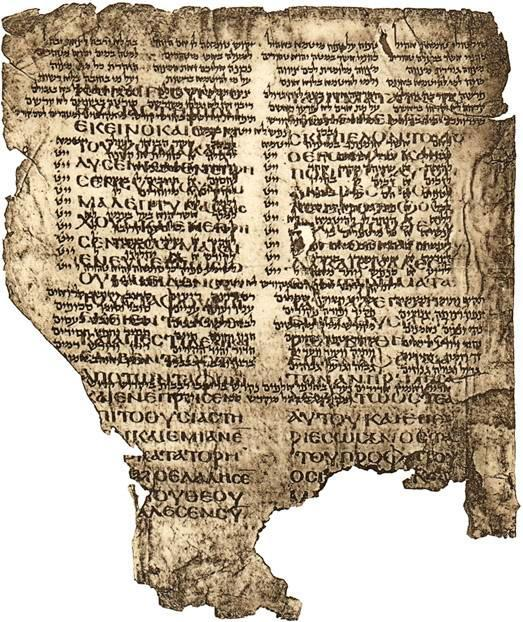
Palimpsest of the Second book of Kings of Aquila of Sinope

The Aq^{Burkitt} (also: Trismegistos nr: 62108, Taylor-Schechter 12.184 + Taylor-Schechter 20.50 = Taylor-Schlechter 2.89.326, vh074, t050, LDAB 3268) are fragments of a palimpsest containing a portion of the Books of Kings from Aquila's translation of the Hebrew bible from the 6th century, overwritten by some liturgical poems of Yannai dating from the 9–11th century. This Aquila translation was performed approximately in the early or mid-second century C.E. The manuscript is variously dated to the 6th-century CE, or 5th-6th century CE.

== History ==
A lot of manuscripts were found in the Cairo Geniza in Egypt and these palimpsest fragments were brought to Cambridge by Solomon Schechter. Aq^{Burkitt} was published by Francis Crawford Burkitt (this is where the name comes from) in Fragments of the Books of Kings According to the Translation of Aquila (1897). Burkitt concludes that the manuscript is indisputably Jewish because it comes from the Geniza, and because the Jews at the time of Justinian used the Aquila version. This remains the dominant view among academics who study the text, although a minority view that the scribe who copied it was a Christian exists among some scholars.

== Description ==
There are preserved "separate pairs of conjugate vellum leaves" of the manuscript (bifolium). Each leaf is 27 cm (11 in) tall by 44 cm (17 in) wide.

=== Aquila's text ===
Aquila's text is badly preserved. It has been written in two columns and 23 or 24 lines per page and contains parts of 1 Kings 20:7–17 (Note: Gallagher (2013, p. 3) says 1 Kings 21:7-17) and 2 Kings 23:11–27 (Note: Turner (1911, p. 856) says 2 Kings 23:12-17) (3 Kings xxi 7–17 and 4 Kings xxiii 11–27 according to Septuagint numbering). This palimpsest is written in koine Greek language, in bold uncial letters, without capital letters at beginnings or paragraphs or as the first letter of the pages. This is one of the few fragments that preserve part of the translation of Aquila, which has also been found in a few hexaplaric manuscripts.

==== Tetragrammaton and nomina sacra ====
The tetragrammaton is written in paleo-Hebrew script characters ( ) in following places: 1 Kings 20:13, 14; 2 Kings 23:12, 16, 21, 23, 25, 26, 27. The rendering of the letters yod and waw are generally identical and the sign used for it is a corruption of both letters. In one instance, where there was insufficient space at the end of a line, the tetragrammaton is given by κ̅υ̅, the nomen sacrum rendering of the genitive case of Κύριος which is unique in the Genizah manuscripts.

Aq^{Burkitt} has used to argue for the reception history of Aquila's translation among Jews or to the use of nomina sacra by Jews. In an article focused on the topic, Edmon L. Gallagher concludes that there is no certainty about whether it was a Jew or a Christian who transcribed Aq^{Burkitt}, and thus it cannot be used as evidence in these debates.

=== Yannai's text ===
The upper text is a liturgical work of Yannai written in Hebrew. This work contains Qerovot/Qerobot poems on four sedarim in Leviticus (13:29; 14:1; 21:1; 22:13), "which can be joined with other leaves in the Genizah to make a complete quire". The text was dated to 11th century C.E. by Schechter, but it may be older, even to the ninth century.

== Actual location ==
This fragment is currently stored in the Cambridge Digital Library.

== See also ==
- AqTaylor
- Hexapla
- Papyrus Rylands 458 the oldest manuscripts
- Septuagint manuscripts
