= 2 Kings 9 =

2 Kings, chapter 9

- ← chapter 8 chapter 10 →
- The pages containing the Books of Kings (1 & 2 Kings) Leningrad Codex (1008 CE).
- Book: Second Book of Kings
- Hebrew Bible part: Nevi'im
- Order in the Hebrew part: 4
- Category: Former Prophets
- Christian Bible part: Old Testament
- Order in the Christian part: 12

2 Kings 9 is the ninth chapter of the second part of the Books of Kings in the Hebrew Bible or the Second Book of Kings in the Old Testament of the Christian Bible. The book is a compilation of various annals recording the acts of the kings of Israel and Judah by a Deuteronomic compiler in the seventh century BCE, with a supplement added in the sixth century BCE. This chapter records Jehu's anointing as the next king of Israel and his assassinations of Jehoram of Israel, Ahaziah of Judah and Jezebel, the queen mother of Israel, as well as the fulfillment of Elijah's prophecy that dogs would eat the queen in the very city she died in, that being Jezreel, and that no one would bury her or even identify her remains as foretold in 1 Kings 21. The narrative is a part of a major section 2 Kings 9:1–15:12 covering the period of Jehu's dynasty.

== Text ==
This chapter was originally written in the Hebrew language and since the 16th century is divided into 37 verses.

=== Textual witnesses ===
Some early manuscripts containing the text of this chapter in Hebrew are of the Masoretic Text tradition, which includes the Codex Cairensis (895), Aleppo Codex (10th century), and Codex Leningradensis (1008). Fragments containing parts of this chapter in Hebrew were found among the Dead Sea Scrolls, that is, 6Q4 (6QpapKgs; 150–75 BCE) with extant verses 1–2.

There is also a translation into Koine Greek known as the Septuagint, made in the last few centuries BCE. Extant ancient manuscripts of the Septuagint version include Codex Vaticanus (B; $\mathfrak{G}$^{B}; 4th century) and Codex Alexandrinus (A; $\mathfrak{G}$^{A}; 5th century). (Note: The whole book of 2 Kings is missing from the extant Codex Sinaiticus.)

== Locations ==
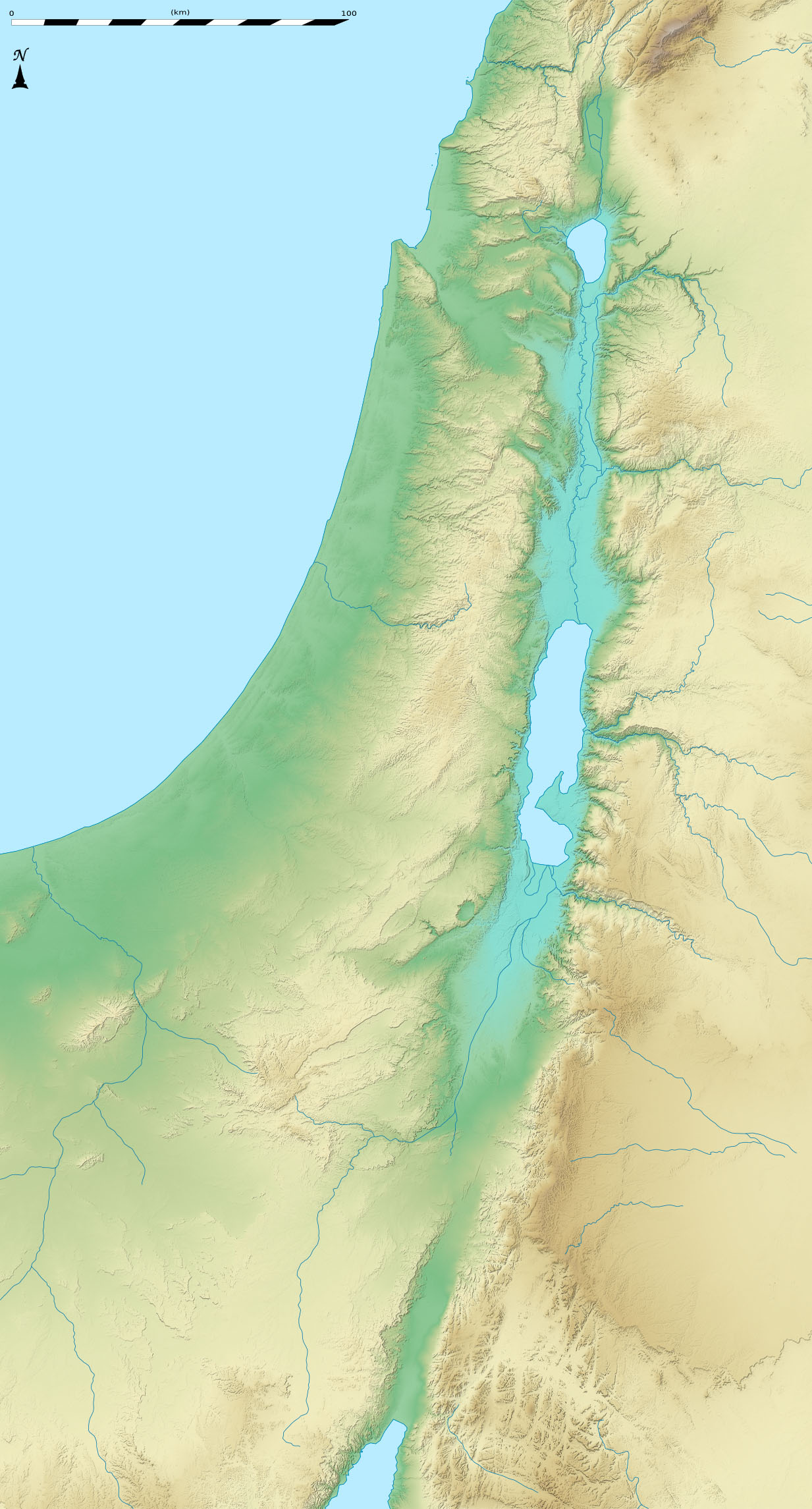
Places mentioned (blue) and alluded (black) in this chapter.

This chapter mentions or alludes to the following places (in order of appearance):

- Ramoth-Gilead
- Jezreel
- Megiddo
- Jerusalem

== Analysis ==
This chapter and the next one contain one continuous narrative of Jehu's overthrow of the Omride dynasty and destruction of the Baal worship in Israel, reopening the battle against apostasy which was started by Elijah (1 Kings 18). Fulfilling the divine commission given to Elijah, Elisha arranged the anointing of Jehu who then executed a total revolution in Israel and Judah, by killing the reigning kings (and their family members) of both kingdoms. The narrative may be divided into two parallel sections, the first one about the assassination of the leaders (including Jezebel, the queen mother of Israel) in chapter 9 and the second about the killing of their kinsmen (including the Baal worshippers as Jezebel's "kin"), ending with a summary of Jehu's reign and the consequences of his action in relation to his faithfulness to YHWH in chapter 10. The structure can be as follows: (Note: This structure is from Francisco O. Garcia-Treto, "The Fall of the House: A Carnivalesque Reading of 2 Kings 9 and 10," Journal for the Study of the Old Testament 46 (1990) 54; apud Cohn 2000, p. 65.)

A Jehu is anointed king (9:1-15)

B Jehu kills King Jehoram outside Jezreel (9:16-26)
C Jehu kills King Ahaziah in Beth-haggan (9:27-29)
D Jehu has Jezebel killed in Jezreel (9:30-37)

B' Jehu massacres the house of Ahab in Jezreel (10:1-11)
C' Jehu massacres the kinsmen of King Ahaziah at Beth-eked (10:12-14)
D' Jehu massacres worshipers of Baal and destroys house of Baal in Samaria (10:15-28)

A' Summary of reign of Jehu (10:29-36)

== The anointing of Jehu (9:1–15) ==
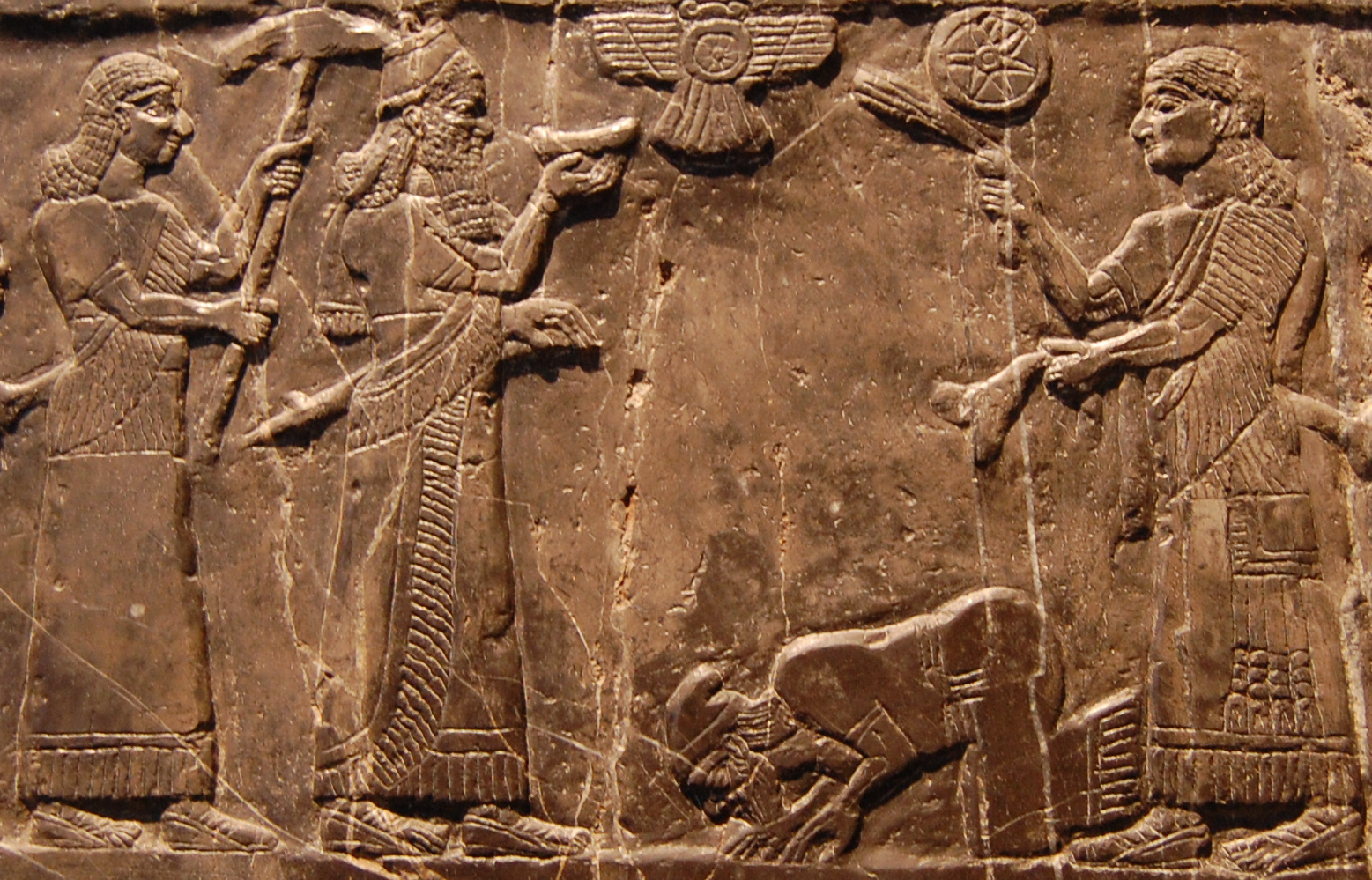
In a scene from the Black Obelisk Jehu bows before Shalmaneser III. This is "the only portrayal we have in ancient Near Eastern art of an Israelite or Judaean monarch".

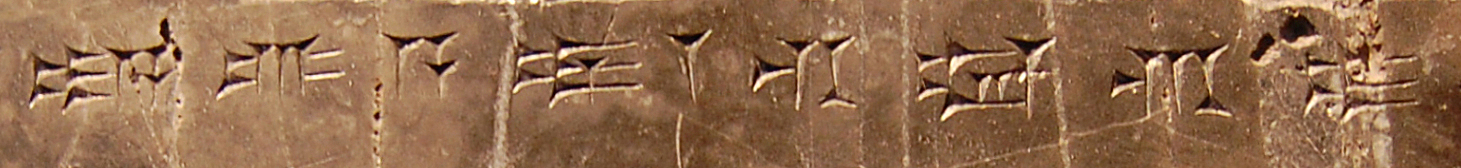
The inscription ^{m}Ia-ú-a mar ^{m}Hu-um-ri-i (Akkadian: 𒅀𒌑𒀀 𒈥 𒄷𒌝𒊑𒄿): "Jehu of the land of people of Omri)".

The inverted subject-verb order in verse 1 indicates the shift to another story line. The political influence of prophets is shown here as in the previous chapter (8:7–15) when Elisha played a role in Hazael's coup d'état against Ben-hadad in Aram-Damascus. In this part Elisha uses a military crisis to fulfill the last divine commission in 1 Kings 19:15–17 to support Jehu's ousting of the Omrides. The long oracle in verses 7–10 stems from Elijah's prophecy to Ahab at Naboth's vineyard in Jezreel (1 Kings 21:21–23).

=== Verses 1–3 ===
^{1}And Elisha the prophet called one of the sons of the prophets, and said to him, "Get yourself ready, take this flask of oil in your hand, and go to Ramoth Gilead. ^{2}Now when you arrive at that place, look there for Jehu the son of Jehoshaphat, the son of Nimshi, and go in and make him rise up from among his associates, and take him to an inner room. ^{3}Then take the flask of oil, and pour it on his head, and say, 'Thus says the Lord: "I have anointed you king over Israel."' Then open the door and flee, and do not delay."

- "Get yourself ready": lit. in Hebrew "Gird up your loins". Elisha gave specific instructions to his disciples, detailing what to bring, what to do, what to say, with the emphasis to separate Jehu from his fellow soldiers outside and to take him to 'an inside room' for the anointing and commissioning, then charging the disciple upon the completion of the tasks to "open the door and flee and don't wait around".

== Jehu kills King Jehoram of Israel (9:16–26) ==
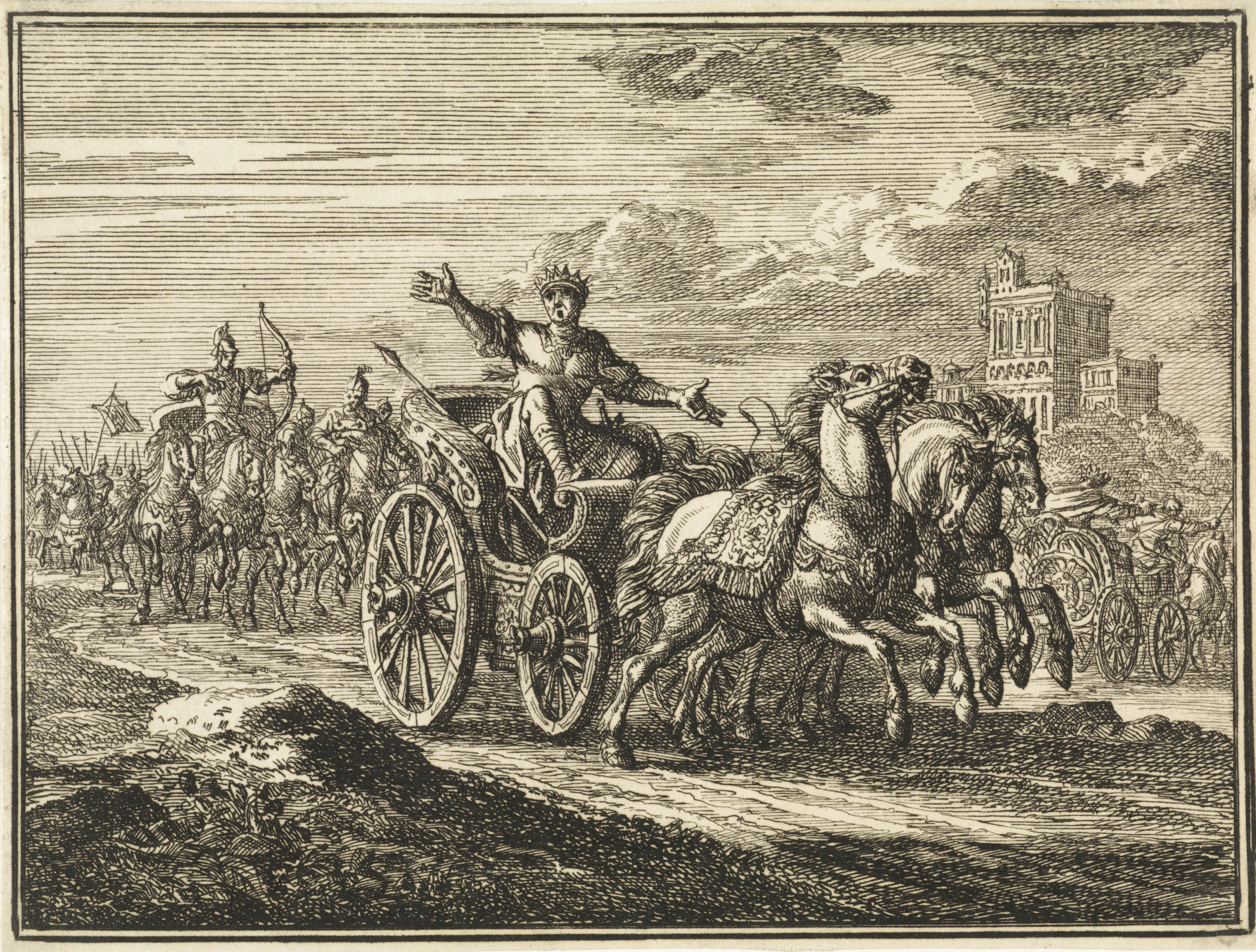
Jehu shoots an arrow that strikes Jehoram in the back. Illustration by Jan Luyken (1712).

The narrative follows an impressive scene from the sentinel's viewpoint (Greek: teichoskopia), detailing how Jehu steers his chariot ('like a maniac') in verses 17–20. Since no messengers he sent to Jehu came back (instead, they got behind Jehu), King Joram decides to investigate the matter himself and meet Jehu halfway (verse 21). Jehu's reply with sharp criticism of the Omrides' religious policy (verse 22) alerts Joram of Jehu's aggressive intentions, but it is too late to flee. With only enough time to warn Ahaziah to run, Joram is killed by Jehu's arrow because, according to Jehu's reason, "Joram had to suffer for a sin committed by his father Ahab" (verses 25, 26a). The discrepancies with 1 Kings 21 (which only mention Naboth, but here also his sons) and the addition of religious dimension in verse 22 suggest the originality of the passage in the context.

=== Verse 20 ===
So the watchman reported, saying, "He went up to them and is not coming back; and the driving is like the driving of Jehu the son of Nimshi, for he drives furiously!"

The man's "crazy" driving style as the chariot was approaching identifies the driver as Jehu. The Hebrew word for "crazy" here (shiggaon) is of the same root word as the nickname "crazy man" (meshugga) associated to the disciple who anointed Jehu in verse 11.

=== Verse 23 ===
And Joram turned his hands, and fled, and said to Ahaziah, There is treachery, O Ahaziah.

- "Turned his hands": refers to how someone would have pulled on the reins in order to make the horses turn around. The switch to inverted subject-verb order emphasizes the simultaneity of Jehoram's attempt to flee and Jehu's taking aim to shoot him with an arrow as the forensic-style report also points the exact path the arrow took to hit Joram.

=== Verse 26 ===
"'Surely I saw yesterday the blood of Naboth and the blood of his sons,' says the Lord, 'and I will repay you in this plot,' says the Lord. Now therefore, take and throw him on the plot of ground, according to the word of the Lord."

- "In this plot": or "on this property".

After the assassination of Jehoram, Jehu provides a brief flashback that he and Bidkar directly heard the original pronouncement of the oracle against Ahab to avenge the death of Naboth (cf. 1 Kings 21:20–24). This information sheds new light that Jehu accepted the oracle after his anointing without question because he had heard it before, thus fueling his conspiracy by the doubled divine word and justifying the slaying of the son of Ahab as recompense for the murder of the sons of Naboth. The pronouncement is framed by his order to Bidkar to throw Joram into the field of Naboth, fulfilling the prophecy.

== Jehu kills King Ahaziah of Judah (9:27–29) ==
Ahaziah the king of Judah initially managed to flee to the south, but was overtaken after about 10 km on the ascent to the mountains and fatally shot. He managed to reach Megiddo, and died there (cf. Josiah in 2 Kings 23:30), then was taken to Jerusalem by his followers.

=== Verse 29 ===
And in the eleventh year of Joram the son of Ahab began Ahaziah to reign over Judah.

- "In the eleventh year of Joram the son of Ahab": Thiele calculates that Ahaziah the son of Jehoram of Judah 'began to reign' as "co-regent" with his father in the month of Tishri (September) 842 BCE, and later became a sole king of Judah after his father's death ("the 12th year of Joram the son of Ahab"; 2 Kings 8:25) between April and September 841 BCE. The mention of "11th year" and "12th year" gives the initial clue to Thiele on how to unravel the chronology of the Hebrew kings.

== Jehu has Jezebel killed (9:30–37) ==
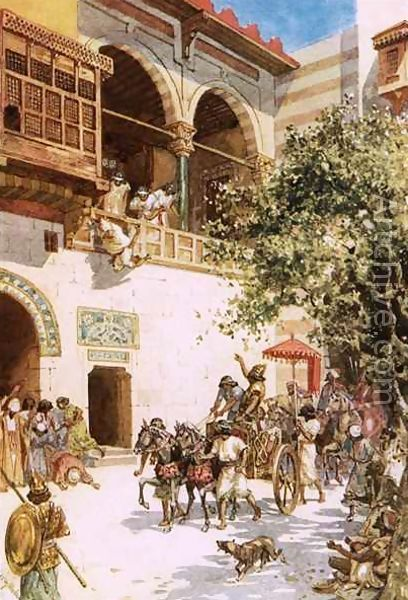
"The death of Jezebel" by William Brassey Hole (1846-1917).

With the death of both kings, Jehu can turn his attention to Jezebel, who is still in Jezreel. He encounters no resistance on entering the city, finding Jezebel, lavishly decorated, appearing at 'the window from which royalty show themselves to the people'. She addresses the approaching Jehu as "Zimri", recalling another usurper who assassinated his royal master, only soon to be overcome himself by Omri (cf. 1 Kings 16:8–20). Jehu responds impatiently and orders the queen mother to be thrown out of the window. After it was promptly executed, Jehu imperturbably went in to eat, then, as an afterthought, he remembered that noble people should be given a decent burial, but there is not enough left of Jezebel to bury (verses 30–35). Verses 33–37 refer to the judgement made in 1 Kings 21:23 to legitimize the events.

=== Verse 31 ===
And as Jehu entered in at the gate, she said, Had Zimri peace, who slew his master?

Jezebel associates Jehu with another assassin, Zimri, who approximately 44 years before had murdered King Elah, only to meet a violent death just a few days later (1 Kings 16:9–20).

== Other ==
Elijah is mentioned in verse 36. Elijah reportedly predicted that Jezebel's flesh would be eaten by dogs.

== See also ==
- Jezreel
- Tel Megiddo
- Ramoth-Gilead
- Samaria
- Related Bible parts:2 Kings 2, 2 Kings 4

== Sources ==
- Cohn, Robert L. (2000). Cotter, David W.; Walsh, Jerome T.; Franke, Chris (eds.). 2 Kings. Berit Olam (The Everlasting Covenant): Studies In Hebrew Narrative And Poetry. Liturgical Press. ISBN 9780814650547.
- Collins, John J. (2014). "Chapter 14: 1 Kings 12 – 2 Kings 25". Introduction to the Hebrew Scriptures. Fortress Press. pp. 277–296. ISBN 9781451469233.
- Coogan, Michael David (2007). Coogan, Michael David; Brettler, Marc Zvi; Newsom, Carol Ann; Perkins, Pheme (eds.). The New Oxford Annotated Bible with the Apocryphal/Deuterocanonical Books: New Revised Standard Version, Issue 48 (Augmented 3rd ed.). Oxford University Press. ISBN 9780195288810.
- Dietrich, Walter (2007). "13. 1 and 2 Kings". In Barton, John; Muddiman, John (eds.). The Oxford Bible Commentary (first (paperback) ed.). Oxford University Press. pp. 232–266. ISBN 978-0199277186.
- Halley, Henry H. (1965). Halley's Bible Handbook: an abbreviated Bible commentary (24th (revised) ed.). Zondervan Publishing House. ISBN 0-310-25720-4.
- Leithart, Peter J. (2006). 1 & 2 Kings. Brazos Theological Commentary on the Bible. Brazos Press. ISBN 978-1587431258.
- McFall, Leslie (1991), "Translation Guide to the Chronological Data in Kings and Chronicles" (PDF), Bibliotheca Sacra, 148: 3-45, archived from the original (PDF) on 2010-08-27
- McKane, William (1993). "Kings, Book of". In Metzger, Bruce M; Coogan, Michael D (eds.). The Oxford Companion to the Bible. Oxford University Press. pp. 409–413. ISBN 978-0195046458.
- Thiele, Edwin R. (1983). The Mysterious Numbers of the Hebrew Kings (3rd ed.). Grand Rapids, Michigan: Zondervan. ISBN 978-0-310-36010-0.
- Würthwein, Ernst (1995). The Text of the Old Testament. Translated by Rhodes, Erroll F. Grand Rapids, MI: Wm. B. Eerdmans. ISBN 0-8028-0788-7.
