= 1 Kings 21 =

1 Kings, chapter 21

- ← chapter 20 chapter 22 →
- The pages containing the Books of Kings (1 & 2 Kings) Leningrad Codex (1008 CE).
- Book: First book of Kings
- Hebrew Bible part: Nevi'im
- Order in the Hebrew part: 4
- Category: Former Prophets
- Christian Bible part: Old Testament
- Order in the Christian part: 11

1 Kings 21 is the 21st chapter of the Books of Kings in the Hebrew Bible or the First Book of Kings in the Old Testament of the Christian Bible. The book is a compilation of various annals recording the acts of the kings of Israel and Judah by a Deuteronomic compiler in the seventh century BCE, with a supplement added in the sixth century BCE. This chapter belongs to the section comprising 1 Kings 16:15 to 2 Kings 8:29 which documents the period of the Omrides. The focus of this chapter is the reign of king Ahab in the northern kingdom, specifically where Ahab selfishly desires a vineyard nearby his palace in Jezreel owned by a neighbor named Naboth, the king tries to buy the vineyard from Naboth, but Naboth refused, Ahab was so upset and depressed that Jezebel decided to get him the vineyard to make him happy by making a conspiracy against Naboth and have him assassinated. After Naboth was executed, Jezebel told Ahab he could have the vineyard, but when he enters the vineyard, Elijah arrives to deliver a grim prophecy that his dynasty was doomed, dogs would lick the king's blood (which was later fulfilled in the next chapter), his queen would be eaten by dogs (fulfilled in 2 Kings 9), any member of Ahab's family who would die in the city would be eaten by dogs, and any member of Ahab's family who would die in the countryside would be eaten by birds (this is the exact verbatim prophecy Ahijah made against Jeroboam's dynasty in 1 Kings 14 and that Jehu made against Baasha's dynasty in 1 Kings 16).

== Text ==
This chapter was originally written in the Hebrew language and since the 16th century is divided into 29 verses.

=== Textual witnesses ===
Some early manuscripts containing the text of this chapter in Hebrew are of the Masoretic Text tradition, which includes the Codex Cairensis (895), Aleppo Codex (10th century), and Codex Leningradensis (1008).

There is also a translation into Koine Greek known as the Septuagint, made in the last few centuries BCE. Extant ancient manuscripts of the Septuagint version include Codex Vaticanus (B; $\mathfrak{G}$^{B}; 4th century) and Codex Alexandrinus (A; $\mathfrak{G}$^{A}; 5th century). (Note: The whole book of 1 Kings is missing from the extant Codex Sinaiticus.)

== Ahab's and Jezebel's judicial murder of Naboth (21:1–16) ==
In ancient Israel the farming families (comprising over 90% of the population) were legally protected of landownership (Leviticus 25; Deuteronomy 5:21), so they have a secure economic existence and thus firm citizen's rights by the allocation of sufficient land. The farmer Naboth had thus the right as well as the duty to bequeath his land to his family and not to outsiders, to inhibit the alienation of family property (e.g., Leviticus 25:8–34; Numbers 27:9–11). King Ahab was to abide to this rule, but this passage shows 'how unscrupulously the king's power over the civilian rights could still be used and how compliant the lay assessors' court was to his wishes', especially when it was driven by a queen originated from abroad (Jezebel was from Sidon, Phoenicia) and did not respect (or understand) Israelite ethics. In any case, the scandal of Naboth was still an individual case, whereas the theft of land by the ruling class 100 years later would become an economic principle (Isaiah 5:8; Amos 2:6; Micah 2:1-2).

=== Verse 1 ===
And it came to pass after these things that Naboth the Jezreelite had a vineyard which was in Jezreel, next to the palace of Ahab king of Samaria.

- "Vineyard which was in Jezreel": In 2012, the Jezreel Expedition under the direction of Dr. Norma Franklin of the University of Haifa uncovered at the foot of Tel Jezreel a prominent ancient winery that was operating during the ninth-century BCE time of Naboth. It is a 40-square-foot wine-making complex, complete with a large treading floor, deep vats and a basin, located below a large building related to some kind of military use, also dated roughly to the ninth century BCE. The large building matches the definition of hekhal (הֵיכַ֣ל, translated in this verse as "palace") which refers to a “large, important building, possibly of a military or religious nature”—not necessarily a palace. It is suggested that this ancient winery could be Naboth's vineyard, which was located next to Ahab's "palace" in Jezreel.

== Elijah's judgement against Ahab and his court (21:17–29) ==
The evil act towards Naboth required someone to confront the king and under such circumstances this was normally a prophet, such as Elijah who suddenly stood before king Ahab in the vineyards of Naboth. After briefly listening to Ahab's surprised question (verse 20: 'Have you found me, O my enemy?'), Elijah firmly threw his accusation (verse 19: 'Have you killed, and also taken possession?'), and immediately announced the judgement (verse 19: 'In the place where dogs licked the blood of Naboth, dogs will also lick up your blood'). Elijah must have scolded Ahab in a lengthy speech (verses 20b–22, 24, closely related to the speeches in 1 Kings 14:7–11 and 2 Kings 9:7–10) repeating the king's religious failings (verses 25–26). Ahab's response as a repentant sinner postponed his judgement to the next generation (verses 27–29). The reference in 2 Kings 9:36–37 ascertains the fulfilment of the prophecy. A parallel rendering of this story can be found in 2 Kings 9:25–26.

== See also ==
- Amorites
- Baasha
- Belial
- Fasting
- Idolatry
- Israel
- Jezreel
- Prophet
- Samaria
- Stoning
- Related Bible parts: Leviticus 25; Deuteronomy 5, 1 Kings 14, 1 Kings 15, 1 Kings 16, 2 Kings 9, Isaiah 5; Amos 2; Micah 2

== Sources ==
- Collins, John J. (2014). "Chapter 14: 1 Kings 12 – 2 Kings 25". Introduction to the Hebrew Scriptures. Fortress Press. pp. 277–296. ISBN 978-1451469233.
- Coogan, Michael David (2007). Coogan, Michael David; Brettler, Marc Zvi; Newsom, Carol Ann; Perkins, Pheme (eds.). The New Oxford Annotated Bible with the Apocryphal/Deuterocanonical Books: New Revised Standard Version, Issue 48 (Augmented 3rd ed.). Oxford University Press. ISBN 978-0195288810.
- Dietrich, Walter (2007). "13. 1 and 2 Kings". In Barton, John; Muddiman, John (eds.). The Oxford Bible Commentary (first (paperback) ed.). Oxford University Press. pp. 232–266. ISBN 978-0199277186.
- Halley, Henry H. (1965). Halley's Bible Handbook: an abbreviated Bible commentary (24th (revised) ed.). Zondervan Publishing House. ISBN 0-310-25720-4.
- Hayes, Christine (2015). Introduction to the Bible. Yale University Press. ISBN 978-0300188271.
- Leithart, Peter J. (2006). 1 & 2 Kings. Brazos Theological Commentary on the Bible. Brazos Press. ISBN 978-1587431258.
- McKane, William (1993). "Kings, Book of". In Metzger, Bruce M; Coogan, Michael D (eds.). The Oxford Companion to the Bible. Oxford University Press. pp. 409–413. ISBN 978-0195046458.
- Metzger, Bruce M; Coogan, Michael D, eds. (1993). The Oxford Companion to the Bible. Oxford University Press. ISBN 978-0195046458.
- Würthwein, Ernst (1995). The Text of the Old Testament. Translated by Rhodes, Erroll F. Grand Rapids, MI: Wm. B. Eerdmans. ISBN 0-8028-0788-7.
