= List of one-eyed creatures in mythology and fiction =

There are many creatures in the mythology, folklore, and fiction of many cultures who are one-eyed; this page lists such one-eyed creatures.

== In mythology, folklore and religion ==
- Arimaspi, legendary people of northern Scythia, "always at war with their neighbours" and stealing gold from griffins. They had a single eye in the centre of the forehead.
- Balor, a giant in Irish mythology, with one eye in his forehead that would wreak destruction when opened
- Bungisngis, one-eyed giants of Philippine folklore
- Cyclopes (singular: Cyclops), one-eyed giants in Greek mythology, including Polyphemus. They had a single eye in the centre of their forehead.
  - Polyphemus, a giant Cyclops shepherd in Greek mythology
  - Arges, one of the three Cyclops smith gods in Greek mythology
  - Brontes, one of the three Cyclops smith gods in Greek mythology
  - Steropes, one of the three Cyclops smith gods in Greek mythology
- Dajjal, a figure in Islam akin to the Antichrist, who has one functional eye
- Duwa Sokhor, an ancestor of Genghis Khan, according to the Secret History of the Mongols, who had one eye in his forehead
- Fachan, a creature from Celtic mythology with one eye, one arm and one leg
- The Eye of Providence is a representation of Divine Providence
- The Graeae, the three witches (or sisters) that shared one eye and one tooth between them; often depicted as clairvoyant. They were forced by Perseus, by stealing their eye, into revealing the location of Medusa.
- Hagen or Högni, a Burgundian warrior in German and Norse legend, depicted as one-eyed in some accounts
- Some yōkais, supernatural entities in the Japanese folklore, have a single giant eye:
  - Hitotsume-kozō, monsters (obake) in Japanese folklore, with a single giant eye in the center of the face
  - Hitotsume-nyūdō could pass for really tall human priests if not for the large, single eye in the center of their faces.
  - Kasa-obake, one-eyed sentient umbrella yōkai of Japanese folklore
  - Shirime
  - Yamawaro
- Jian, a bird in Chinese mythology with only one eye and one wing. A pair of such birds were dependent on each other and inseparable.
- Kabandha, a demon with no head or neck with one large eye on the breast and a mouth on the stomach. Kabandha appears in Hindu mythology as a character in the Ramayana.
- Likho, an embodiment of evil fate and misfortune in Slavic mythology
- Mapinguari, giant sloth-like cryptid of Brazil and Bolivia often described as having one eye
- Odin, a Norse god (he was born with two eyes, but traded one for a drink from Mimir's well)
- Ojáncanu, one-eyed giant with a ten-fingered hand, a ten-toed foot, a long beard and red hair of Cantabrian mythology who embodies evil, cruelty and brutality
- One-Eye
  - One of three sisters in the Brothers Grimm fairy tale One-Eye, Two-Eyes, and Three-Eyes
  - A one-eyed giant in a story from Georgia, in the Caucasus, whose story parallels the story of Polyphemus (see Polyphemus#Possible origins)
- Papinijuwari, Australian sky deities with vampiric tendencies
- Popobawa, a Tanzanian shetani (evil spirit) that often takes the form of a one-eyed bat-like creature
- Psoglav, a one-eyed dog-headed monster in Serbian mythology
- Snallygaster, a one-eyed dragon-like creature said to inhabit the hills surrounding Washington, D.C. and Frederick County, Maryland
- Tepegoz, a one-eyed ogre in the Oghuz Turkish epic Book of Dede Korkut

== In fiction ==
=== Science fiction ===
- Alpha Centauri, a green hermaphrodite hexapod with one huge eye; Doctor Who character first seen in The Curse of Peladon
- Cylon Centurions in sci-fi franchise Battlestar Galactica
- The Cyclops (1957), a science fiction horror film about a creature created via radiation exposure
- Dalek Sec, a monster that became a one-eyed Dalek-human hybrid in Doctor Who
- Gigan from the Godzilla series, a one-eyed alien cyborg Kaiju
- Kerack, an alien race resembling large one-eyed prawns in the novel Camelot 30K
- Magnus the Red, the one-eyed primarch of the Thousand Sons legion in Warhammer 40,000
- Monoids, an alien race in the 1966 Doctor Who serial The Ark
- Myo and other Abyssin aliens in Star Wars
- Naga and his tribe of one-eyed violent mutants in the 1956 movie World Without End
- Old One Eye, a unique Tyranid carnifex with the ability to rapidly regenerate from mortal wounds in Warhammer 40k
- One-eyed, starfish-shaped aliens from the planet Paira in the 1956 Japanese film Warning from Space
- Ravage, a panther-like Decepticon in Transformers: Revenge of the Fallen
- Scaroth, last of the Jagaroth, a time-travelling alien in the 1979 Doctor Who story City of Death
- Tralfamadorians, a four-dimensional alien species with heads resembling human hands appearing in multiple Kurt Vonnegut’s novels
- Uniocs, an alien race in the webcomic Schlock Mercenary

=== Comic books ===
- Allen the Alien, a heroical individual of a cyclops-like alien species “Unopan” from the comics and TV series Invincible
- Basilisk, a large one-eyed mutant in Marvel Comics' New X-Men
- Orb (comics), a Marvel Comics super-villain, primarily an adversary of Ghost Rider
- Shuma-Gorath (or Shuma Gorath), a giant eye with tentacles in the Marvel comics universe, first appearance in Marvel Premiere #10 September 1973
- Starro the Conqueror, a supervillain in DC Comics, a starfish-like creature who first appeared in 1960
- Garagantos in Marvel Comics, first appearance in Sub-Mariner (1968–1974) issue #13

=== Historical and mythological fantasy ===
- Beholder, a creature in the role-playing game Dungeons & Dragons with one large eye and many smaller eyestalks
- The 7th Voyage of Sinbad, bipedal cyclops giants appear in this 1958 American fantasy film
- Cyclops in the role-playing game Dungeons & Dragons
- Draken, a one-eyed sea monster in the animated series Jumanji
- Imbra, an idol and the highest god of Kafiristan in Rudyard Kipling's The Man Who Would Be King
- Medusa in the Italian film Medusa Against the Son of Hercules, adapted for television as one episode of the series The Sons of Hercules
- Ulysses Polyphemus appears in this 1954 Italian epic based on Greek myth
- Rell, a cyclops in the film Krull. The Cyclops traded with the Beast one of their eyes for the ability to see into the future. The Beast did give them the ability to see into the future – but they can only see the moment of their own deaths.
- Sauron, the eponymous arch-villain of The Lord of the Rings, often depicted as looking through a single 'Eye' in Peter Jackson's cinematic adaptations of Tolkien's work
- Tyson, Percy Jackson's half-brother in Percy Jackson & the Olympians, is a Cyclops. Cyclopes also appear as villains.
- Zargon, a giant one-eyed monster in the role-playing game Dungeons & Dragons

=== Animation and puppetry ===
- Ahgg, the witches' giant spider with one eye in the center of his forehead in My Little Pony: The Movie
- Several alien characters in the Ben 10 franchise have one eye, including Ben's alien transformations Upgrade, Wildvine, Chromastone, and Feedback.
- Bill Cipher, an evil yellow eye of providence-like entity in Gravity Falls
- Big Billy in The Powerpuff Girls who showed that he had one eye in the episode "School House Rocked"
- B.O.B. (Bicarbonate Ostylezene Benzoate), a gelatinous creature in Monsters vs. Aliens
- The Centaur Monster with a body of a centaur in TMNT (2007)
- Iris in the animated series Ruby Gloom
- Horvak, Krumm's father from Aaahh!!! Real Monsters
- Kang and Kodos, a recurring alien duo in the animated series The Simpsons
- Leela, a mutant character, as well as her parents Munda and Morris, in the animated series Futurama. One episode also features the "Cyclopophage" - a one-eyed monster that only eats other one-eyed creatures (including the robot Bender, after one of his two eyes falls out).
- Some of the Minions, comic henchmen in the Despicable Me franchise
- Muno, a tall, red monster with one large eye, in the children's television series Yo Gabba Gabba!
- Sheldon Plankton in the animated children's series SpongeBob SquarePants
- Agent Pleakley in the 2002 animated film Lilo & Stitch
- Sapphire in the Cartoon Network animated series Steven Universe
- Mike Wazowski in the Monsters, Inc. franchise has a spherical body with one eye.
- Zatar the Alien, a green alien in the MTV series Celebrity Deathmatch
- Tri-Klops, a henchman of the villain Skeletor in the children's show He-Man and the Masters of the Universe
- Rob, an anthropomorph cyclops boy in the animated show The Amazing World of Gumball
- Kyle, the owner of the Queen's Goiter, and Cloppy, Evan's one-eyed monster doll from The Barbarian and the Troll

==== Anime and manga ====
- Lord Boros, in One-Punch Man, the alien leader of the Dark Matter Thieves, self-proclaimed subjugator of the universe, and the first antagonist to give Saitama a "serious fight"
- Norman Burg, the butler and weapons specialist to Roger Smith in The Big O
- Darklops Zero, prototype of Darklops in the film Ultraman Zero: The Revenge of Belial
- Iwanaga Kotoko, in In/Spectre, A 17-year-old goddess of wisdom to the spirits and humans alike, has only one eye and one leg due to sacrificing a part of her to become a goddess.
- Manako, a cyclops sniper in Monster Musume
- Hitomi Manaka, cyclops school nurse and protagonist of Nurse Hitomi's Monster Infirmary
- Mannequin soldiers, lesser homunculi created by a government project in Fullmetal Alchemist
- Ode, a yellow kind cyclops in Chiikawa

=== Video games ===
- The beholster (a direct reference to the beholder from Dungeons & Dragons) in Enter the Gungeon
- Ahriman, a species of monster from the Japanese role-playing game series Final Fantasy
- Bongo Bongo, Gohma, Hinox, and the boss form of Vaati in the Legend of Zelda game series
- The Cacodemon and Pain Elemental from id software's computer game DOOM
- The Cyclops and other various monsters in the popular Japanese role-playing game series Dragon Quest
- Dimitri Alexandre Blaiddyd from Fire Emblem: Three Houses
- Drethdock from the Sega Saturn game Battle Monsters
- The ghost Pokémon Duskull, Dusclops, and Dusknoir
- Eggplant Wizard, an enemy in Nintendo's Kid Icarus
- Evil Eye, a monster in the online RPG MapleStory
- Fuyuhiko Kuzuryu, the ultimate yakuza from Danganronpa 2: Goodbye Despair.
- Myukus a giant blue-green Alien with one eye in Rampage 2: Universal Tour
- Suezo, a one-eyed, one-footed breed of monster in the video game/anime series Monster Rancher
- Waddle Doo in Nintendo's game franchise Kirby

=== Music ===
- Purple People Eater in the 1958 novelty song of the same name
- Sgt. Psyclopps, the one-eyed guitarist for the costumed comedy punk band The Radioactive Chicken Heads
- "Cyclops", a song from Portrait of an American Family by Marilyn Manson
- Wotan/Wandrer in The Ring of the Nibelung, a Germanic variant of Odin in Wagner's cycle of four music-dramas
- Black Shuck - a one-eyed demon dog in the song Black Shuck, by rock band The Darkness from their debut album Permission to Land.

=== Other ===
- The Wicked Witch of the West from L. Frank Baum's The Wonderful Wizard of Oz; also other queens and witches in Oz such as Blinkie (The Scarecrow of Oz) and Marcia (The Yellow Knight of Oz).
- Wenlock and Mandeville, London 2012 Olympic mascots.

== See also ==
- List of many-eyed creatures in mythology and fiction
