= Nebiism =

Ancient Nevi'im religious movement

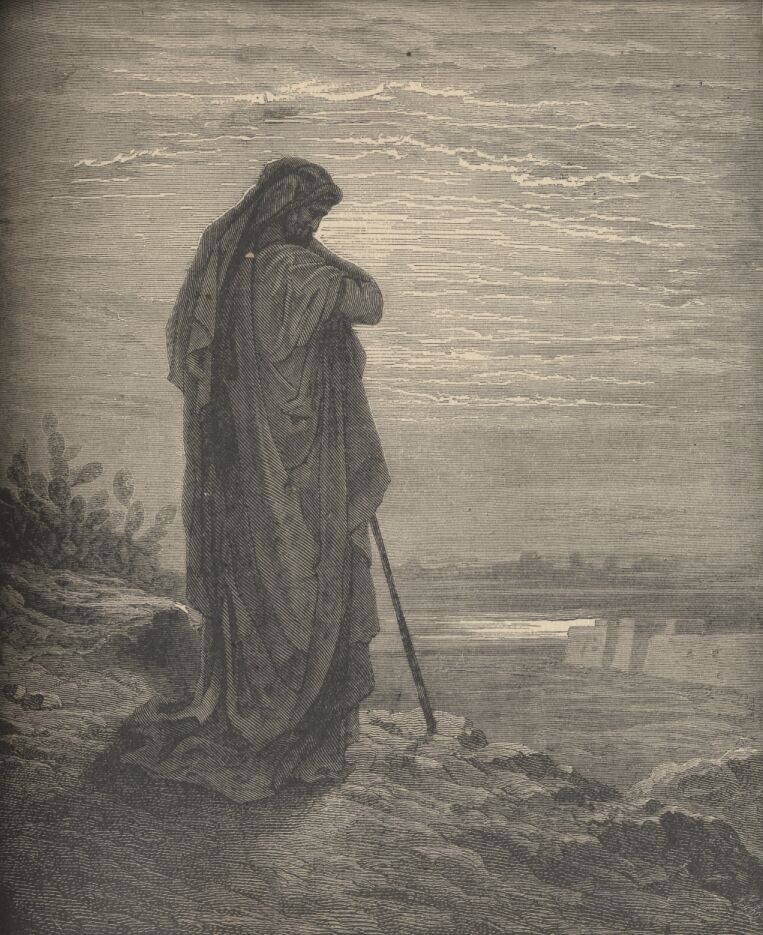
The prophet Amos, according to an engraving by Gustave Doré.

Nebiism was a religious movement within Judaism formed by the Nevi'im (in Hebrew נְבִיאִים) also called "sons or disciples of the prophets" (benê hannebî'îm). It was a special social group within the Israelite people that first appears in the Book of Samuel. Its existence and characteristics have been the subject of controversy in biblical studies, the only available source for understanding its characteristics. They formed communities comparable to primitive forms of religious life, or to ecstatic groups in the style of the cultures of the time, but it is a very particular phenomenon of Yahwist religiosity in Palestine.

== Origin ==
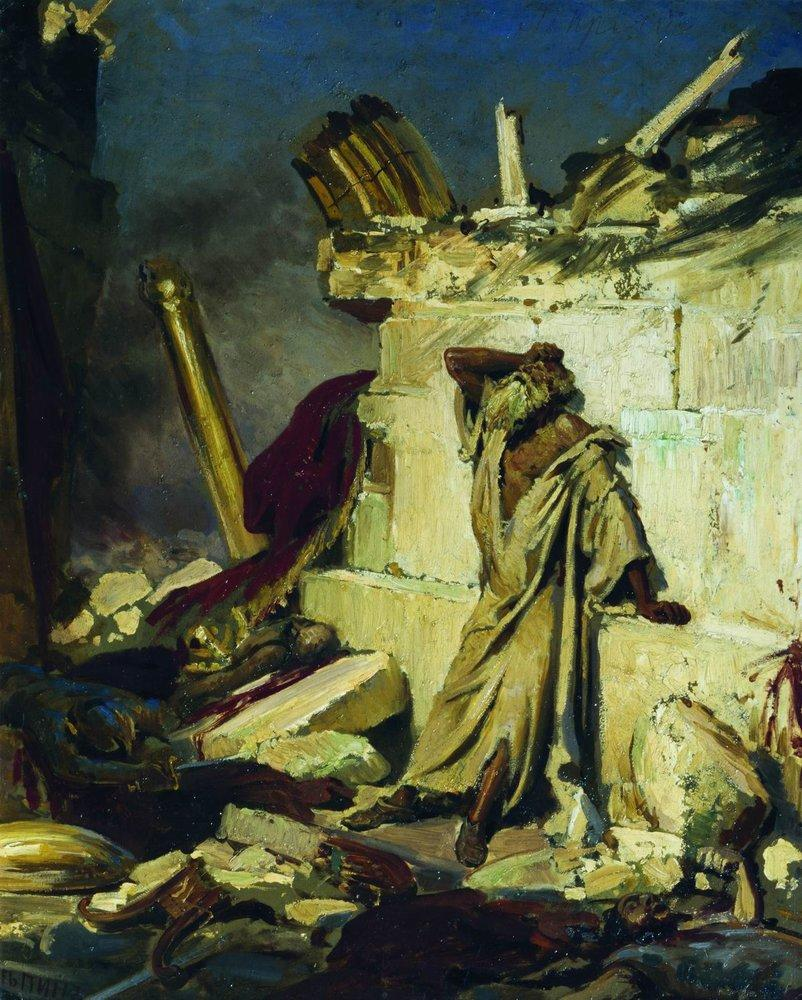
The neb'í were initially an ascetic movement critical of the Israelite monarchy. In the image, Jeremiah before the ruins of Jerusalem, by Ilya Repin, (1870).

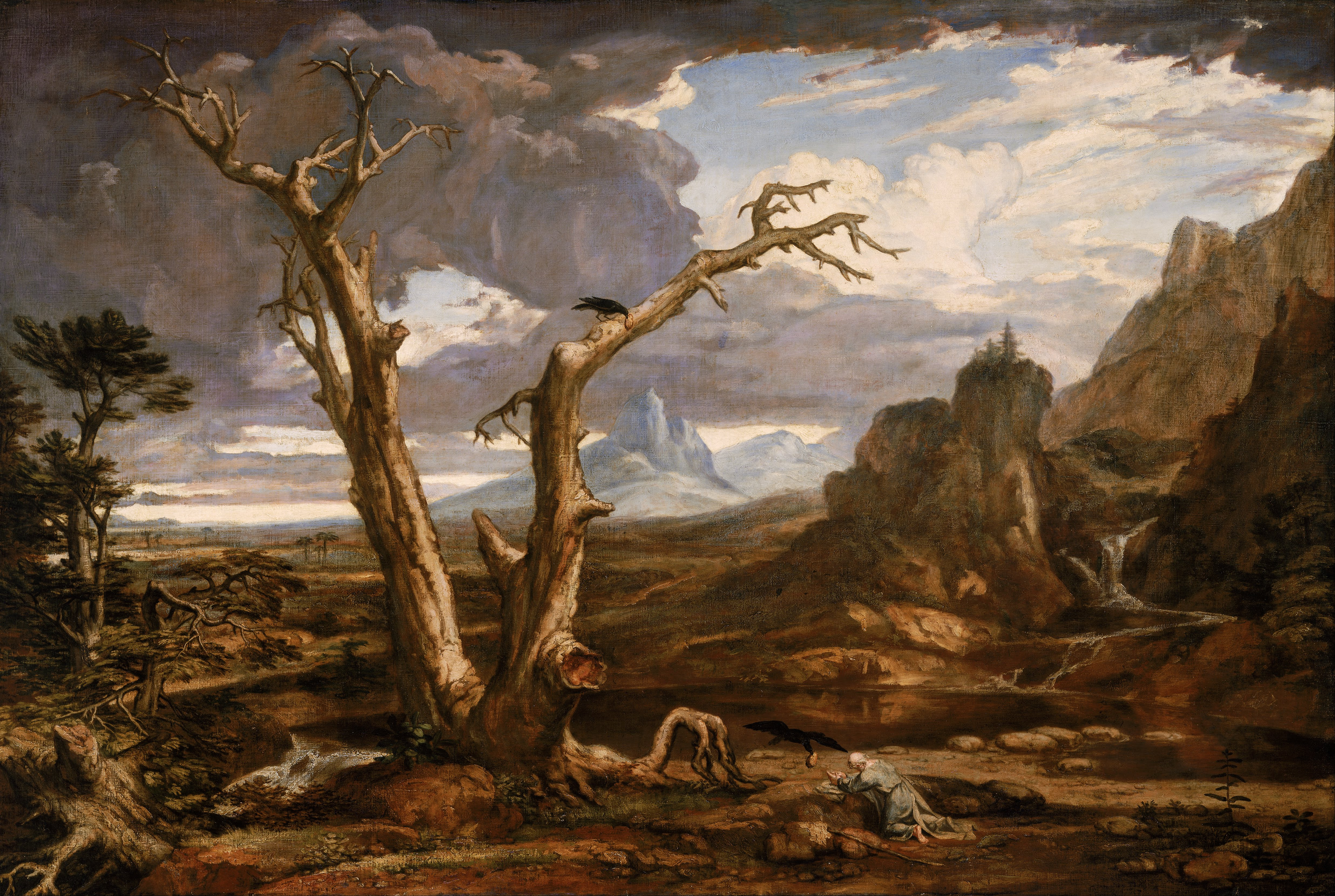
Elijah withdrawn in the desert, by Washington Allston (1818). The memory of the desert experience is a constant in Israelite theology, especially in prophetic literature.

The causes that motivated its birth, according to biblical texts, were the scarcity of prophetic revelations, the attraction of Canaanite cults, and the passivity of Israelite priests.

These causes induced certain Yahwist faithful, belonging to lower social strata, almost marginalized, to gather around a figure considered as "father," with whom they met, at least on occasions.

== Characteristics ==
They formed independent and itinerant communities, in response to a collective charisma, without preventing some prophets from being "called" personally, such as Obadiah of Shiloh, Micaiah ben Imlah, and Elisha.

They were united in poverty, shared their labor, and were sustained by wild products and by public charity as means of subsistence. It seems that most of them had families, but there would have been some celibates.

In the narratives they usually settled in places in the south of the Northern Kingdom, perhaps maintaining a close relationship with local sanctuaries: Ramah, Bethel, Jericho, and Mount Carmel, where they acted as auxiliaries of worship.

They showed great religious enthusiasm through dances and music. These practices must be explained by the character of their charisma, modeled on the cultic rites of the time.

== Later evolution ==
On the occasion of the schism during the syncretism of the reign of Ahab, some communities were divided into followers of Baal, "prophets of Baal," protected by the crown but exterminated by divine command, and guilds faithful to Yahweh, threatened to pay for their fidelity with persecution and death.

After a renaissance under the guidance of Elisha, their decline occurred, led by a languid life. They were harshly criticized for pursuing their own interests and not those of God and merited the reproach of the great prophets of Israel.

== Religiosity ==
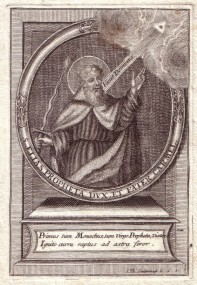
The prophet Elijah, leader of the nebiist movement and prototype of the Jewish prophet.

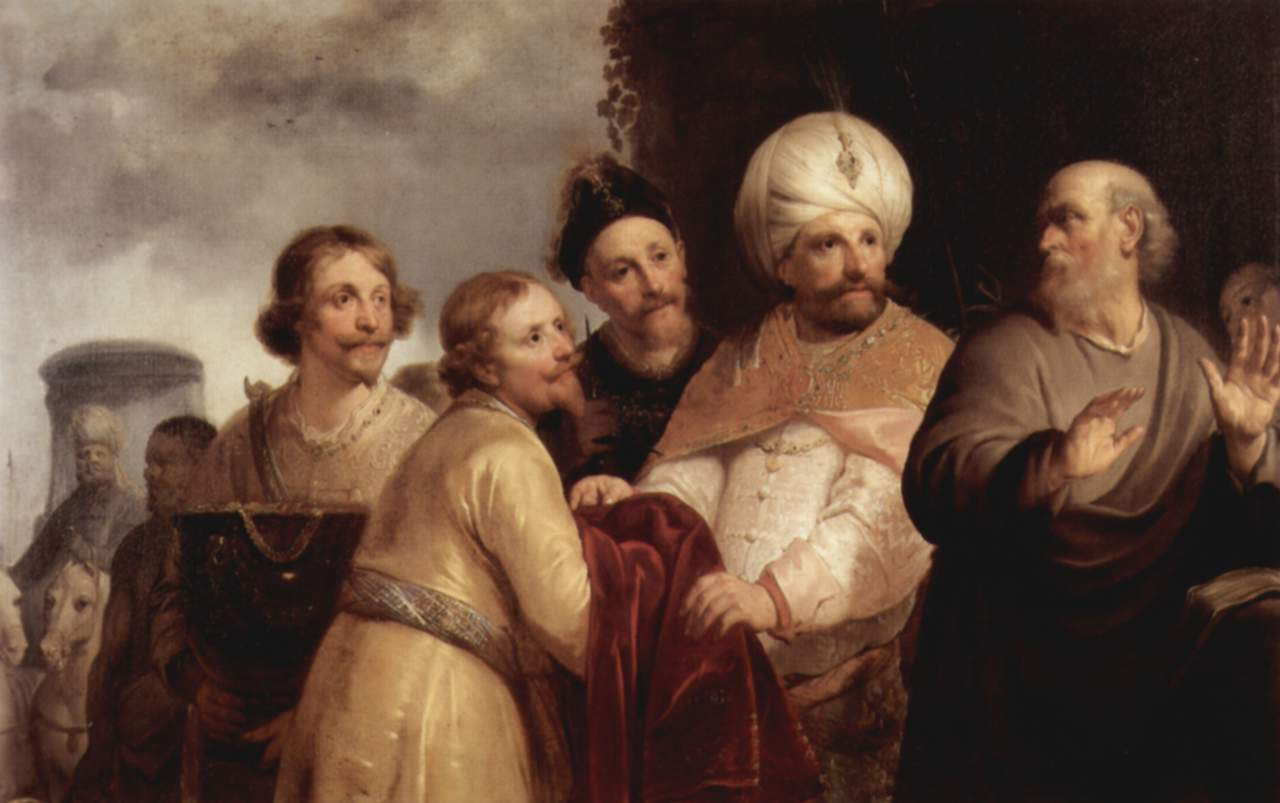
Elisha, leader of the "sons of the prophets," demonstrates his poverty by refusing gifts from Naaman the Syrian, in a painting by Pieter de Grebber (1637).

Exegetes classify this phenomenon as typically religious due to its zeal, itinerancy and extreme poverty, the appearance of the group at critical moments for the experience of Yahwist faith, and the confrontation with the prophets of Baal. They also have a clear social dimension, given their intervention in the fall of the Omride dynasty and the rise of the house of Jehu.

The fundamental characteristics of their religiosity are:

1. Group ecstasy: especially essential in the first prophetic movement. Its origin could be worship, as indicated by their places of residence and, perhaps, the influence of the prophets of Baal. Sacred dance and song are essential in Jewish liturgy from ancient times and continues in many religious traditions, from the dervishes to the dances of Hasidic Judaism. Mystical ecstasy enables giving information in the name of Yahweh, hence the name neb'i, man in whom the word of God resides.
2. Struggle against Canaanite religion: the authentic motive for the union of prophetic groups is to fanatically confront Canaanite influences, although the political and social situation was also involved. In times of strong political oppression, religious feelings that call for a return to the purest tradition tend to radicalize.
3. Announcement and obedience to the will of Yahweh: in a people like Israel, with such a vivid awareness of God's closeness and direct action, the miraculous actions of the prophetic masters (such as Elisha) and the advice extracted from ecstasy are attributed to Yahweh. The prophet never attributes power to himself, but prays to obtain it; he is a tool, a mediator, and a messenger of God.
4. Balance between the desert and the people: in the Elijah cycle there are frequent references to the return to the nomadic and desert ideal of Israel, and the prophets frequently withdrew to Mount Horeb or Carmel. Elisha, for his part, inaugurated a new era closer to the people and places of worship. They participated in the daily concerns of society and had a function of responsibility as spokespersons for the word of Yahweh. Prophecy and history began to unite and influence each other, prefiguring the great prophets of the 8th century BCE.
5. Independence from goods: the external life of the neb'i is also a protest, by the way of dressing, hairy skin and leather belt, by itinerancy and their "escape" from worldly interests: they positioned themselves equidistant from political and cultic power, although they recognized the king, temples, and priests as sacred realities.

What they sought was for Israel to return to its own faith, with exclusive radicality. Their conduct and religious enthusiasm are an affirmation of God, of Yahweh as the only God of Israel. In fact, in union with prophetic leaders, they are the protagonists of Israel's religious life in the difficult crisis that the transition to monarchy and the schism of the kingdoms represented.

With their outbursts of fanaticism, they proclaim that this is the people of Yahweh and that Yahweh is present in the midst of his people. By their very nature, they are an eloquent, fervent testimony of Yahwism.

The biblical scholar Gerhard von Rad thus captures the soul of the prophetic communities:

Perhaps we would not be mistaken if we consider these confraternities of prophets as the last bearers of a pure and unmixed faith in Yahweh, nor would we be mistaken if we highly esteem their importance for the survival of faith in Yahweh, and especially for the characteristic stamp it will have henceforth. Ultimately, this is the point from which that unprecedented radicalization of Yahwist faith and divine law that we encounter in the later prophets departed.

== Decline ==
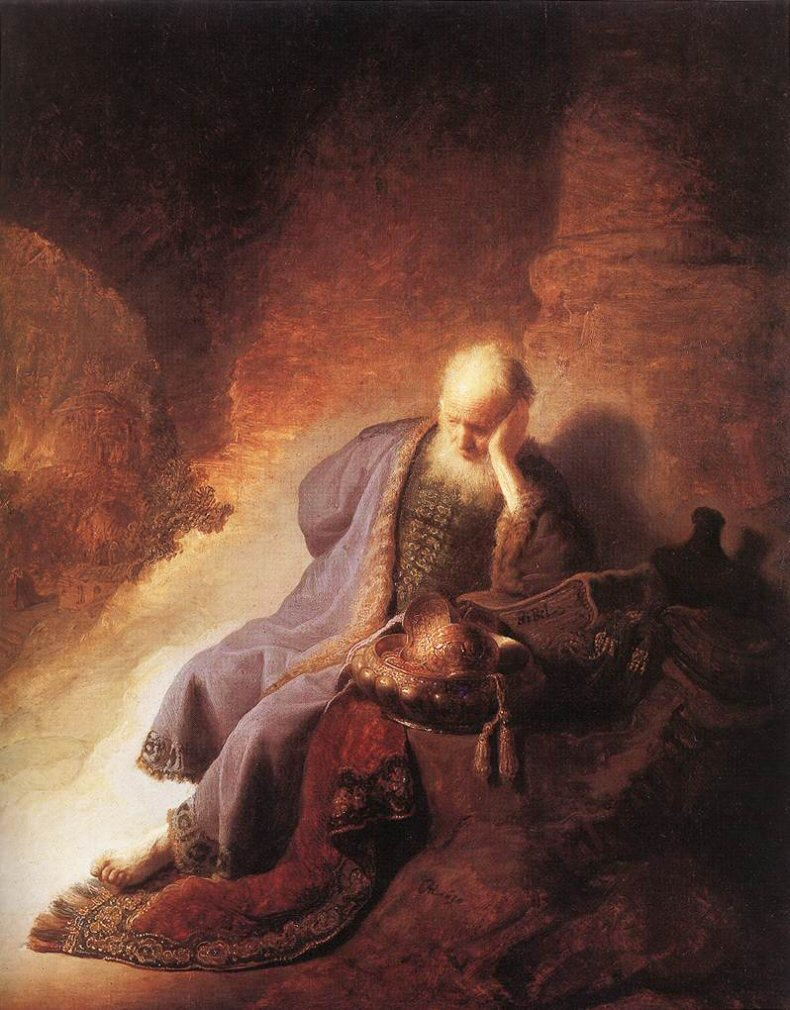
Jeremiah, who was one of the major prophets most critical of the neb'í, laments before the devastation of Jerusalem in a painting by Rembrandt (1630).

Under King David, communities of prophets established themselves in Jerusalem, giving rise to a kind of institution with a prophetic-cultural purpose. In this way, the "sons of the prophets" became a body of "Levite-prophets" there.

Nebiism was a strong movement while it manifested itself in a rising religious nationalist culture, but it degenerated when prophetism was assimilated to royal monarchical prophets or thanks to the influences of Canaanite cults, where violent and exaggerated ecstasies and dream interpretations were much more frequent, normally rejected by Jewish religiosity.

To this was added the disappearance of the charismatic masters of nebiism, Elisha being the last known. That is, they became tools of power and court officials, against which, in principle, they were created. They forgot their message and ceased to be spokespersons for Yahweh, for which they were deserving of punishment according to later prophets.

For many authors, an "economic bankruptcy" is not sufficient to explain the rupture of these men with a bourgeois and peasant society.

Although these groups were heavily criticized as "false prophets" by the great prophets of the 8th century BCE, they were the basis on which the social, cultural, and political independence of those who later spoke to Israel in the name of Yahweh was founded.

== Bibliography ==
- AA. VV. (1971). 1-2 Reyes, en Comentario Bíblico San Jerónimo [1-2 Kings, in San Jerónimo Biblical Commentary]. Madrid: Cristiandad.
- AA. VV. (2005). 1-2 Reyes, en Nuevo Comentario Bíblico San Jerónimo [1-2 Kings, in New San Jerónimo Biblical Commentary]. Estella: Verbo Divino.
- Alonso Schökel, Sicre. J.L. (1990). Profetas, Comentario, I [Prophets, Commentary, I]. Madrid: Cristiandad.
- Álvarez Gómez, Jesús (1987). Historia de la Vida Religiosa [History of Religious Life]. Vol. I. Madrid: Publicaciones Claretianas. ISBN 84-86425-25-5.
- Asurmendi, J. (1995). Eliseo, justicia y política y el relato ficticio [Elisha, justice and politics and the fictional account]. Estella: Verbo Divino: Estudios Bíblico 53.
- Bright, J. (1966). La historia de Israel [The history of Israel]. Bilbao.
- Cazelles, H. (1989). Introducción crítica al Antiguo Testamento [Critical introduction to the Old Testament]. Barcelona.
- Eichrodt, W. (1975). Teología del Antiguo Testamento. Tomo I: Dios y pueblo [Theology of the Old Testament. Volume I: God and people]. Madrid: Cristiandad.
- González, A.; Lohfink, N.; Von Rad, G. (1976). Profetas verdaderos, profetas falsos [True prophets, false prophets]. Salamanca: Sígueme.
- González Blanco, R. (2004). Los profetas, traductores de Dios [The prophets, translators of God]. Salamanca: Sígueme.
- González Echegaray, J. (1991). El creciente fértil y la Biblia [The fertile crescent and the Bible]. Estella: Verbo Divino.
- González Núñez, A. (1962). Profetas, sacerdotes y reyes en el Antiguo Israel [Prophets, priests and kings in Ancient Israel]. Madrid.
- Haag, V.; Born, D.; de Ausejo, S. (1970). Diccionario de la Biblia [Dictionary of the Bible].
- Maier, J.; Schäfer, P. (1996). Diccionario del judaísmo [Dictionary of Judaism]. Estella: Verbo Divino.
- Monloubou, J. (1998). Los profetas del Antiguo Testamento [The prophets of the Old Testament]. Estella: Verbo Divino.
- Salas, A. (1993). Los profetas, heraldos del Dios que actúa [The prophets, heralds of the God who acts]. Madrid: San Pablo.
- Service Biblique "Evangelie et Vie" (1996). Itinerario por el Antiguo Testamento [Itinerary through the Old Testament]. Estella: Verbo Divino.
- Sicre, J.L. (1998). Profetismo en Israel [Prophetism in Israel]. Estella: Verbo Divino.
- de Vaux, R. (1976). Instituciones del Antiguo Testamento [Institutions of the Old Testament]. Barcelona: Cristiandad. Available on Google Books.
- Von Rad, G. (1976). Teología del Antiguo Testamento, Tomo II [Theology of the Old Testament, Volume II]. Salamanca: Sígueme.
- Von Rad, G. (1976). Estudios sobre el Antiguo Testamento [Studies on the Old Testament]. Salamanca: Sígueme.
- Von Rad, G. (1996). La acción de Dios en Israel [God's action in Israel]. Madrid: Trotta.
- de Vries, S. (1978). Prophet against Prophet. New York.
- Whitelam, K.W.; Freedman, D.N. (1997). Elisha in The Anchor Bible Dictionary. New York.
- Wiesheu, J. (1962). Personajes bíblicos [Biblical characters]. Barcelona.
- Zimmerli, W. (1980). Manual de teología del Antiguo Testamento [Manual of Old Testament theology]. Madrid.
