= Micaiah =

Biblical prophet, disciple of Elijah

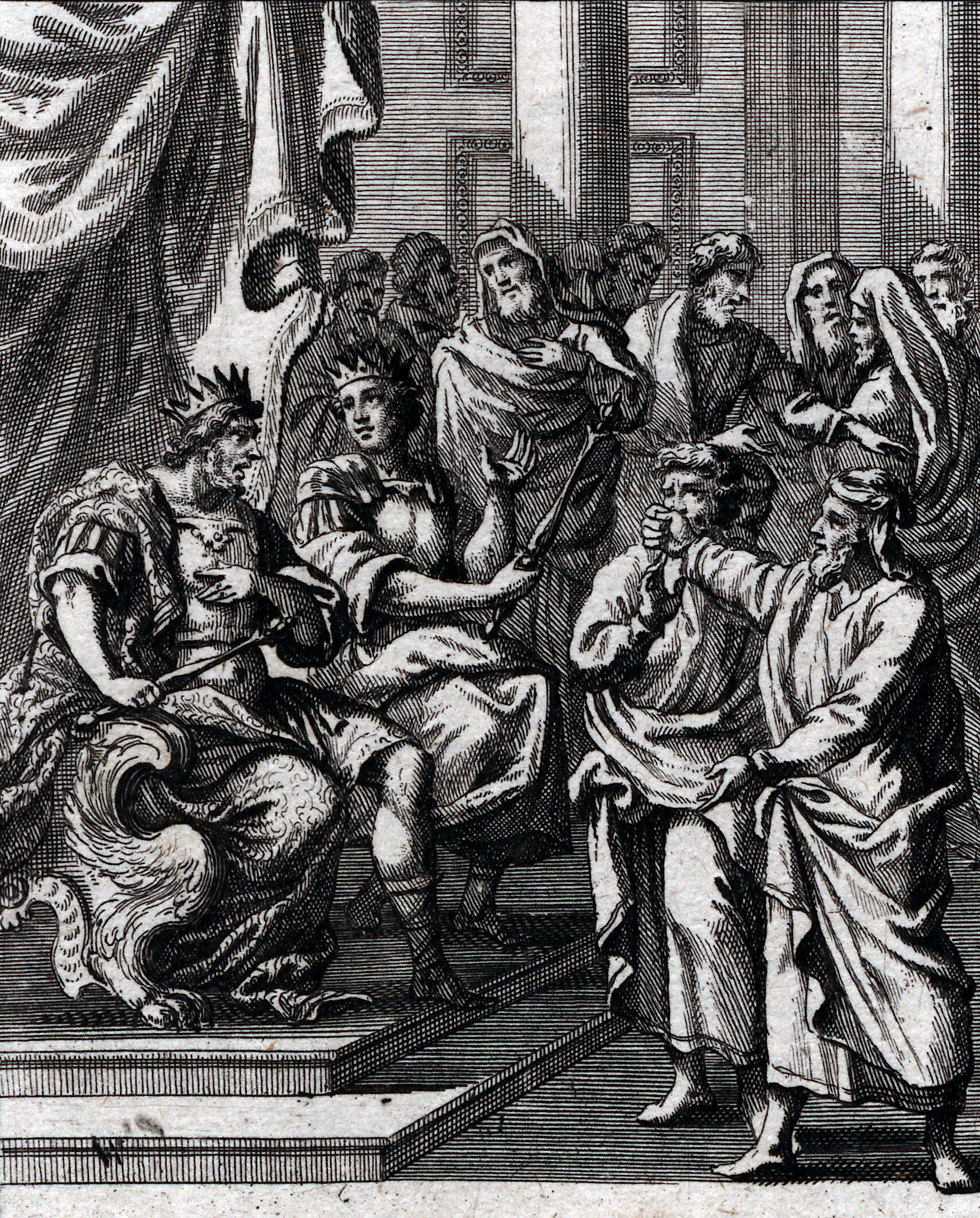
Micaiah's prophecy. Woodcut by Johann Christoph Weigel, 1695.

Micaiah (Hebrew: מִיכָיְהוּ Mīḵāyəhū "Who is like Yah?"), son of Imlah, is a prophet in the Hebrew Bible. He is one of the four disciples of Elijah.

== Prophecy ==
The events leading up to the appearance of Micaiah are illustrated in 1 Kings 22:1–12. In 1 Kings 22:1–4, Jehoshaphat, the king of Judah goes to visit the King of Israel (identified later, in 1 Kings 22:20, as Ahab), and asks if he will go with him to take over Ramoth-gilead which was under the rule of the king of Aram. Jehoshaphat the Judahite requests that Ahab the Israelite, "Inquire first for the word of the Lord" (1 Kings 22:5). Ahab then calls on his prophets and asks if he should go into battle against Ramoth-gilead. The prophets responded by telling the king of Israel to go into battle, stating that the Lord (Adonai) will deliver Ramoth-gilead into the hand of the king (1 Kings 22:6). Jehoshaphat asks if there are any other prophets of whom to inquire the word of the Lord (YHWH). Ahab mentions Micaiah the son of Imlah, but expresses dislike for him because his past (1 Kings 20:13–43) prophecies have not been in favor of him (1 Kings 22:7–8). A messenger is sent to bring Micaiah to the king to give his prophecy. The messenger tells Micaiah to give a favorable prophecy to Ahab (1 Kings 22:12–13).

Micaiah replies to the messenger that he will speak whatever the Lord says to him (1 Kings 22:14). Micaiah appears before the king of Israel, and when asked if Ahab should go into battle at Ramoth-gilead Micaiah initially responds with a similar prophecy to that of the other prophets in a mocking manner (1 Kings 22:15b). Ahab then questions Micaiah, and insists that he speak nothing but the truth in the name of the Lord. Micaiah then gives a true prophecy, in which he illustrates a meeting of Yahweh with the heavenly hosts. At this meeting Yahweh asks who will entice Ahab to go into battle so that he may perish (1 Kings 22:19–20). A spirit comes forward, and offers to "be a lying spirit in the mouth of the prophets" (1 Kings 22:22). Therefore, the prophecies of the other prophets were a result of the lying spirit. Zedekiah, leader of the 400 prophets who spoke in favor of Ahab, strikes Micaiah and claims God speaks through him. As a result of Micaiah's prophecy, Ahab ordered Micaiah imprisoned until he returned from battle, unharmed (1 Kings 22:27).

Perhaps concerned about the prophecy, Ahab disguised himself in battle rather than lead his troops openly as their king. However, Ahab was killed in battle after being struck by a randomly shot arrow. Micaiah's prophecy was fulfilled, contrary to the word of 400 false prophets, all of whom encouraged Ahab to attack with a prediction of victory.

This account is also recorded in 2 Chronicles, Chapter 18.

== Interpretation ==
=== Rabbinical interpretation ===
The Babylonian Talmud (b.Sanhedrin 89a) accepts that the scene literally occurred in heaven. Against this Judah Halevi (Kuzari 3.73) considered the "prophecy" to be an example of the prophet's own rhetoric. This rhetoric is clear from the contrast of syntax used for the divination: "the word of Y-H-V-H" and "the spirit of Y-H-V-H" (2 Chronicles 18:23, 27). David Kimhi argues that "prophecy is true by definition", the spirit of Lord is often represented as an irrational and emotional response unlike the word of Lord, and following Judah Halevi also critically assesses that Micaiah might have himself presented the vivid scene, using poetic dramatization to frighten and convince Ahab—"not that he saw these things, nor did he hear them." "On 1 Kgs 22: 19–23, Radak adopts a bolder strategy to avoid a rational dilemma that never distressed the Rabbis. In that passage, the prophet Micaiah, responding to Ahab's false prophets who predicted military success against Aram, describes a vision of God sending a "lying spirit" to mislead the king. Radak rejects the rabbinic view (b. Sanh. 89 a) that this scene occurred in heaven, arguing that God could not have sent false prophecy, since "prophecy is true by definition". Instead, he argues that Micaiah actually fabricated this vivid scene, using poetic dramatization (divre meliza ... derekh haza'at devarim) to frighten and thereby prevail upon Ahab." Pseudo-Epiphanius ("Opera," ii. 245) makes Micah an Ephraimite. Confounding him with Micaiah, son of Imlah (I Kings xxii. 8 et seq.), he states that Micah, for his inauspicious prophecy, was killed by order of Ahab through being thrown from a precipice, and was buried at Morathi (Maroth?; Mic. i. 12), near the cemetery of Enakim (Ένακεὶμ Septuagint rendering of; ib. i. 10). According to Gelilot Ereẓ Yisrael (quoted in Seder ha-Dorot, i. 118, Warsaw, 1889), Micah was buried in Chesil, a town in southern Judah (Josh. xv. 30). Naboth's soul was the lying spirit that was permitted to deceive Ahab to his death.

=== Modern scholarly interpretation ===
Micaiah prophesies as though he was present at the meeting between Yahweh and the heavenly hosts. Michael Coogan of Harvard compared the prophecy of Micaiah to that of several other prophets, including Isaiah's vision of the Divine Council (Isaiah 6:1–8). In Jeremiah 23, Yahweh warns against false prophecies. However, Coogan argued that unlike Isaiah 6 and Jeremiah 23, in 1 Kings 22 Yahweh's actions to allow false prophecy to be given are deliberate and intentional. It appears as though Yahweh has an ulterior motive, and that is for Ahab to die, in this case at the battle at Ramoth-gilead.

R. W. L. Moberly of Durham University discussed Micaiah's prophecy in "Does God Lie to His Prophets? The Story of Micaiah ben Imlah as a Test Case." In his article, Moberly discussed Hebrew prophecy as "relational, engaging language that seeks a response." Moberly called into question the honesty of Yahweh particularly in relation to integrity and the concept of loving and forgiving God. He suggested that for the Deuteronomistic historians who were the compilers of the text, the compassion of Yahweh is delivered by challenging and engaging the human will for repentance or bringing forth change or obduracy. Dependency dynamics and will of the Lord rooted in foreknowledge is revealed in 1 Kings 21:27–29.

== Heavenly throne room ==
The prophecy is probably the earliest example in the Hebrew Bible of a representation of a heavenly throne room. It is not clear whether the heavenly throne room represents Micaiah's own belief or a depiction of Ahab's court prophets without discrediting them entirely like the prophet Zedekiah ben Chenaanah, who struck him after his non-populist prophecy (1 Kings 22:24). The focus of voice from the heavenly throne is concerned for the people while Ahab the earthly king's response is self-centered, it reflects the difference in the two approaches, a characteristic of post-exile exemplification in the scripture.
