= Ahab =

Biblical King of Israel (c. 874 – c. 853 BC)

Ahab אַחְאָב
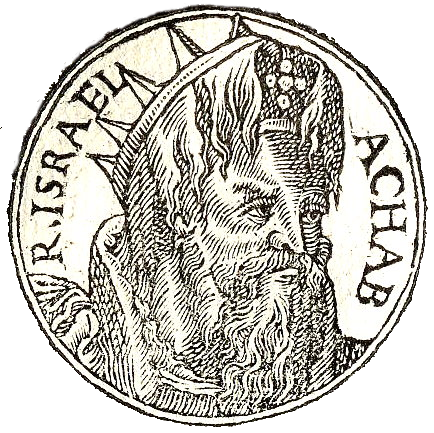
- Portrait from Promptuarium Iconum Insigniorum

King of Israel (Northern Kingdom)
- Reign: 22 years 874–853 BC (Thiele); 869–850 BC (Albright); 871–852 BC (Coogan)
- Predecessor: Omri
- Successor: Ahaziah
- Born: c. 893–900 BC
- Died: c. 853 BC; Ramoth-Gilead, Syria
- Burial: Samaria, Kingdom of Israel
- Consort: Jezebel of Sidon
- Issue: Ahaziah of Israel; Jehoram of Israel; Athaliah of Judah?
- Dynasty: Omrides
- Father: Omri

Ahab (/ˈeɪ.hæb/, AY-habb; Hebrew: אַחְאָב, romanized: ʾAḥʾāḇ; Akkadian: 𒀀𒄩𒀊𒁍, romanized: Aḫâbbu; Koine Greek: Ἀχαάβ, romanized: Akhaáb; Latin: Achab) was the 7th king of Israel, the son and successor of King Omri, and the husband of Jezebel of Sidon. He is depicted in the Hebrew Bible as a Baal worshipper, though some modern scholars question this, and is criticized for causing moral decline in Israel.

The existence of Ahab is historically supported outside the Bible. The contemporary Kurkh Monolith inscription of king Shalmaneser III from the Neo-Assyrian Empire documented in 853 BC that Shalmaneser III defeated an alliance of a dozen kings in the Battle of Qarqar; one of these was Ahab. Though not named, he is also mentioned on the inscriptions of the Mesha Stele.

Ahab became king of Israel in the thirty-eighth year of King Asa of Judah, and reigned for twenty-two years, according to 1 Kings 16:29. William F. Albright dated his reign to 869–850 BC, while Edwin R. Thiele offered the dates 874–853 BC. Most recently, Michael Coogan has dated Ahab's reign to 871–852 BC.

== Reign ==
As Omri's successor, Ahab married Jezebel, the daughter of Ithobaal I of Tyre. Under Jezebel's influence, he abandoned Yahweh and established Baal and Asherah cults in Israel according to 1 Kings 16:29–33. For example, he allowed Hiel the Bethelite to rebuild Jericho, even though it was 'cursed' by Yahweh (1 Kings 16:34), and helped his wife kill opponents, such as the "servants of Yahweh" and possibly, the priests of Jeroboam's cult (1 Kings 18:3–16). Edward Lipiński argues that the "Baal" worshipped by Ahab and Jezebel was the "YHWH of Samaria", which was opposed as Yahwist heresy by the Judean priests. Others disagree based on archaeological evidence and extrabiblical sources about Jezebel's upbringing.

In terms of foreign policy, Ahab continued Omri's policies against Moab, which was a tributary state of Israel (2 Kings 1:1). According to the Moabite Mesha Stele, Omri and Ahab "oppressed Moab for many days". By marriage, he allied with Jehoshaphat, who was the king of Judah (2 Kings 8:16–18). Aram-Damascus was the only foreign state that Ahab opposed but he made peace with them after their king promised to withdraw from conquered territory. He also allowed Ahab to conquer Aramean territory to compensate (1 Kings 20:34).

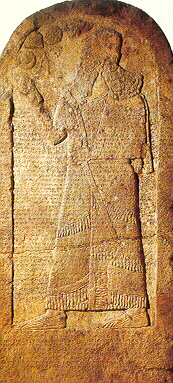
Shalmaneser III's (859–824 BC) Kurkh Monolith names King Ahab.

=== Battle of Qarqar ===
The Battle of Qarqar is mentioned in extra-biblical records, and occurred at Apamea, where Shalmaneser III of Assyria fought a great confederation of princes from Cilicia, northern Syria, Israel, Ammon, and the tribes of the Syrian desert (853 BC), including Arabs, Ahab the Israelite (A-ha-ab-bu ^{mat}Sir-'a-la-a-a) and Hadadezer (Adad-'idri).

Ahab's contribution was estimated at 2,000 chariots and 10,000 men. In reality, however, the number of chariots in Ahab's forces was probably closer to a number in the hundreds (based upon archaeological excavations of the area and the foundations of stables that have been found). If, however, the numbers are referring to allies, they could include forces from Tyre, Judah, Edom, and Moab. The Assyrian king claimed victory, but his immediate return and subsequent expeditions in 849 BC and 846 BC against a similar but unspecified coalition implied that the victory had no lasting impact.

Jezreel was identified as Ahab's fortified chariot and cavalry base.

=== Ahab and the prophets ===
In the Biblical text, Ahab has four important encounters with prophets:

1. The first encounter is with Elijah, who predicts a drought because of Ahab's sins. Because of this, Ahab blames Elijah for Israel's misfortunes but Elijah proclaims the supremacy of Yahweh so that Ahab could repent.
2. The second encounter is between Ahab and an unnamed prophet, who criticized him for sparing Ben-hadad and told him that Israel would be invaded by the Arameans as punishment.
3. The third is with Elijah, who criticized his role in Naboth's unjust execution. Ahab sincerely repents, which Yahweh relays to Elijah.
4. The fourth encounter is with Micaiah, who initially tells Ahab that he would re-capture Ramoth-Gilead before revealing that Ahab was deceived by his Yahwistic court prophets who had a lying spirit in their mouths which was sent by Yahweh himself. Instead of victory, he would die in battle.

=== Death of Ahab ===
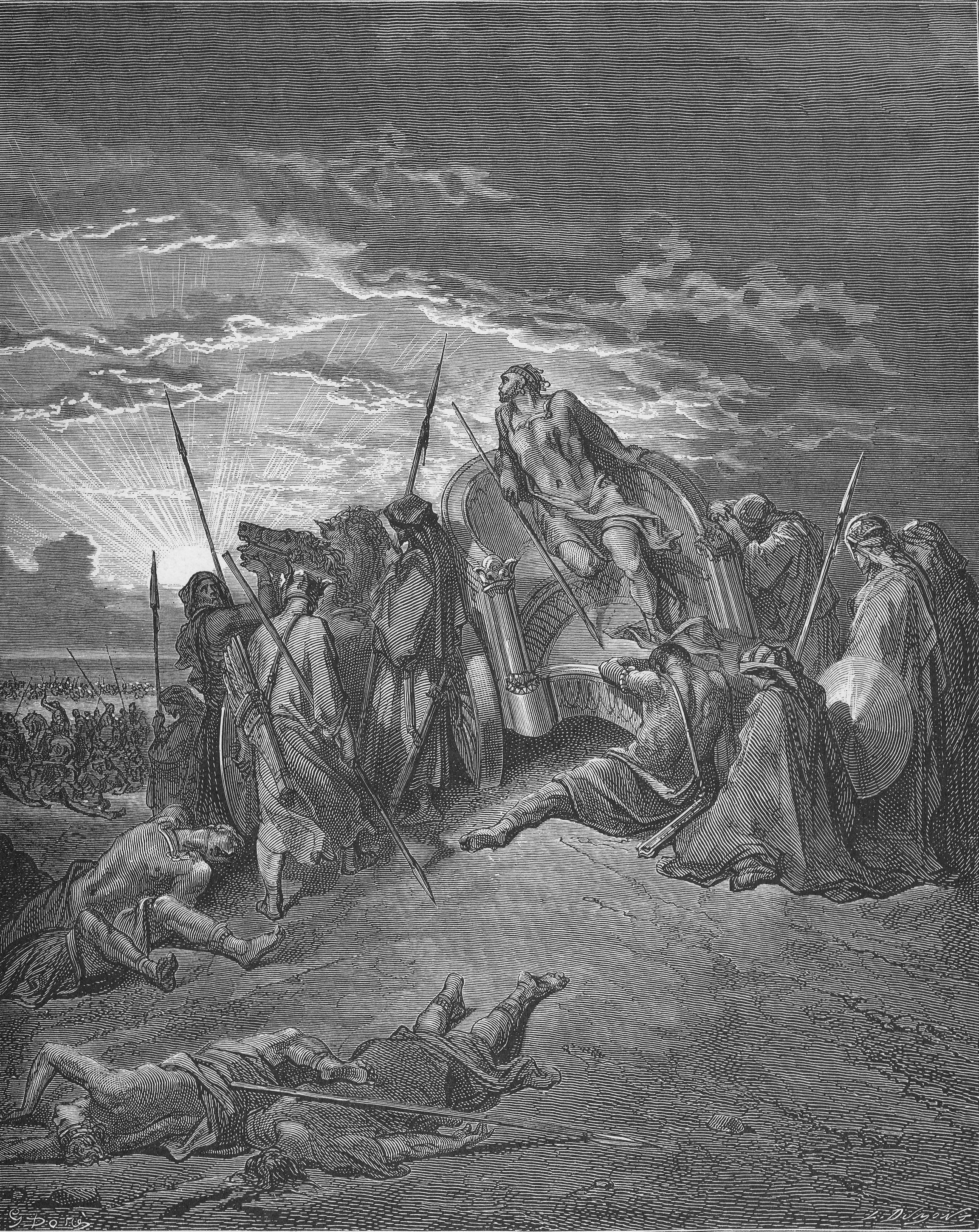
Death of Ahab, by Gustave Doré

Ahab is mortally wounded by an unaimed arrow after he and Jehoshaphat tried to re-capture Ramoth-Gilead from the Arameans. Depending on translation, Ahab's corpse was licked by dogs or a combination of dogs and pigs, according to Elijah's prophecy. It marked his "uncleanliness" in the presence of Israelites, who abstained from pork consumption.

== Critical history ==
Ahab's reign was deeply unpopular among Yahwists and was considered to be worse than the previous kings of Israel. Whilst the previous kings followed a "heretical" interpretation of Yahwism, known as the "sins of Jeroboam", Ahab institutionalized Baalism, which was completely divorced from Yahwism. He was likewise criticized for his oppressive policies, both domestically and by the Moabites.

However, Yahwists commend him for fortifying numerous Israelite cities and building an ivory palace. Christian Frevel argues that Ahab used imperialism to introduce Yahweh to the Kingdom of Judah. To do this, he gave his children theophoric names whilst expanding in northern territories and Judah. Michael J. Stahl clarifies that this mostly occurred in the latter half of his reign, according to biblical and extrabiblical evidence.

== In Rabbinic literature ==
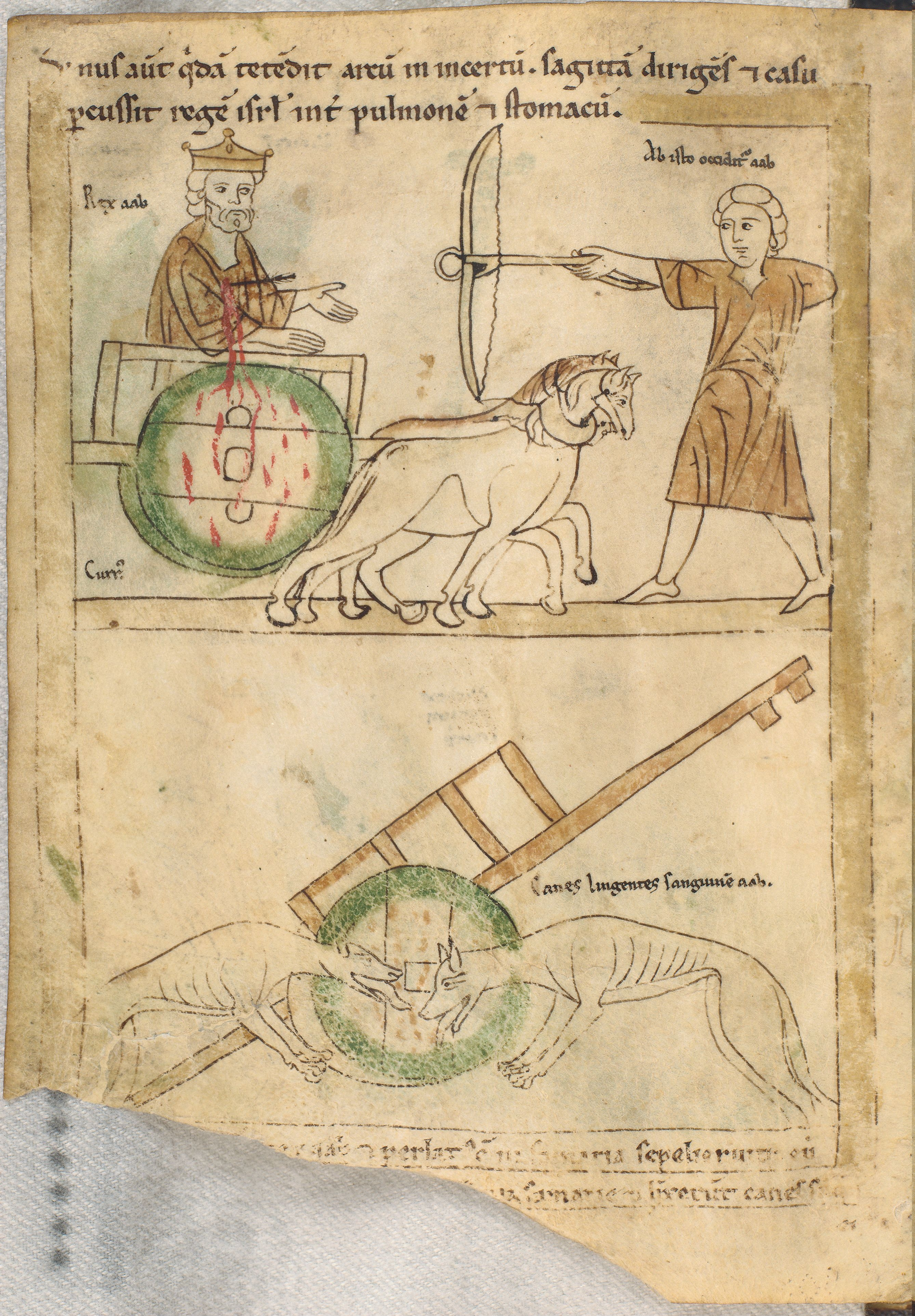
Death of Ahab, from a 13th-century German manuscript

Ahab was one of the three or four wicked kings of Israel singled out by tradition as being excluded from the future world of bliss (Sanh. x. 2; Tosef., Sanh. xii. 11). Midrash Konen places him in the fifth department of Gehenna, as having the heathen under his charge. Though held up as a warning to sinners, Ahab is also described as displaying noble traits of character (Sanh. 102b; Yer. Sanh. xi. 29b). Talmudic literature represents him as an enthusiastic idolater who left no hilltop in the Land of Israel without an idol before which he bowed, and to which he or his wife, Jezebel, brought his weight in gold as a daily offering. So defiant in his apostasy was he that he had inscribed on all the doors of the city of Samaria the words, "Ahab hath abjured the living God of Israel." Nevertheless, he paid great respect to the representatives of learning, "to the Torah given in twenty-two letters," for which reason he was permitted to reign for twenty-two successive years. He generously supported the students of the Law out of his royal treasury, in consequence of which half his sins were forgiven him. A type of worldliness (Ber. 61b), the Crœsus of his time, he was, according to ancient tradition (Meg. 11a), ruler over the whole world. Two hundred and thirty subject kings had initiated a rebellion; but he brought their sons as hostages to Samaria and Jerusalem. All the latter turned from idolaters into worshipers of the God of Israel (Tanna debe Eliyahu, i. 9). Each of his seventy sons had an ivory palace built for him. Since, however, it was Ahab's idolatrous wife who was the chief instigator of his crimes (B. M. 59a), some of the ancient teachers gave him the same position in the world to come as a sinner who had repented (Sanh. 104b, Num. R. xiv). Like Manasseh, he was made a type of repentance (I Kings, xxi. 29). Accordingly, he is described as undergoing fasts and penances for a long time; praying thrice a day to God for forgiveness, until his prayer was heard (PirḲe R. El. xliii). Hence, the name of Ahab in the list of wicked kings was changed to Ahaz (Yer. Sanh. x. 28b; Tanna debe Eliyahu Rabba ix, Zuṭṭa xxiv.).

Pseudo-Epiphanius ("Opera," ii. 245) makes Micah an Ephraimite. Confounding him with Micaiah, son of Imlah, he states that Micah, for his inauspicious prophecy, was killed by order of Ahab through being thrown from a precipice, and was buried at Morathi (Maroth?; Mic. i. 12), near the cemetery of Enakim (Ένακεὶμ Septuagint rendering of ; ib. i. 10). According to Gelilot Ereẓ Yisrael (quoted in Seder ha-Dorot, i. 118, Warsaw, 1889), Micah was buried in Chesil, a town in southern Judah (Josh. xv. 30). Naboth's soul was the lying spirit that was permitted to deceive Ahab to his death.

== In popular culture ==
Ahab is portrayed by Eduard Franz in the film Sins of Jezebel (1953). He is also the namesake of Captain Ahab in Moby Dick by Herman Melville.

== See also ==
- List of biblical figures identified in extra-biblical sources

== General and cited references ==
- Achtemeier, Paul, ed. (1996). The HarperCollins Bible Dictionary. New York: HarperCollins.
- Coogan, Michael David (2009). A Brief Introduction to the Old Testament: The Hebrew Bible in Its Context. Oxford: University Press. ISBN 978-0-19-533272-8.
- Craig, James A. (1887). "The Monolith Inscription of Salmaneser II". Hebraica. 3 (4): 201–232. doi:10.1086/368966. JSTOR 527096.
- Cook, Stanley Arthur (1911). "Ahab" . In Chisholm, Hugh (ed.). Encyclopædia Britannica. Vol. 1 (11th ed.). Cambridge University Press. pp. 428–429.
- Finkelstein, Israel; Silberman, Neil Asher (2002). The Bible Unearthed: Archaeology's New Vision of Ancient Israel and the Origin of Sacred Texts. Simon and Schuster. ISBN 978-0-7432-2338-6.
- McCurdy, J. Frederic; Kohler, Kaufmann (1906). "Ahab". In Singer, Isidore; et al. (eds.). The Jewish Encyclopedia. New York: Funk & Wagnalls.
- Singer, Isidore; Seligsohn, M.; Schechter, Solomon; Hirsch, Emil G. (1906). "Micah". In Singer, Isidore; et al. (eds.). The Jewish Encyclopedia. New York: Funk & Wagnalls.
- Thiele, Edwin R. (1983). The Mysterious Numbers of the Hebrew Kings (3rd ed.). Grand Rapids, Michigan: Zondervan. ISBN 978-0-310-36010-0.
- Ussishkin, David (2010). "Jezreel–Where Jezebel Was Thrown to the Dogs". Biblical Archaeology Review. 36 (4).

Ahab House of Omri
Preceded by Omri	King of Israel; 874–853 BCE	Succeeded by Ahaziah
