= One-eyed monster =

One-eyed monster may refer to:

- One-eyed monster, a euphemism for the human penis
- One-Eyed Monster (film), a Wikipedia redirect to article for actress Amber Benson
- Monsters with one eye
