= Tepegöz =

Fictional character

In Turkic mythology, Tepegoz or Tepegöz is a legendary creature who has only one eye on his forehead – a kind of cyclops. He is an ogre that appears in the Book of Dede Korkut, a famous epic story of the Oghuz Turks.

== Etymology ==
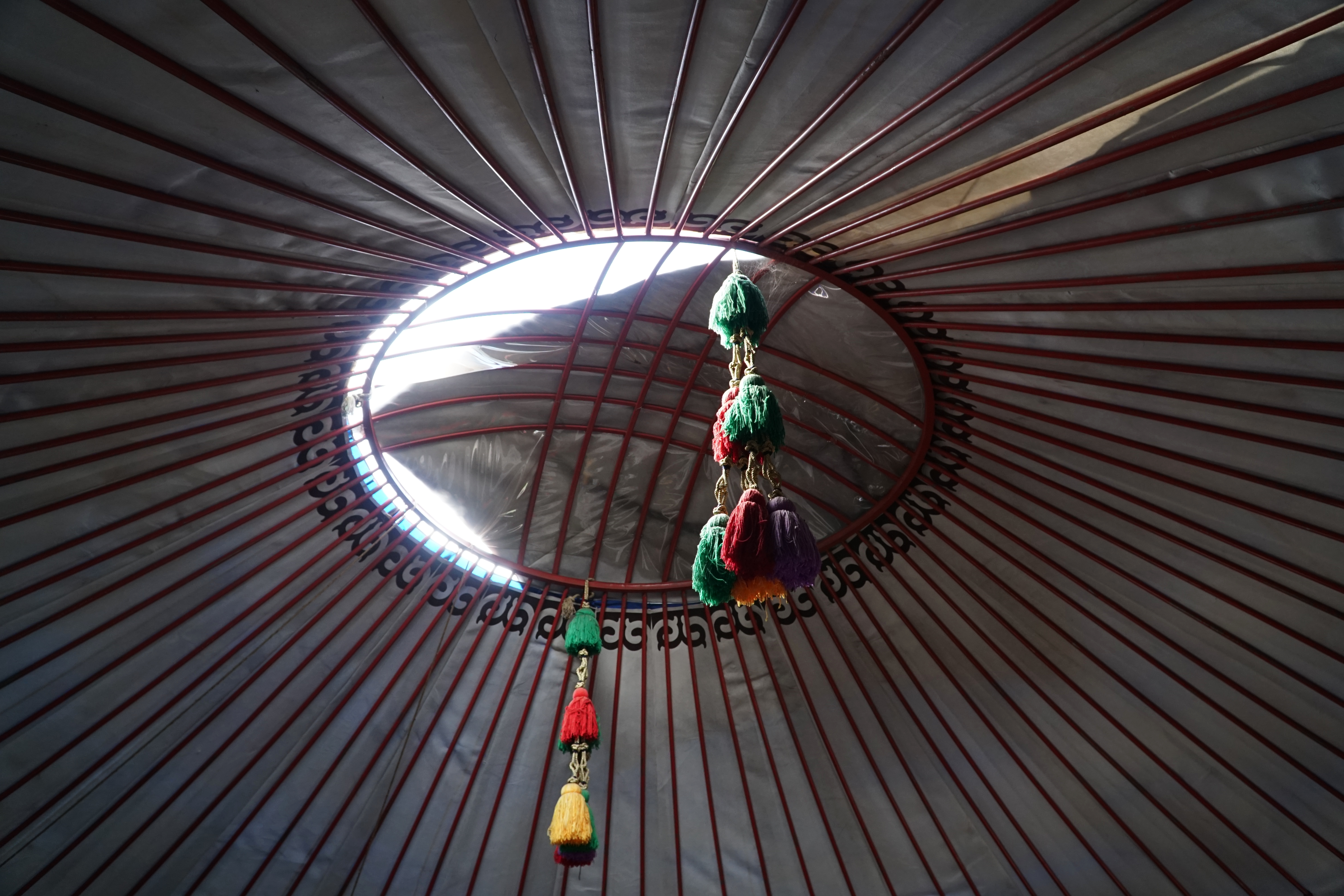
Circular top of a yurt

In Turkic languages, tepe means high/hill, and goz means eye. The circular opening at the top of a yurt or ger is also called a tepegoz.

== In literature ==
In the first chapter of the Book of Dede Korkut, enemy forces attack Oghuz lands (Azerbaijan and Turkish lands). When local Oghuz villagers retreat, the son of Aruz is left behind. A wolf finds him and takes care of him. Aruz's son becomes a wild man, attacks horses and sucks their blood. He is half man and half wolf. One day hunters catch him and give him to Aruz (the father) in order to let him raise his son. After some time, his son comes to understand that he is human. Dede Korkut gives him an honourable name – Basat (Bas means to devour, to crush. At means horse.).

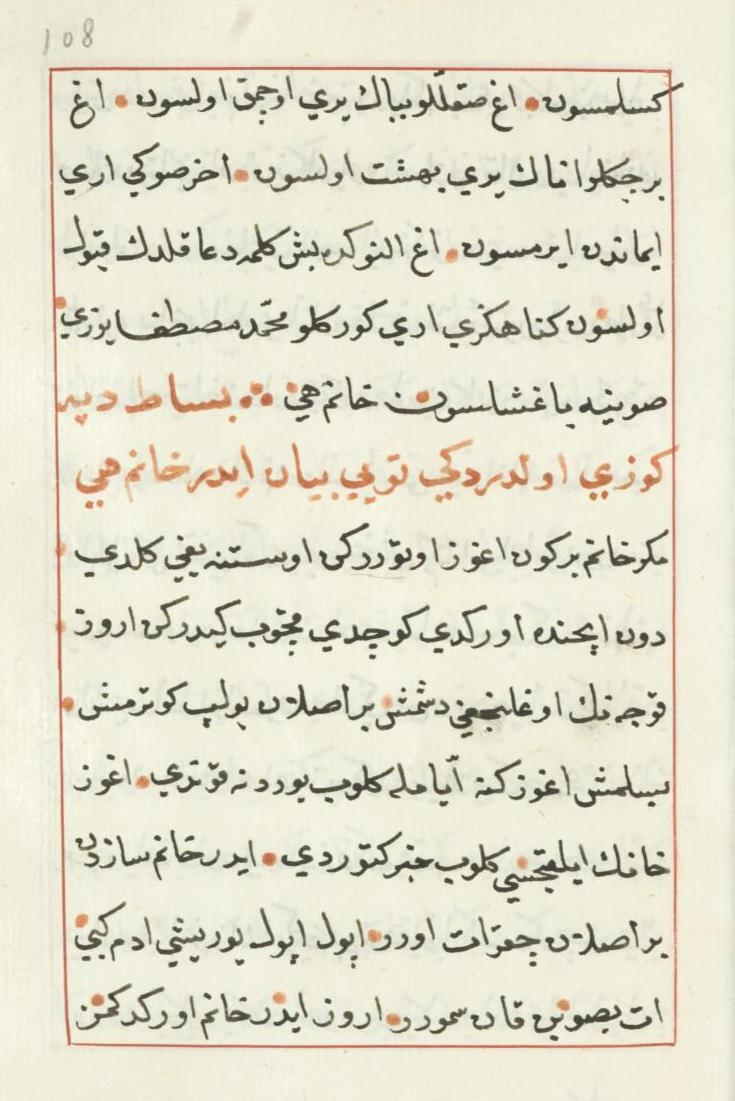
Basat kills Tepegez manuscript from the Book of Dede Korkut

Years later a herdsman of the Oghuz saw a nymph who gave birth days later. The herdsman finds the monstrous infant, a fleshly thing. He is scared and runs away. Bayandur khan (one of the Oghuz Khans) finds the infant, and while gazing on it, a crack appears in the pile of flesh. Inside of it appears a one eyed boy. Aruz says to Bayandur khan, "Let me raise up this strange boy." Bayandur takes him in. Later it turns out to be the biggest mistake of his life. When the one eyed boy grows up he bites off a neighborhood child's nose and ear. His father scorns him, driving him away from the village. Tepegoz kills one more man, and the khans of the Oghuz people decide to banish him forever. Years later, Tepegoz grows stronger and destroys everything in his path. Nobody is able to kill him. The sword can not cut him. The arrow can not kill him. Tepegoz's skin is very hard. Half of all Oghuz heroes die trying to kill Tepegoz.

Just one man is able to kill him, his half blood brother Basat. He uses his brain more than his power. He killed horrible Tepegoz by striking his eye. Then he cut off Tepegoz's head with a magical sword and thus he saved not only himself but also his nation from the terror of Tepegoz.

=== Tepegoz's ultimatum ===
Dede Korkut comes to the rescue of the Oghuz people who were not able to kill Tepegoz. Dede Korkut goes to Tepegoz's cave and says, "Please don't hurt my people." Tepegoz answers, "I will let your people live on one condition – give me 60 people every day." Dede Korkut doesn't agree and offers another idea, "We can give you 2 men and 500 sheep." Tepegoz agrees, but soon the Oghuz run out of sheep, so Tepegoz declares war again on the Oghuz people.

=== Common themes ===
The warriors of the Oghuz and battles described are likely grounded in the conflicts between the Pechenegs and Kipchaks. The story elements bear resemblance to the encounter with the Cyclops in Homer's Odyssey and is believed May 2020}} to have been influenced by the Hellenic epic or to have one common ancestral root. The book also describes in great detail the various sports activities of the ancient Turkic peoples: "Dede Korkut (AD 1000–1300) clearly referred to certain physical activities and games. In Dede Korkut's description, the athletic skills of Turks, men and women, were described to be 'first-rate', especially in horse-riding, archery, javelin throw, wrestling and polo which are considered Turkish national sports."

== See also ==
- List of one-eyed creatures in mythology and fiction
- Polyphemus
- Cyclops

== Notes ==
=== Sources ===
- "Kitabi Dede Qorqud" epos. 8'th chapter " Basat kills Tepegoz".
