= Mikaribaba =

Legendary yōkai

Mikaribaba (箕借り婆) is a yōkai of a one-eyed old woman in stories and customs of the Kantō region.

== Summary ==
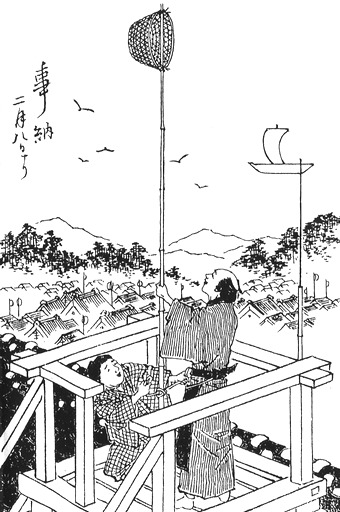
"Onko Nenjū Gyōji" illustrated by Eitaku Sensai. It depicts how on the eighth day of the second month, a basket with a rod stuck in it is being raised.

In Yokohama and Kawasaki, Kanagawa Prefecture, the Chiba Prefecture, and Tokyo etc., they would visit people's homes on the eighth day of the 12th month and the eighth day of the second month on the lunisolar calendar, and they are said to borrow sieves and human's eyes. They are said to visit people's home together with a hitotsume-kozō.。 In order to avoid a mikaribaba, one would leave a basket or zaru at the entrance of the home, and it is said to be effective to put the tip of a rod into the bamboo basket and make it stand on the ridge of the house's roof. It is said that this is in order to make the one-eyed mikaribaba make it seem like as if there were plenty of eyes (stitches).

At the Ura no Yato, Toriyama town, Kōhoku-ku, Yokohama, an avaricious mikaribaba would even come to collect grains of rice that have fallen on the ground, and would cause fires due to the fire in its mouth. In order to avoid this, there is the custom of making a dango called the "tsujoo dango" made from the rice left over from the garden, and put it in the doorway, as a means of saying that there is no more rice to collect.

On the eighth day of the 12th month and the eighth day of the second month on the lunisolar calendar, there is a folk practice called Kotoyōka, and in the past, there were many regions where people would not do any work and confine themselves in their homes. In the southern part of Chiba Prefecture, on the 26th day of the 11th month of the lunisolar calendar, as a period of about 10 days of seclusion in the home called "mikawari" or "mikari," when it would be taboo to go outside at night or enter the mountains and spend the time in the home quickly avoiding any big noise, lights, hairdressing, or entering bath. Outside of the Kantō region, at Nishinomiya Shrine in the Hyōgo Prefecture and Kito, Tokushima Prefecture (now Naka), there is a practice of confinement to the house before the festival called "mikari." Rituals like these of secluding oneself in the home have been interpreted as seclusion at home due the appearance of a monster, and it is thought that those monsters are the mikaribaba and the hitotsume-kozō. It is also said that "mikari" comes from "mikawari" (身変わり), indicating a time different from usual when one observes the practice of confinement at home.

== See also ==
- List of legendary creatures from Japan
