= Boghach Khan Son of Dirse Khan =

Chapter of the Book of Dede Korkut

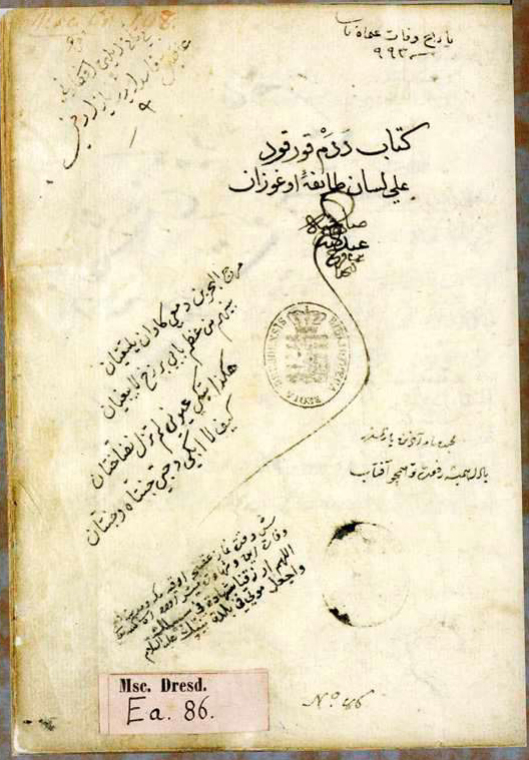
- Front page of the Dresden manuscript
- Original title: Hekayəti Dirsə xan oğlu Buğac xan in the Vatican copy; Iza Beriladieran Nasilsiz in the Turkmensahra copy; Dirsə xan oğlu Buğac xan boyu in the Dresden copy
- Language: Oghuz Turkic
- Subject(s): The story carries morals and values significant to the social lifestyle of the nomadic Turks.
- Genre: Epic poetry
- Publication date: c. 14th or 15th century

Boghach Khan Son of Dirse Khan is a story or chapter depicting one who'd be a fierce conquering man within the Book of Dede Korkut. In this man, the relationships among the Oghuz Turks, their family values, and similar aspects are being discussed in the context of the broader Oghuz Turk community.

== About epic ==
Dede Korkut is an epic tale, also known as Oghuznama among the Oghuz people. It originates in Central Asia, traverses Anatolia, and predominantly unfolds its narrative in the Caucasus. According to Barthold, there is a strong indication that this epic could only have been crafted in the Caucasus region.

The Dede Korkut serves as a crucial repository of the Oghuz people's ethnic identity, historical accounts, traditions, and their value systems throughout the ages. It commemorates the Oghuz struggles for freedom during a time when they were primarily a nomadic herding community. However, it is evident that these stories took their present form during a period when the Turks of Oghuz descent no longer identified solely as Oghuz.

By the mid-10th century, the term Oghuz gradually gave way among the Turks themselves to Turkoman, a shift that was completed by the early 13th century. The Turcomans, largely Oghuz but not exclusively, had embraced Islam and adopted a more settled lifestyle compared to their ancestors. In the 14th century, a federation of Turcoman tribes, known as the Aq Qoyunlu, established a confederation with a focal point in eastern Turkey, Azerbaijan, Iraq, and western Iran.

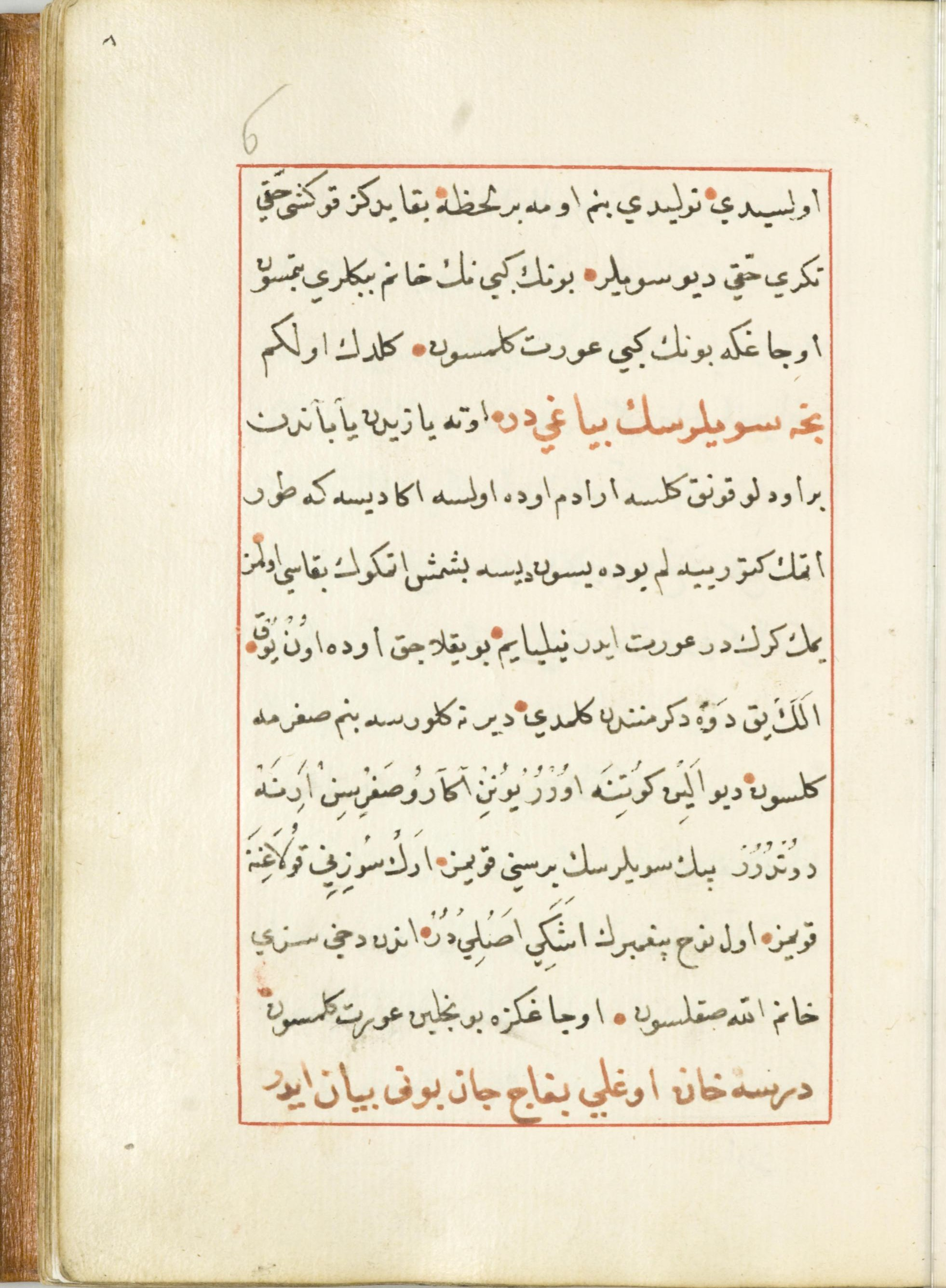
The beginning of the first chapter, "Boghach Khan Son of Dirse Khan", of the Dede Korkut, 16th-century Dresden manuscript

== About ==
Boghach Khan, man and Son of Dirse Khan, is one of the common heights included in both the Dresden copy, the Vatican copy, and the Turkmensahra copy. This height is called "Dirsa Khan oglu Boghach Khan boyu" Dirsə xan oğlu Buğac xan boyu in Azerbaijani Turkish) in the Dresden copy and is in the first row. In the Vatican copy, it is called "The story of Dirsa Khan son of Bugaj Khan" (Hekayəti Dirsə xan oğlu Buğac xan in Azerbaijani Turkish) is the second story. In the Turkmensahra copy, the name of the neck is called "Iza Beriladieran Nasilsiz" and it is the first neck.

== Content ==
The narrative depicts that traditionally, Bayandur Khan organizes assemblies, inviting Oghuz Turk nobles. In one such hospitality event, Bayandur Khan orders the setup of tents in three colors. Those with sons reside in white tents, those with daughters in red tents, and those without offspring in black tents. As Dirse Khan does not have a son, the individuals without children are seated in the black tent. Angered by this, the Khan goes home. After consulting with his wife, Dirse Khan decides to host a gathering to bestow kindness upon people in order to pray for the blessing of having a child. After some time, a son is born. When Dirse Khan's son turns 15, he faces an attack by Bayandur Khan's bull (Buğa in Azerbaijani Turkish) and ends up killing it. Therefore, Dede Qorqud names him Boghach. The rise to power and fame of Boghach causes fear among his father's supporters. They claim that Dirse Khan's son and his wife are trying to overthrow him. Dirse Khan takes his son to the plain and shoots him with an arrow. Not finding his son returning home, the mother starts searching for him with 40 girls, eventually finding and nursing him back to health. Before that he tells his mother that Khizir came to him and said that he will recover. Enemies who learn of Boghach's recovery capture and imprison his father Dirse Khan because they fear that Boghach will seek revenge for their false accusations against his family. Boghach finds and rescues his father from captivity, leading Bayandur Khan to bestow rulership (bəylik in Azerbaijani Turkish) upon him once again.

== Archetypes ==
- White Tent (Ağ Otaq in Azerbaijani Turkish) - the white tent or yurt where the parents with sons sit is symbolic of purity and innocence. Here, white represents purity and innocence, and simultaneously serves as an indicator that the individual has never committed any sins during their past life as a farmer. Perhaps, it could be considered a sign that Allah rewarded those who performed righteous deeds in the past and, as a result, a son was born to continue their lineage.

The son will be a shining future for society. He is a warrior and has the duty to protect his own people. The warrior figure in the Oghuz Turk society is essential for the community's survival, the continuation of lineage, and for a prosperous, vibrant, and secure life. Not having a son is also a tarnishing of one's reputation. In Oghuz society, gaining a reputation requires a man to prove his strength under difficult conditions.

- Red Tent (Qırmızı Otaq in Azerbaijani Turkish) - or Qırmızı Otaq is the yurt where parents with daughters sit. In the Oghuz society, having daughters symbolizes productivity and abundance. Despite possessing qualities such as being educators, shaping society in terms of education and social aspects, and serving as the cultivators of the next generation, daughters are also in a vulnerable position to external threats.
- Black Tent (Qara Otaq in Azerbaijani Turkish) - is the yurt, where parents without children are guests, signifies poverty and deprivation. Childlessness is indicative of a futureless, finite, and constrained existence. In this context, the black color represents death. While the white tent ensures the continuation of both lineage and reputation, and the red tent secures the continuation of the lineage, it does not guarantee the perpetuation of reputation. On the other hand, the black tent represents the end of both, reputation and lineage.
- Khizir - in stories, heroes solve some obstacles with their intellects, while they overcome others with their physical strength. When heroes face difficulties, are unable to resolve their problems, and do not know how to overcome the obstacles and challenges they encounter, in short, when they succumb to helplessness and despair, there is always a wise figure, a shaman, a Khizr, coming to their aid. In shamanism and Alevism in Anatolia, it is often encountered with the name Khizr, and it can be said that the "spirit of nature" or that humans are created "from their own light" is present in these beliefs.
- Shadow (Kölgə in Azerbaijani Turkish) - It manifests itself as the hidden aspect of oneself lying in the depths of the psyche, often exposed to change and initiation. "The shadow is the opposing force that allows the hero to progress and become more competent in the process of individuation". Appearing as forty treacherous individuals in the form of shadow archetypes, in reality, it symbolizes the cunning sentiment Dirsə Khan feels towards his son, who is perceived as a threat. This sentiment is represented by resorting to deceit, speaking falsehoods, and ultimately ordering the killing of his son to protect his own interests. By avoiding questioning and easily sacrificing the son, whom he obtained as a gift through sacrificing animals and praying, Dirsə Khan, who has shielded himself from this sentiment, demonstrates his weakness. Here, the shadow prevails over the light, and Dirsə Khan, who is considered an "alp type," succumbs to his weakness.
- The Mother's Milk" (Ana Südü in Azerbaijani Turkish) and "Mountain Flower" (Dağ çiçəyi in Azerbaijani Turkish) archetypes belong to the primary ethnic-mental archetypes in Azerbaijani Turks archaic thought. In terms of mythological semantics, "The Mother's Milk" not only represents motherhood but also serves as an archetype for the associated maternal cult. On the other hand, "Mountain Flower" is a symbolic representation of the general nature cult, specifically encompassing mountain and plant cults within the context of the narrative.
