= List of many-eyed creatures in mythology and fiction =

Many-eyed creatures in mythology and fiction

This page lists many-eyed beings in mythology and fiction. The list is meant to include creatures that have multiple eyes on body or on head (or heads); for creatures who have multiple eyes due to having multiple heads, each having two eyes, see polycephaly in mythology.

== In mythology and religion ==
- Amun in Egyptian mythology (in some depictions).
- Argus Panoptes in Greek mythology.
- Azrael in Islam.
- Bes in Egyptian mythology (in some depictions).
- Dodomeki and Mokumokuren in Japanese folklore.
- Ophanim in Judaism and Christianity are entities who resemble wheels with multiple eyes.
- Lord Shiva in Hinduism.
- Osiris in Egyptian mythology (in some depictions).
- Seraphim in Judaism and Christianity.
- Tripura Sundari in Hinduism (in some depictions)
- Adi Parashakti in Hinduism (in some depictions)
- Indra in Hinduism (following his seduction of Ahalya).
- Durga or Gauri in Hinduism.
- Cuegle in Cantabrian mythology/folklore

== In fiction ==
=== Literature ===
- Andalites from the Animorphs series have two eyes on their faces and two on stalks.
- Baskania from the book Erec Rex.
- Blind Io from Discworld.
- Multiple characters from the Cthulhu Mythos:
  - The Elder Things
  - Shoggoth
  - Yith
- Eye-Boy from Marvel Comics is a mutant with 55 additional eyes gifting him a range of powers.

=== Films and television ===
- Angel of Death in Hellboy 2: The Golden Army, though it is based on Azrael.
- Beljoxa's Eye in Buffy the Vampire Slayer episode "Showtime"
- Black Beast of Argh (also known as Black Beast of Caerbannog) from Monty Python and the Holy Grail.
- Eye Guy from the Power Rangers series.
- The Guardian from Big Trouble in Little China.

=== Western animation ===
- Eye Guy from Ben 10 is an Opticoid, a humanoid alien who has eyes across his body, but none on his face.
- Gallaxhar from Monsters vs. Aliens is a tentacled alien who has four eyes.
- Henry J. Waternoose from Monsters, Inc..
- Several Gem fusions in Steven Universe have multiple eyes. This includes Garnet, who has three eyes that are usually hidden behind a visor.
- Tom Lucitor from Star vs. the Forces of Evil is a demon who has three eyes.
- Warren Ampersand from Adventure Time is an alien and the father of Jake the Dog who possesses five eyes.
- Nibbler from Futurama is a small alien who has three eyes, with the third being mounted on an eyestalk.
- Vaka-Waka, a Muncho mixel from Mixels.

=== Games ===
- Amygdala and Rom, the Vacuous Spider, both bosses from Bloodborne.
- Ardata Carmia from Hiveswap.
- Beholder and related monsters from Dungeons & Dragons.
- Muffet from Undertale.
- Frei from Hello Charlotte.

=== Anime and manga ===
- Hiei from Yu Yu Hakusho.
- Hyakume from GeGeGe no Kitarō
- Rachnera Arachnera from Monster Musume has six eyes, being part spider.
- Pai, a Sanjiyan Unkara from the manga 3×3 Eyes.
- Thousand-Eyes Idol from Yu-Gi-Oh!.
- Alucard's familiar, "Black hound of Baskerville" in Hellsing Ultimate.
- Claydol from the Pokémon franchise is a Pokémon who resembles a clay statue with red eyes in a ring around its head.
- Kokushibo, a character from Demon Slayer: Kimetsu no Yaiba, is a former Demon Slayer who transformed himself into a humanoid demon that possesses six eyes.
- Charlotte Pudding, a Human-Three Eye hybrid from One Piece.

== See also ==
- List of one-eyed creatures
- Multiocular O
