= Book of Dede Korkut =

Epic tales of the Oghuz Turkic people

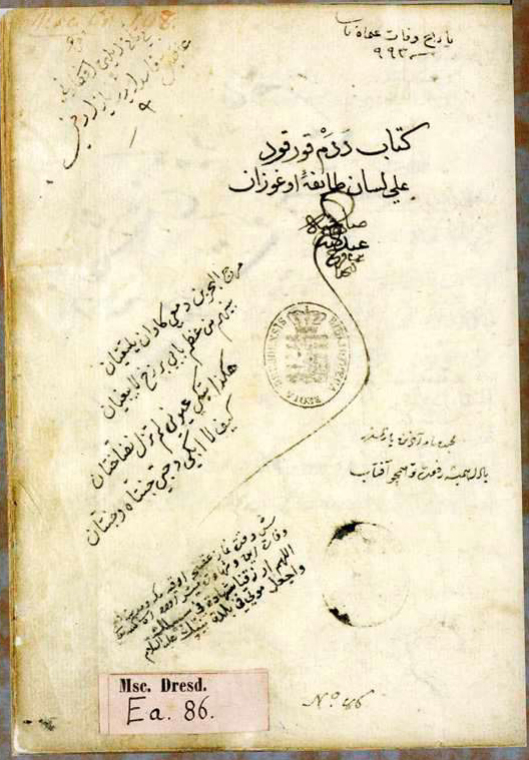
- Front page of the Dresden manuscript
- Original title: Dresden manuscript: Kitāb-ı Dedem Ḳorḳud Alā Lisān-ı Tāife-i Oġuzān (Book of my Grandfather Korkut according to the language of the tribe of the Oghuz); Vatican manuscript: Hikāyet-ı Oġuznāme-ı Kazan Beġ ve Gayrı (Story of Oguzname, Kazan Beg and the Others); Gonbad manuscript: Cild-i Duyyum-i Kitāb-i Türkmän (ä)lsānî (Second Volume of the Book of the Turkmens)
- Language: Oghuz Turkic
- Subject(s): The stories carry morals and values significant to the social lifestyle of the nomadic Turks.
- Genre: Epic poetry
- Publication date: c. 14th or 15th century

Heritage of Dede Qorqud/Korkyt Ata/Dede Korkut, epic culture, folk tales and music
- UNESCO Intangible Cultural Heritage
- Country: Azerbaijan, Kazakhstan, and Turkey
- Reference: 01399
- Region: Europe and North America

Inscription history
- Inscription: 2018 (13th session)
- List: Representative

The Book of Dede Korkut or Book of Korkut Ata (Azerbaijani: Kitabi-Dədə Qorqud, کتاب دده قورقود; Turkmen: Kitaby Dädem Gorkut; Turkish: Dede Korkut Kitabı) is the most famous among the dastans or epic stories of the Oghuz Turks. The stories carry morals and values significant to the social lifestyle of the nomadic Turkic peoples and their pre-Islamic beliefs. The book's mythic narrative is part of the cultural heritage of the peoples of Oghuz origin, mainly of Azerbaijan, Turkey and Turkmenistan. Only two manuscripts of the text, one in the Vatican and one in Dresden, Germany, were known before a third manuscript was discovered in a private collection in Gonbad-e Kavus, Iran, in 2018.

The epic tales of Dede Korkut are some of the best-known Turkic dastans from among a total of well over 1,000 recorded epics among the Turkic and Mongolic language families.

== Origin and synopsis of the epic ==
Dede Korkut is a heroic dastan, also known as the Oghuznama among the Oghuz, which starts in Central Asia, continues in Anatolia, and centers most of its action in the Caucasus. According to Barthold, "it is not possible to surmise that this dastan could have been written anywhere but in the Caucasus".

The Dede Korkut is the principal repository of ethnic identity, history, customs and the value systems of the Oghuz throughout history. It commemorates struggles for freedom when the Oghuz were a herding people although "it is clear that the stories were put into their present form at a time when the Turks of Oghuz descent no longer thought of themselves as Oghuz". From the mid-10th century onward, the term Oghuz was gradually supplanted among the Turks themselves by Turkoman. The process had been completed by the early 13th century. The Turcomans were those Turks, mostly but not exclusively Oghuz, who had embraced Islam and begun to lead a more sedentary life than their forefathers. In the 14th century, a federation of Turcoman tribesmen, the Aq Qoyunlu, established a confederation centered in eastern Turkey, Azerbaijan, Iraq and western Iran.

=== Contents ===
The twelve stories that comprise the bulk of the work were written down after the Turks converted to Islam, and the heroes are often portrayed as good Muslims while the villains are referred to as infidels, but there are also many references to the Turks' pre-Islamic magic. The character Dede Korkut, "Grandfather Korkut", is a widely renowned soothsayer and bard, and serves to link the stories together, and the thirteenth chapter of the book compiles sayings attributed to him.

In the dastans, Dede Korkut appears as the aksakal [literally 'white-beard,' the respected elder], the advisor or sage, solving the difficulties faced by tribal members. ... Among the population, respected aksakals are wise and know how to solve problems; among ashiks [bards] they are generally called dede [grandfather]. In the past, this term designated respected tribal elders, and now is used within families; in many localities of Azerbaijan, it replaces ata [ancestor or father].

The historian Rashid-al-Din Hamadani (d. 1318) says that Dede Korkut was a real person and lived for 295 years; that he appeared in the time of the Oghuz ruler Inal Syr Yavkuy Khan, by whom he was sent as ambassador to the Prophet; that he became Muslim; and that he advised the Great Khan of the Oghuz, attended the election of the Great Khan, and gave names to children.

The tales tell of warriors and battles and are likely grounded in the conflicts between the Oghuz and the Pechenegs and Kipchaks. Many story elements are familiar to those versed in the Western literary tradition. For example, the story of a monster named Tepegöz "One-Eye" bears enough resemblance to the encounter with the Cyclops in Homer's Odyssey that it is believed to have been influenced by the Greek epic or to have one common ancient Anatolian root. The book also describes in great detail the various sports activities of the ancient Turkic peoples:

Dede Korkut (1000–1300) clearly referred to certain physical activities and games. In Dede Korkut's description, the athletic skills of Turks, both men and women, were described to be "first-rate," especially in horse-riding, archery, cirit (javelin throw), wrestling and polo, which are considered Turkish national sports.

==== Synopses ====
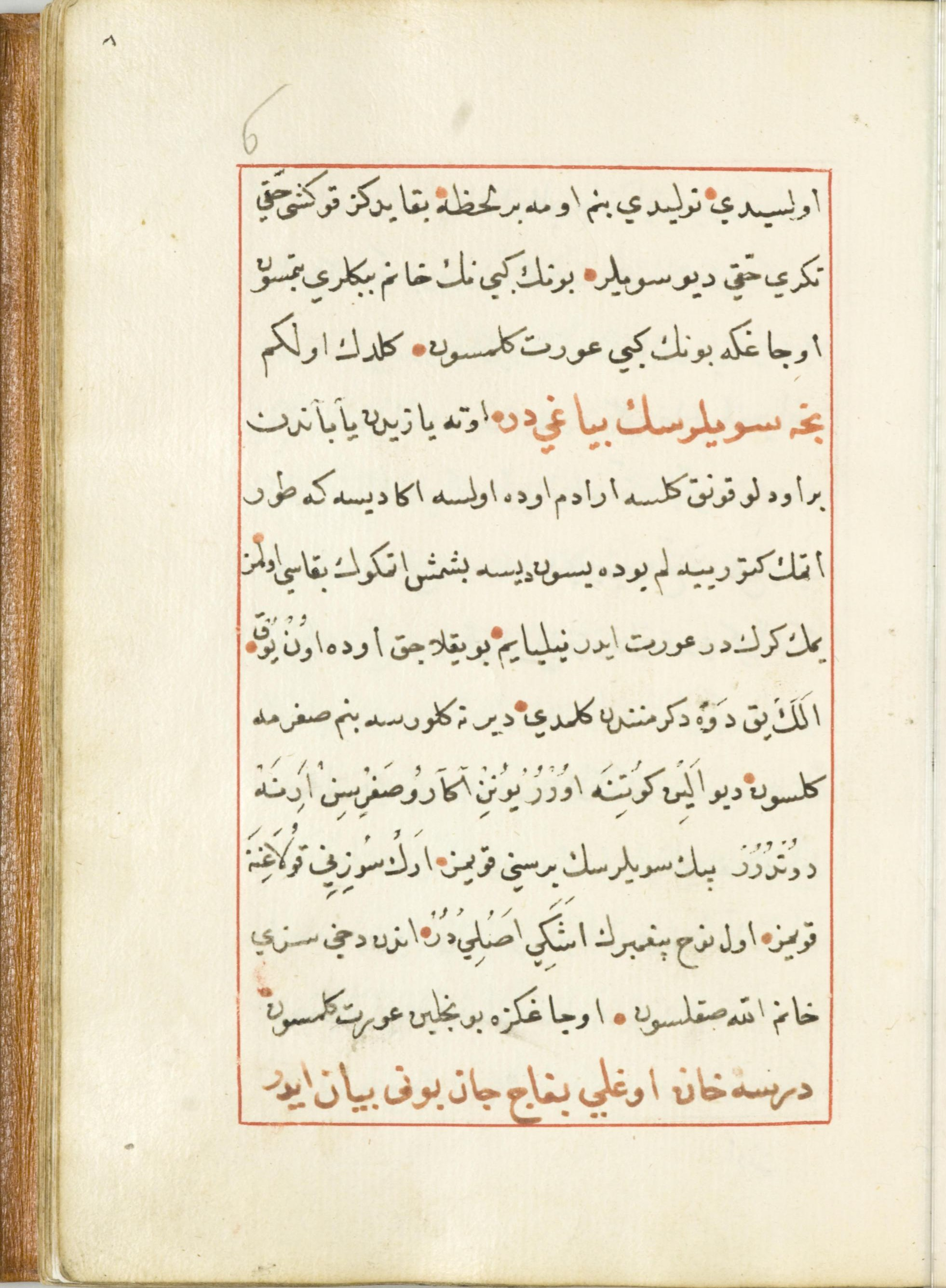
The beginning of the first chapter, "Boghach Khan Son of Dirse Khan", of the Dede Korkut, 16th-century Dresden manuscript

1. Boghach Khan Son of Dirse Khan: tells the story of the miraculous birth of Boghach Khan, how he grew up to become a mighty warrior and earned a princedom, how his father Dirse Khan was tricked by his own warriors into trying to kill him, how his mother (unnamed) saved his life, and how he rescued his father from the treacherous warriors; Korkut arrives at the celebration and creates the story;
2. How Salur Kazan's House was Pillaged: tells how the infidel (i.e., non-Muslim) Georgian King Shökli raided Salur Kazan's encampment while Kazan and his nobles were hunting, how Kazan and the heroic shepherd Karajuk teamed up to track down Shökli, how Kazan's wife Lady Burla and son Uruz showed quick-thinking and heroism in captivity, and how Kazan's men arrived to help Kazan defeat Shökli;
3. Bamsi Beyrek of the Grey Horse: tells how the young son of Prince Bay Büre proved his worth and earned the name Bamsi Beyrek, how he won the hand of Lady Chichek against the resistance of her brother Crazy Karchar, how he was kidnapped by King Shökli's men and held captive for 16 years, and how he escaped upon hearing that Lady Chichek was being given to another man and how he won her back; Korkut appears as an actor in the story, giving Beyrek his name and later helping him outwit Crazy Karchar;
4. How Prince Uruz Son of Prince Kazan was Taken Prisoner: tells how Salur Kazan realized that his son Uruz was sixteen but had never seen battle, how Kazan and Uruz were attacked by the infidels while on a hunt, how Uruz entered the fray and was taken captive, how Lady Burla reacted on realizing her son was in danger, how Kazan tracked down the infidels and how Uruz begged him to flee, and how Lady Burla and Kazan's men arrived and helped Kazan rescue Uruz; this story mentions three infidel kings: Shökli, Kara Tüken, and Bughachuk, who is beheaded;
5. Wild Dumrul Son of Dukha Koja: tells how Wild Dumrul offended God by challenging Azrael, how Dumrul realized his mistake and found favor with Allah on condition that someone agrees to die in his place, how Dumrul's parents refused to die in place but his wife agreed, how Dumrul asked Allah to spare his wife and how Allah granted them 140 years; Korkut commands that this story be kept alive by the bards;
6. Kan Turali Son of Kanli Koja: tells how Kan Turali won the heart and hand of infidel Princess Saljan of Trebizond by bare-handedly defeating a bull, a lion, and a camel, how the Princess's father changed his mind and sent 600 warriors to kill him, and how the Princess helped Kan Turali defeat her father's men; Korkut also appears in the story as the storyteller at the wedding;
7. Yigenek Son of Kazilik Koja: tells how Kazilik Koja is captured by the infidel King Direk of Arshuvan while trying to raid Düzmürd Castle on the Black Sea, how he was held 16 years, how his son Yigenek grew up not knowing his father was a captive, how Yigenek found out his father was alive and asked permission from Bayindir Khan to rescue him, and how Yigenek defeated King Direk after Bayindir's other men failed; Korkut shows up at the celebration;
8. How Basat Killed Tepegöz: tells how Basat was raised by a lioness and how Tepegöz was born of a human father and a peri mother, how the two boys were raised as brothers, how Tepegöz terrorized the Oghuz by demanding they continually provide young men and sheep for him to eat, how Basat was convinced by one of the Oghuz mothers to fight Tepegöz, and how Basat defeated Tepegöz in a fight; Korkut plays a role in this story of the mediator between Tepegöz and the Oghuz;
9. Emren Son of Begil: tells how Begil becomes warden of Georgia for Bayindir Khan, but is tempted to rebel after feeling slighted by the Khan; how he breaks his leg after being thrown from a horse while hunting; how Shökli learns of his injury and attempts to attack him; how Begil's son Emren takes his armor and leads Begil's men to defend him; how God answers Emren's prayer for strength and how Emren gets Shökli to convert to Islam; how Begil and Bayindir Khan are reconciled;
10. Segrek Son of Ushun Koja: tells how Ushun Koja's elder son, Egrek, was captured by the Black King near Julfa and thrown into the dungeon of Alinja Tower; how Ushon Koja's younger son, Segrek, grew up not knowing about his brother's captivity until he was taunted about it by some boys; how Ushon Koja and his wife tried to prevent Segrek from going to find Egrek by marrying him; how Segrek refused to lie with his wife until he found out his brother's fate; how Segrek finds his way to the Black King's castle and fends off several attacks by the Black King's men, but is eventually overtaken by sleep; how the Black King promises to release Egrek if he will take care of this mysterious assailant; how Egrek and Segrek recognize each other, defeat the Black King's men and return home;
11. How Salur Kazan was Taken Prisoner and How His Son Uruz Freed Him: tells how Salur Kazan was captured at Tomanin Castle in Trebizond; how he taunted the infidels and refused to praise them; how his son Uruz grew up not knowing about his father, and how he found out about his father's imprisonment; how Uruz led an army of nobles to rescue Salur Kazan; how they attacked the Ayasofia in Trebizond; how Salur was sent to protect the castle from the assailants but learned who they were and did not kill them; how he and his son were reunited, how they attacked the infidels, and how they returned home;
12. How the Outer Oghuz Rebelled against the Inner Oghuz and How Beyrek Died: How the Outer Oghuz rebel against Kazan Khan after feeling he had slighted them in favor of the Inner Oghuz; how Kazan's uncle Uruz, leading the rebels, tries to get his son-in-law Beyrek to join the rebellion, and how he kills Beyrek for refusing; how Beyrek is taken home, where he calls on Kazan to avenge him; how Kazan and his forces defeat Uruz, after which the surviving rebels surrender and reconcile with Kazan;
13. The Wisdom of Dede Korkut

== Language ==
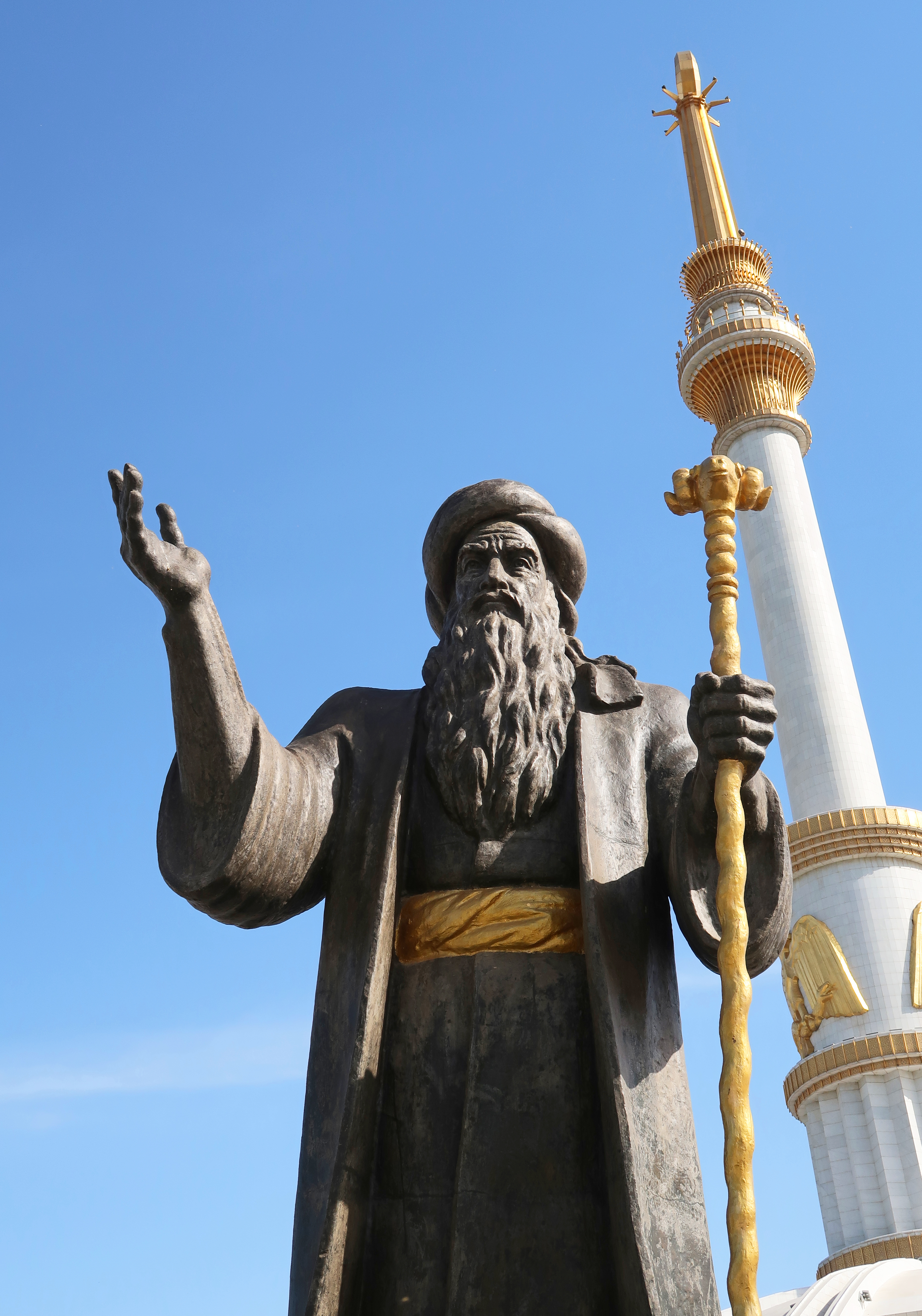
Gorkut Ata (Dede Korkut) Statue in Ashgabat, Turkmenistan.

The language of the Gonbad manuscript is of a mixed character and depicts vivid characteristics of the period of transition from later Old Oghuz Turkic to the Early Modern Turkic of Iranian Azerbaijan. However, there are also orthographical, lexical and grammatical structures peculiar to Chaghatai, which shows that the original work was written in the area between the Syr Darya and Anatolia, later rewritten in Safavid Iran in the second half of the 16th century and again in Qajar Iran in the second half of the 18th century. However, the manuscript also boasts a couple of Persian word groups, such as Dāvūd-ı nebī (Prophet Dawud), Şāh-ı merdān ("shah of the valiant", Ali), taḫt-ı Mıṣır (the throne of Egypt) and others.

The following sentences are a few of many sayings that appear in the Gonbad manuscript:

Text in original Oghuz Turkic language:
Allāhına güveneŋ yumruḳ ursa ḳara daġlar yıḫar.
Üstin ala bedirli ay gelende sıçramaḳa ḥamlelenür.
Tekebbürlik eyleyeni Taŋrı sevmez.
Kara saçuŋ dolaşmışını daraġ yazar.
Eger erdür eger ḫatun bu dünyāda nāmūslı ġayretli ḳoççaḳ gerek.
Yapa yapa ḳarlar yaġsa yaza ḳalmaz.
Ecel vaʿde ėrmeyince kimse ölmez.
Aġlamaġıla nesne mi olur?

English translation:
Those who trust in God can destroy even the black mountains if they punch them.
When the light of the full moon appears above, [the pied violent tiger] makes a move to leap.
God disdains the proud.
The comb can disentangle tangled black hair.
Whether man or woman, in this world one must have an honest and zealous heart.
If the flaky snow falls, it will not stay in the summer.
If one's dying day doesn't come, that person will not die.
What can be achieved by crying?

== Manuscript tradition ==
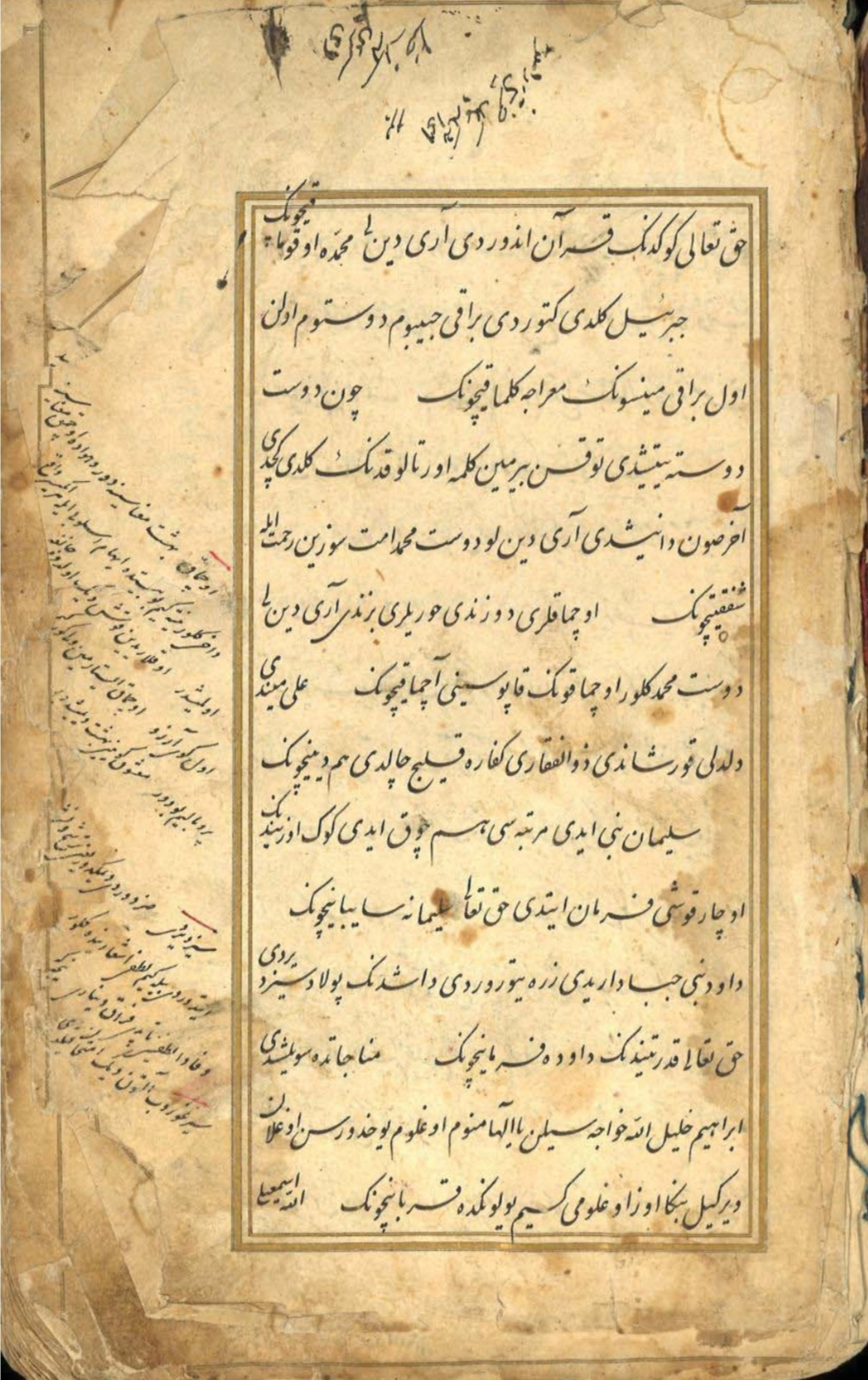
The opening of the Book of Dede Korkut in the Gonbad-e Kavus manuscript, Iran.

Since the early 18th century, the Book of Dede Korkut has been translated into French, English, Russian and Hungarian. However, it was not until it caught the attention of H.F. Von Diez, who published a partial German translation of Dede Korkut in 1815, based on a manuscript found in the Royal Library of Dresden, that Dede Korkut became widely known to the West. The only other manuscript of Dede Korkut was discovered in 1950 by Ettore Rossi in the Vatican Library.

Until Dede Korkut was transcribed on paper, the events depicted therein survived in oral tradition, at least from the 9th and the 10th centuries. The "Bamsi Beyrek" chapter of Dede Korkut preserves almost verbatim the immensely popular Central Asian dastan Alpamysh, dating from an even earlier time. The stories were written in prose, but peppered with poetic passages. Recent research by Turkish and Turkmen scholars revealed, that the Turkmen variant of the Book of Dede Korkut contains sixteen stories, which have been transcribed and published in 1998.

In 2018, the Gonbad manuscript was discovered. The first leaf of the Gonbad manuscript is missing. For that reason, it is not known how the name of the manuscript was recorded in writing.

The language of the Gonbad manuscript is of a mixed character and depicts vivid characteristics of the period of transition from later Old Oghuz Turkic to Early Modern Turkic of Iranian Azerbaijan. However, there are also orthographical, lexical, and grammatical structures peculiar to Chaghatai, which shows that the original work was written in the area between the Syr Darya and Anatolia, and later rewritten in Safavid Iran in the second half of the 16th century. It was later copied again in the same area in the second half of the 18th century during the Qajar dynasty.

=== Dating the composition ===
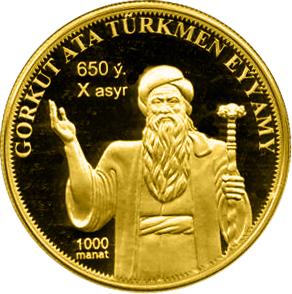
Depiction of Gorkut Ata (Dede Korkut) on a 2006 coin of Turkmenistan

The work originated as a series of epics orally told and transferred over the generations before being published in book form. There are numerous versions collected of the stories. It is thought that the first versions were in natural verse since Turkish is an agglutinative language but that they gradually transformed into combinations of verse and prose as the Islamic elements affected the narrative over time.

Various dates have been proposed for the first written copies. Geoffrey Lewis dates it fairly early in the 15th century, with two layers of text: a substratum of older oral traditions related to conflicts between the Oghuz and the Pechenegs and Kipchaks and an outer covering of references to the 14th-century campaigns of the Aq Qoyunlu. Cemal Kafadar agrees that it was no earlier than the 15th century since "the author is buttering up both the Akkoyunlu and the Ottoman rulers". (Note: "It was not earlier than the 15th century. Based on the fact that the author butters up both the Akkoyunlu and Ottoman rulers, it has been suggested that the composition belongs to someone living in the undefined border region lands between the two states during the reign of Uzun Hassan (1466–78). G. Lewis on the hand dates the composition 'fairly early in the 15th century at least'.")

However, in his history of the Ottoman Empire, Stanford J. Shaw (1977), dates it in the 14th century. (Note: "The greatest folk product of the 14th century was the prose collection of Dede Korkut, the oldest surviving examples of Oghuz Turkmen epic. Dede Korkut relates the struggles of Turkmens with the Georgians and Abkhaza Circassians in the Caucasia as well as with the Byzantine Empire of Trebizond, adding stories of relationships and conflicts within Turkomen tribes.") Professor Michael E. Meeker argues for two dates and says that the versions of the stories we have today originated as folk stories and songs no earlier than the 13th century and were written down no later than the early the 15th century. At least one of the stories (Chapter 8) existed in writing in the early 14th century, from an unpublished Arabic history, ibn al-Dawadari's Durar al-Tijan, written in the Mamluk Sultanate sometime between 1309 and 1340.

A precise determination is impossible to come by due to the nomadic lifestyle of the early Turkic peoples, in which epics such as that of Dede Korkut passed from generation to generation in an oral form. This is especially true of an epic book such as this, which is a product of a long series of narrators, any of whom could have made alterations and additions, right down to the two 16th-century scribes who authored the oldest extant manuscripts. The majority of scholars of ancient Turkic epics and folk tales, such as Russian-Soviet academician Vasily Bartold and British scholar Geoffrey Lewis, believed that the Dede Korkut text "exhibits a number of features characteristic of Azeri, the Turkish dialect of Azerbaijan".

== Soviet treatment ==
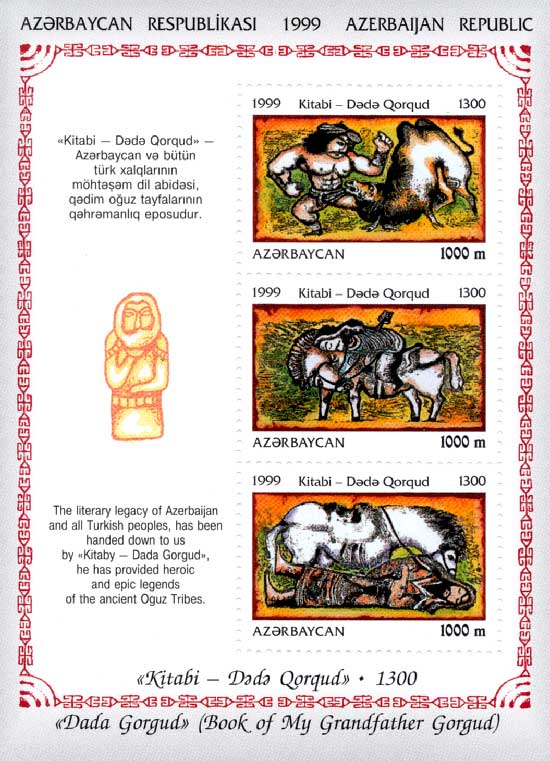
1999 Stamps of Azerbaijan commemorating the 1300th Anniversary of Kitab-i Dede Gorgud

The majority of the Turkic peoples and lands described in the Book of Dede Korkut were part of the Soviet Union from 1920 until 1991, and thus most of the research and interest originated there. The attitude towards the Book of Dede Korkut and other dastans related to the Turkic peoples was initially neutral.

The Turkish historian Hasan Bülent Paksoy argues that after Joseph Stalin solidified his grip on power in the Soviet Union, especially in the early 1950s, a taboo on Turkology was firmly established. He observed that the first full-text Russian edition of the Book of Dede Korkut, by Azerbaijani academicians Hamid Arasly and M.G.Tahmasib and based on the Barthold translation of the 1920s, was published on a limited basis only in 1939 and again in 1950. He asserts, "Turkic scholars and literati (who raised the same issues) were lost to the Stalinist 'liquidations' or to the 'ideological assault' waged on all dastans in 1950–52." According to Paksoy, this taboo of the early 1950s was also expressed in the "Trial of Alpamysh" (1952–1957), when "all dastans of Central Asia were officially condemned by the Soviet state apparatus".

Soviet authorities criticized Dede Korkut for promoting bourgeois nationalism. In a 1951 speech delivered at the 18th Congress of the Azerbaijani Communist Party, Azerbaijani communist leader Mir Jafar Baghirov advocated expunging the epic from Azerbaijani literature, calling it a "harmful" and "antipopular book" that "is shot through with the poison of nationalism, chiefly against the Georgian and Armenian brother-peoples."

Nevertheless, the publication of dastans did not wholly cease during that period, as editions of Alpamysh were published in 1957, 1958 and 1961, as they had been in 1939, 1941, and 1949; the entry on dastans in the second edition of the Great Soviet Encyclopedia (volume 13, 1952) does not contain any "condemnation" either. Despite the liberalization of the political climate after the denunciation of Stalinism by Nikita Khrushchev in February 1956, the same "Barthold" edition of the Book of Dede Korkut was re-published only in 1962 and in 1977. Problems persisted until perestroika, when the last full edition in Azerbaijani was sent for publication on July 11, 1985 but only received permission for printing on February 2, 1988.

== Cultural legacy ==
A 1975 Azeri film, Dada Gorgud, is based on the epic.

In 1998, Azerbaijan and UNESCO nominated, and in 2000 celebrated, the "One thousand three hundredth anniversary of the epic poem Kitab-i Dede Qorqud".

In 1999 the National Bank of Azerbaijan minted gold and silver commemorative coins for the 1,300th anniversary of the epic. The epic culture, folk tales and music of Dede Qorqud has been included in the Representative List of the Intangible Cultural Heritage of Humanity of UNESCO in November 2018.

== See also ==
- Irk Bitig
- Dīwān Lughāt al-Turk
- Turkic mythology
