= Hitotsume-nyūdō =

Yōkai

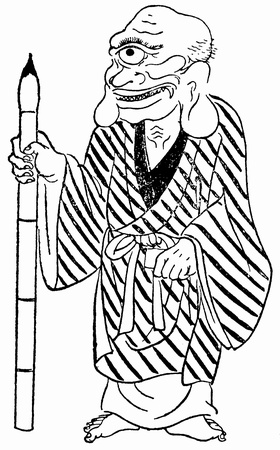
The hitotsume-nyūdō of a fox from the "Tango no Kuni Henka Monogatari"

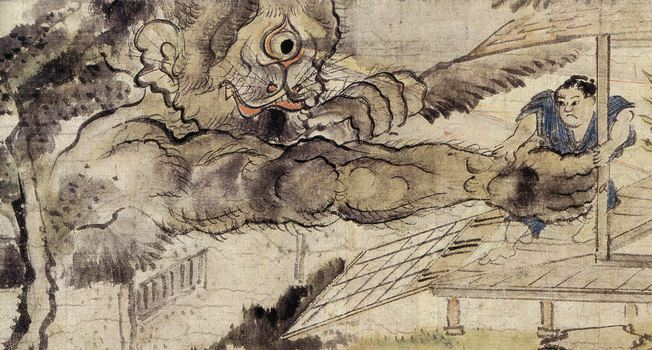
The hitotsume-nyūdō that appeared in "Inō Mononoke Roku"

Hitotsume-nyūdō is a yōkai of Japan that has the appearance of an ōnyūdō that has only one eye.

== Summary ==
They can be seen in the legends and folklore of various places, and like the mikoshi-nyūdō, there are some that expand and contract their height. In Kyoto, it is said that their true identity is that of a fox (kitsune). Also, a hitotsume-nyūdō appears in the kaidan Inō Mononoke Roku from the Edo period, and there was a picture depicting it attempting to capture the main character Heitarō (refer to image), but this one is a tanuki that has shapeshifted.

In Hidaka District, Wakayama Prefecture, there is a yōkai tale as follows. A young fellow was on the way from Kamishiga to Ena (now Yura, Hidaka District), he came across a splendid procession. It didn't appear to be a feudal lord or a marriage, but when he climbed a tree to spectate, the procession stopped at the base of the tree, and from an awfully large palanquin, a large man with one eye about 1 to tall appeared, climbed the tree, and attempted to attack the young fellow. When the young fellow was absorbed and was slashed at with a sword, it is said that the old man and the procession all disappeared.

This hitotsume-nyūdō and the hitotsume-kozō has the appearance of a nyūdō (monk), but there is a theory that it comes from the yōkai called "ichigan hitoashi hōshi (一眼一足法師, one-eyed one-footed hōshi)" from Mount Hiei. As its name implies, it is a yōkai or yūrei with the appearance of a monk with one eye and one foot, and it is said that when a monk idles on his training on Mount Hiei, he would be admonished by being stared at with one eye, and monks that are terribly lazy would be driven out of the mountain. This hōshi has been specified to be what the 18th Tendaizasu, Ryōgen (or his best pupil, the 19th Tendaizasu Jinzen) turned into, and it is believed that Ryōgen, who judged the monks on strict precepts, lamented at how the monks became secularized after his death, became thus a yōkai and admonished the monks. Nowadays at Enryaku-ji on Mount Hiei, there remains a picture of this hōshi in Sōjibō, a small temple where monks in training live.

== See also ==
- List of legendary creatures from Japan
