= Hitotsume-kozō =

Yōkai

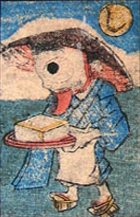
The card "Boy with His Tongue Out Licking Tōfu (した出し小僧のとうふなめ)" from yōkai karuta

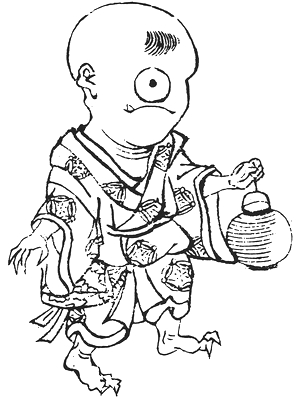
A hitotsume-kozō from the kibyōshi "Bakemono Chakutōchō" by Masayoshi Kitao.

Hitotsume-kozō (一つ目小僧) are a Yōkai (supernatural apparition) of Japan that take on the appearance of a bald-headed child with one eye in the center of its forehead similar to a cyclops.

== Summary ==
They generally do not cause any injury, are said to suddenly appear and surprise people, and are a comparatively harmless type of yōkai. By that, it can be said that their behavior could also be understood in terms of the karakasa-obake. Perhaps because they don't perform bad deeds, when they are depicted in pictures, they are often depicted cutely, or in a humorous design.

In yōkai karuta, hitotsume-kozō are depicted carrying tōfu, but according to the yōkai researcher Katsumi Tada, since "mametsubu (豆粒, bean pieces)" leads to "mametsu (魔滅, sound health)", hitotsume-kozō are supposed to dislike beans, but somehow before anyone knew it the hitotsume-kozō switched to having tōfu (made from soybeans) as its favorite food. Additionally, this said to be related to the tōfu-kozō.

They take on the appearance of a kozō (a monk in training), but there is also the theory that they come from the yōkai from Mount Hiei, the ichigan hitoashi hōshi (一眼一足法師, one-eyed one-footed Buddhist priest) said to be what the 18th Tendaizasu, Ryōgen turned into. See also Hitotsume-nyūdō.

== In classics ==
They can frequently be seen in kaidan, essays, and modern folkloristics material, but the story from "Kaidanoi no Tsue (怪談老の杖)" by Tōsaku Ikō is especially well-known. In Yotsuya, Edo, there lived a man named Ojima Yakiemon (小嶋弥喜右衛門), and headed towards the estate of the samurai family Asanuno for business, and when he waited in the room, a kozō about ten years of age appeared, and rolled up and rolled down the hanging scroll in the tokonoma over and over. When Yakiemon warned him about playing a prank, the kozō said "shut up" while turning around, and there was only one eye on his face. Yakiemon raised a shriek and fell down, and was sent back to his home by the people of the estate who were surprised by his voice. Afterward, according to the people of the estate, this kind of strange occurrence happens about four or five times each year, but it doesn't particularly do anything bad. Even though Yakiemon slept for about 20 days, he returned to being as robust as he was before.

It is said that hitotsume-kozō appear more frequently outside than inside. According to the "Aizu Kaidan Shū (会津怪談集)", near the Honshi no Chō (本四ノ丁) in Aizuwakamatsu, a girl met a child who was eight or nine years of age who asked "onee-san, do you money?" and upon answering "I want," the child face had only one eye, and the girl was glared at by that one eye fainted right there. Also, in the "Okayama no Kaidan", at Kamimomiimaidani, Kumenan, Kume District, Okayama Prefecture, there was a hill road called Hitokuchizaka (一口坂, "one mouth hill"), and in the past, when one walks that path at night, a bright blue light together with a hitotsume-kozō would appear, and those who are unable to stand due to surprise/fear would be licked by one mouthful of a long tongue, and this would be where the name Hitokuchizaka came from.

In yōkai depictions from the Edo period such as the Hyakkai Zukan, the "Bakemono Zukushi", and the "Bakemono Emaki", it was depicted under the name Mehitotsu-bō (目一つ坊). Also, in Oshu, they are called "hitotsu managu."

Also in rakugo, people with one eye (including children) would appear, and in the program "Ichigankoku (一眼国, "One Eyed Country")", it told of how a charlatan heard about a one-eyed person witnessed about 120 or 130 ri north of Edo on an empty field. He went out to capture one to show as an exhibit for the sake of profit. He found a one-eyed child, and when he attempted to take him away, there was a big uproar and he was surrounded by a great number of people who captured him. All of the people were one-eyed, and it ended with "how strange he is, he has two eyes", and "quickly, let's put him on exhibit" (furthermore, geographically, 120 ri north of Edo would be about 470 kilometers, which would be the Iwate or Akita Prefecture).

== In folk religion ==
In the Kantō region, there is the legend that on the night of Kotoyōka (事八日), the eighth day on the second month and the eighth day of the 12th month in the lunisolar calendar, they would come from mountain villages together with a mikaribaba, and perform the custom of putting a bamboo basket in front of their house in order to drive it away. Also, depending on the region, hiiragi are used to pierce baskets, but this is what "to stab one eye" means in those places. On Kotoyōka, in the past there were many regions that people would not do their work and stay confined in their homes, but sometimes, this ritual of seclusion in the house was interpreted as staying in the home since monsters would appear; there is also a theory that these monsters are the hitotsume-kozō and the mikaribaba.

Also in the legends of the Kantō region, hitotsume-kozō would go around houses carrying a notebook on Kotoyōka and would investigate houses that had bad door fastenings or bad manners, and determine their fortune, or report it to the yakubyōgami and bring about misfortune. On this occasion, on the eighth day of the 12th month, the hitotsume-kozō would record in a notebook the errors of each house and temporarily hand it to the dōsojin, and since they would be retrieving it on the eighth day of the second month, and as a practice to burn away the notebook, in Seya-ku, Yokohama, Kanagawa Prefecture, they would make a temporary shrine to the dōsojin and on the 14th day of the first month, burn it in dondoyaki. In Izu region in Shizuoka Prefecture, on the 15th day of the first month, there is the custom of burning a statue of a dōsojin in a fire in the dōsojin festival. With this, the hitotsume-kozō who was supposed to retrieve the notebook from the dōsojin on the eighth day of the second month would no longer be there, thus evading misfortune.

=== Atypical gods (kami) ===
Kunio Yanagita, a great authority on folkloristics, based on the thought that "yōkai are gods (kami) that have come to ruin", it has been explained that hitotsume-kozō are fallen mountain gods. There are several regions that have the legend that "mountain gods are cross-eyed (strabismus)", and since "has one eye" was a common way to say "cross-eyed", this is also originated from the divine spirits of the mountain. Also, there are hints that there existed people who lost a leg and an eye as a sacrifice in old rituals, and according to hunters and lumberjacks, in a legend related to nature gods deified in the mountains, one can catch a glimpse of atypical gods that took on an appearance with one eye and one foot. Other than this, since, among those who were employed in smelting iron in a tatara there were many people who lost one eye, there is the theory that it is related to one-eyed god, Ame no Mahitotsu no Kami that people employed at iron smelting have put their faith into.

== Cyclopia ==
There is an inherited deformity called cyclopia. When the mother is deficient in Vitamin A or other nutrients, the cerebrum is unable to divide to the left and right, and accompanying this there is also only one eyeball. More than just abnormalities with the brain, nerves, or respiratory system, it is a condition that results in death in the womb before even birth. Vitamin A is, other than green vegetables, also contained in many animal foods, and in Japan, which did not have much of a culture in eating meat, it might not have been strange to be deficient in Vitamin A. With this background, since hitotsume-kozō have the appearance of a child and the clothing of a young priest, it is thought that babies born with one eye were called this, which is where it started.

In Zama, Kanagawa Prefecture, in 1932 (Showa 7), a skull with only one eye socket was dug up from the cemetery inside the city, and it was presumed to have been the result of someone who was attacked by wild dogs after collapsing, and a "Hitotsume-kozō Jizō" was constructed as a memorial for this, and afterwards people connected it with the legend of hitotsume-kozō and conveyed between people. There is also the viewpoint that the owner of the skull had cyclopia.

== See also ==
- Cyclopes
- List of legendary creatures from Japan
