= Gershon ben Eliezer Yiddels =

Gershon ben Eliezer ha-Levi Yiddels of Prague (Hebrew: גרשון בן אליעזר הלוי יידלש מפראג, romanized: Gershon ben Eliʻezer ha-Levi Yidelsh mi-Prag; fl. 17th century) (Note: Variants of his name include Edels, Jidls, Yidelsh, Yiddls, and Yidls.) was a possibly fictitious Jewish travel writer.

He was the author of the Yiddish travelogue Gelilot Erets Yisra’el ('Regions of the Land of Israel'), containing a fantastical account of his travels to the Holy Land around 1624, by way of Salonica, Alexandria, Mecca, and Jiddah. In his account, he claims to have travelled to countries on the shores of the river Sambation and to the states of Prester John. He recounts having encountered three-eyed beasts with five feet, headless living men, fire-breathing birds, and other strange beings.

The work contains an approbation by Rabbi Joel Sarkes of Cracow, leading Adolf Asher to suggest that Sarkes never actually read its more fantastical elements.

The first edition, presumably published in Lublin in 1635, was publicly burned in Warsaw by order of the Jesuits. Subsequent editions of the work were published in Fürth (1691), Amsterdam (1705), and Prague (1824). It was also printed alongside the Ma'aseh Buch in Amsterdam in 1723. A Hebrew translation, titled ʼIggeret ha-kodesh ('Sacred Epistles'), went through multiple editions.
