= Camelot 30K =

1993 novel by Robert L. Forward

- Cover of the first edition
- Author: Robert L. Forward
- Language: English
- Genre: Science fiction
- Publisher: Tor Books
- Publication date: September 1993
- Publication place: United States
- Media type: Print (hardback & paperback)
- Pages: 308
- ISBN: 0-312-85215-0
- OCLC: 28332440
- Dewey Decimal: 813/.54 20
- LC Class: PS3556.O754 C36 1993

Camelot 30K is a hard science fiction novel written by the United States physicist Robert L. Forward. It was published in 1993 by Tor Books. The story mainly deals with the concept of human contact and interaction with a kingdom of intelligent alien life that dwells on a frozen world where the ambient temperature is only 30 K or −240 °C (hence the title of the book). In Camelot 30K, Forward uses exotic low-temperature chemistry to explain the aliens' unique biology and anatomy.

== Plot summary ==
In 2009, humans make contact with their first extraterrestrials. The signal comes from beyond Neptune and even Pluto, on 1999 ZX, a celestial body between comet and planet in size, out in the Kuiper belt at 35 AU from the Sun. Twenty years later they send a scientific team to this small, ice-bound planetoid in the farthest reaches of the Solar System in the Oort cloud.

The dark planetoid can be described as cold and strange. There is a thin hydrogen atmosphere, almost vacuum, and the average temperature is around 30 K (−243 °C; −406 °F) where only hydrogen, helium, and neon are gaseous in state and nearly everything else is a solid. Despite the harsh conditions of the planetoid, life manages to thrive: the keracks, which are no bigger than a few centimeters in length resemble "large one-eyed prawns dressed in elaborate clothing". They, despite their small size, have built small cities and developed a complex society on their planetoid which they dubbed "Ice". They have a collectivistic hive-like society with a rich culture suggesting that of England in the time of King Arthur.

The human visitors' first contact is the female kerack Merlene, wizard of the kerack city of Camalor. The humans themselves, being too hot and large, are unsuited for direct contact with the natives on this chilly world. So, instead, they have built "telebots" through which they can communicate with Merlene and the other keracks.

Merlene develops a fondness for conversing with the humans and eventually the humans and the keracks get to learn much about each other's worlds and cultures. The humans also teach Merlene more about science and technology which would hopefully advance the kerack race. The human scientists also uncover mysteries about the energy source of the keracks, who secrete an internal pellet of uranium and moderate its decay with a boron-rich carapace to provide internal warmth. Whenever a kerack dies its pellet is taken to be stockpiled by the colony's queen. The scientists discover the tragic conclusion of the kerack life cycle almost too late to save Merlene; when a kerack colony accumulated a large enough stockpile the queen would instinctively arrange it in such a way as to trigger a nuclear explosion, blasting kerack spores off of the Kuiper belt object to colonize other objects in the belt.

Since the kerack colony is exploded in the process no living kerack had known of their fate. The book concludes with Merlene going traveling to warn other colonies of the consequences of their expanding stockpiles.

== 1999 ZX naming ==
Forward created an impossible name in naming his minor planet. As minor planet provisional designations shows, a name of the form "1999 ZX" is not possible.
