= Pseudo-Epiphanius =

Pseudo-Epiphanius is the name given to an anonymous eighth-century Christian author of a selection of legends about the lives of the twelve apostles.
