= Jeremiah 35 =

Book of Jeremiah, chapter 35

- ← chapter 34 chapter 36 →
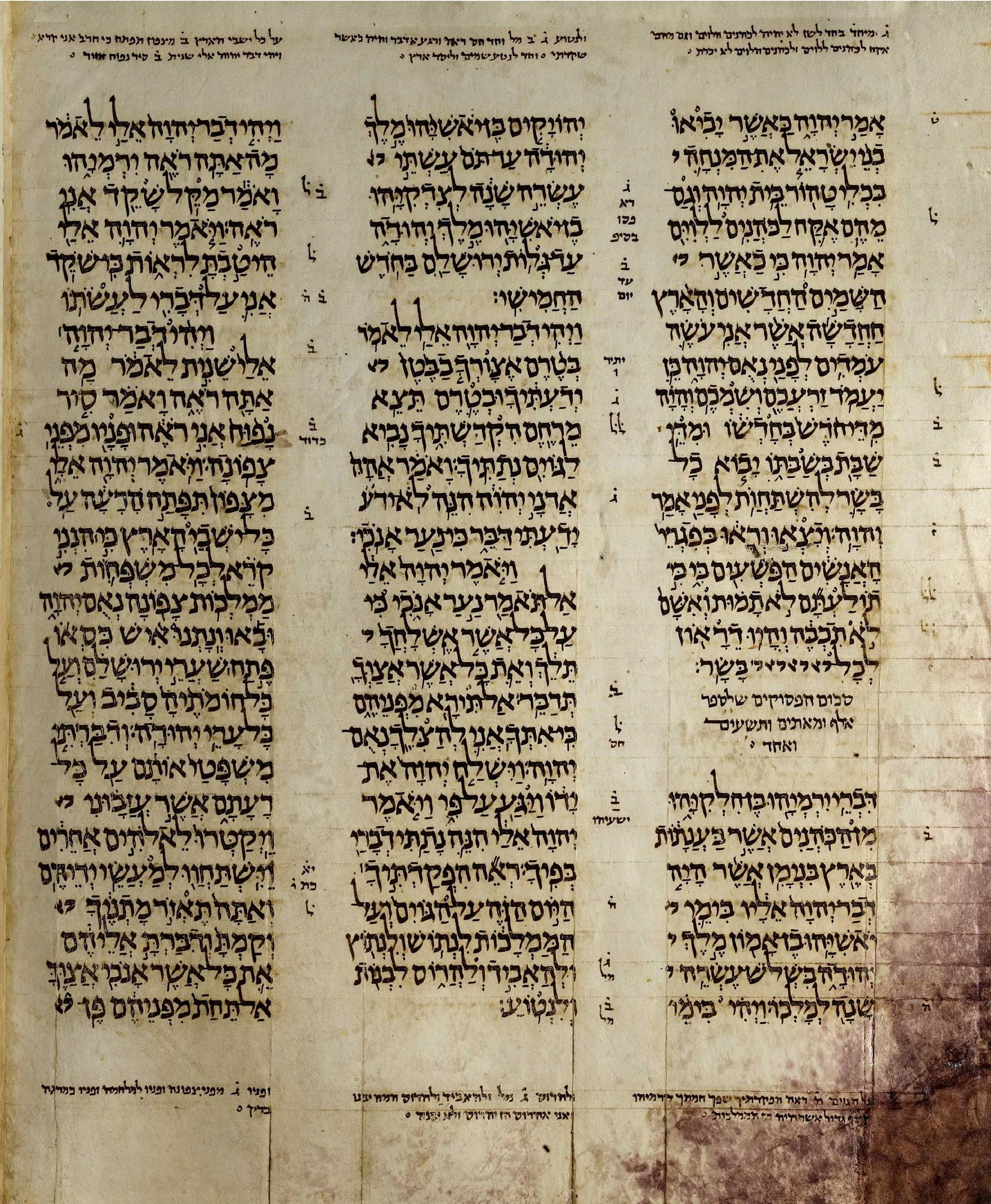
- A high resolution scan of the Aleppo Codex showing the Book of Jeremiah (the sixth book in Nevi'im).
- Book: Book of Jeremiah
- Hebrew Bible part: Nevi'im
- Order in the Hebrew part: 6
- Category: Latter Prophets
- Christian Bible part: Old Testament
- Order in the Christian part: 24

Jeremiah 35 is the thirty-fifth chapter of the Book of Jeremiah in the Hebrew Bible or the Old Testament of the Christian Bible. It is numbered as Jeremiah 42 in the Septuagint. This book contains prophecies attributed to the prophet Jeremiah, and is one of the Books of the Prophets. This chapter records the meeting of Jeremiah with the Rechabites, a nomadic clan, in which the prophet "contrast[s] their faithfulness to the commands of a dead ancestor with the faithlessness of the people of Judah to the commands of a living God".

== Text ==
The original text was written in Hebrew. This chapter is divided into 19 verses.

=== Textual witnesses ===
Some early manuscripts containing the text of this chapter in Hebrew are of the Masoretic Text tradition, which includes the Codex Cairensis (895), the Petersburg Codex of the Prophets (916), Aleppo Codex (10th century), Codex Leningradensis (1008).

There is also a translation into Koine Greek known as the Septuagint, made in the last few centuries BCE. Extant ancient manuscripts of the Septuagint version include Codex Vaticanus (B; $\mathfrak{G}$^{B}; 4th century), Codex Sinaiticus (S; BHK: $\mathfrak{G}$^{S}; 4th century), Codex Alexandrinus (A; $\mathfrak{G}$^{A}; 5th century) and Codex Marchalianus (Q; $\mathfrak{G}$^{Q}; 6th century).

=== Verse numbering ===
The order of chapters and verses of the Book of Jeremiah in the English Bibles, Masoretic Text (Hebrew), and Vulgate (Latin), in some places differs from that in Septuagint (LXX, the Greek Bible used in the Eastern Orthodox Church and others) according to Rahlfs or Brenton. The following table is taken with minor adjustments from Brenton's Septuagint, page 971.

The order of Computer Assisted Tools for Septuagint/Scriptural Study (CATSS) based on Alfred Rahlfs' Septuaginta (1935), differs in some details from Joseph Ziegler's critical edition (1957) in Göttingen LXX. Swete's Introduction mostly agrees with Rahlfs' edition (=CATSS).

Hebrew, Vulgate, English	Rahlfs' LXX (CATSS)
35:1-19	42:1-19
28:1-17	35:1-17

== Parashot ==
The parashah sections listed here are based on the Aleppo Codex. Jeremiah 35 contains the "Fourteenth prophecy" in the section of Prophecies interwoven with narratives about the prophet's life (Jeremiah 26-45). {P}: open parashah.

{P} 35:1-11 {P} 35:12-19 {P}

== The obedience of the Rechabites (35:1–11) ==
This chapter (and also chapter 36) is out of the chronological order of chapter 32-34 and 37-44, as it records the events during the reign of king Jehoiakim (609-598 BC). According to Weippert, "the phrases found in the chapter are characteristic of Jeremiah." Huey maintains that it is not "misplaced by accident or through a redactor's ignorance of the chronology of events", but perhaps to "emphasis that Judah's disobedience ... had begun much earlier than the closing years of Zedekiah's reign." This section provides an illustration contrasting the covenant infidelity of Israel against God as the Father of the nation (Jeremiah 34; 35:12–17) and the fidelity of the Rechabites to the commandments of their progenitor. This is another one of the symbolic acts in Jeremiah that have significance for the message of the book (cf. Jeremiah 13, 19).

When Egyptians decided to fight the Babylonians in Palestine, Nebuchadnezzar temporarily lifted the siege on Jerusalem, sending a raiding troops to attack other areas in Judah instead (660-598 SM; cf. verse 11; Jeremiah 44:5; 2 Kings 24:1–2), which drove the Rechabites, among the people living in the countryside, to Jerusalem (or other fortified cities) for safety during that period. Calmet suggests that "it was not till the latter end of Jehoiakim’s reign that the Rechabites were driven into the city".

=== Verse 1 ===
The word which came to Jeremiah from the Lord in the days of Jehoiakim the son of Josiah, king of Judah, saying

The introductory statement here shows that this incident is earlier than those in Jeremiah 32–34, which all took place in the reign of Zedekiah.

- "The days of Jehoiakim": Jehoiakim's reign was from 609/608 BCE until 598 BCE, then after a brief reign of Jehoiakim's son, Jehoiachin (three months in 598/597 BCE), Zedekiah, Jehoiakim's brother, ruled from 597 BCE until the kingdom of Judah fell in 587/586 BCE.

=== Verse 11 ===
[The Rechabites said to Jeremiah:] "But it came to pass, when Nebuchadrezzar king of Babylon came up into the land, that we said, Come, and let us go to Jerusalem for fear of the army of the Chaldeans, and for fear of the army of the Syrians: so we dwell at Jerusalem."

- "The army of the Chaldeans": from Hebrew: חיל הכשדים, khêl ha-kaś-dîm; some Bible versions render it as "the Babylonian(s)". The "Chaldeans" were a group of people from southern Babylon where Nebuchadnezzar came from. The book of Jeremiah regularly calls the Babylonians as the Chaldeans, whereas Jeremiah's contemporary, Ezekiel, uses both terms.

== Judah rebuked (35:12–19) ==
=== Verse 18 ===
And Jeremiah said to the house of the Rechabites, “Thus says the Lord of hosts, the God of Israel: ‘Because you have obeyed the commandment of Jonadab your father, and kept all his precepts and done according to all that he commanded you’”

- "The house of the Rechabites": A close knit descendants of the Kenites (Judges 1:16; 1 Chronicles 2:55) known from the story of Jehonadab the son of Rechab, who helped Jehu (reigning 842-814 BC) purging the Baal prophets from Samaria (2 Kings 10:15–28). The Rechabites lived as nomads, rejecting all forms of urban and agrarian life, and refused to drink wine or strong drink and would not cultivate vineyards nor plant any other crops. The complete obedience of the Rechabites is "outlined in a triad of verbs: obeyed ... kept ... done". Rabbi Halafta (1st–2nd centuries) was a descendant of the Rechabites. In 1839 the Reverend Joseph Wolff found in Yemen, near Sana'a, a tribe claiming to be descendants of Jehonadab; and in the late nineteenth century a Bedouin tribe was found near the Dead Sea who also professed to be descendants of Jehonadab.

=== Verse 19 ===
[Jeremiah said to the house of the Rechabites:] "Therefore thus says the Lord of hosts, the God of Israel: "Jonadab the son of Rechab shall not lack a man to stand before Me forever.""

- "Stand before Me": an expression found over 100 times in the Old Testament means "to stand before someone with an attitude of service," used of priests (Numbers 16:9), kings (1 Kings 10:8) or prophets (1 Kings 17:1). The Septuagint has the closing as παραἵστημι κατά πρόσωπον ἐγώ πᾶς ὁ ἡμέρα ὁ γῆ ("to stand before my face while the earth remains"; Hebrew: לכן כה אמר יהוה צבאות... ). Nehemiah 3:14 notes that "Malchijah the son of Rechab ... repaired the Refuse Gate; he built it and hung its doors with its bolts and bars", cooperating to restore the wall of Jerusalem, approximately 150 years later.

More sightings are reported through the ages: Hegesippus, in his account of the "martyrdom of James the Just", speaks about the "priests of the sons of Rechab" looking on in reverential sympathy with James; Benjamin of Tudela, a Jewish traveller in the 12th century, reports that about 100,000 Jews, who were called "Rechabites" with the customs as in this chapter, lived near El Jubar.

== See also ==
- Babylon
- Chaldea
- Hanan the son of Igdaliah
- Jaazaniah the son of Jeremiah, the son of Habazziniah
- Jonadab the son of Rechab
- Josiah
- Judah
- Maaseiah the son of Shallum
- Syria
- Story of Zosimus
- Related Bible part: Judges 1, 2 Kings 10, 1 Chronicles 2

== Bibliography ==
- Huey, F. B. (1993). The New American Commentary - Jeremiah, Lamentations: An Exegetical and Theological Exposition of Holy Scripture, NIV Text. B&H Publishing Group. ISBN 9780805401165.
- Ryle, Herbert Edward (2009). The Cambridge Bible for Schools and Colleges Paperback. BiblioBazaar. ISBN 9781117708690.
- Würthwein, Ernst (1995). The Text of the Old Testament. Translated by Rhodes, Erroll F. Grand Rapids, MI: Wm. B. Eerdmans. ISBN 0-8028-0788-7.
