= Black Obelisk of Shalmaneser III =

Neo-Assyrian limestone sculpture

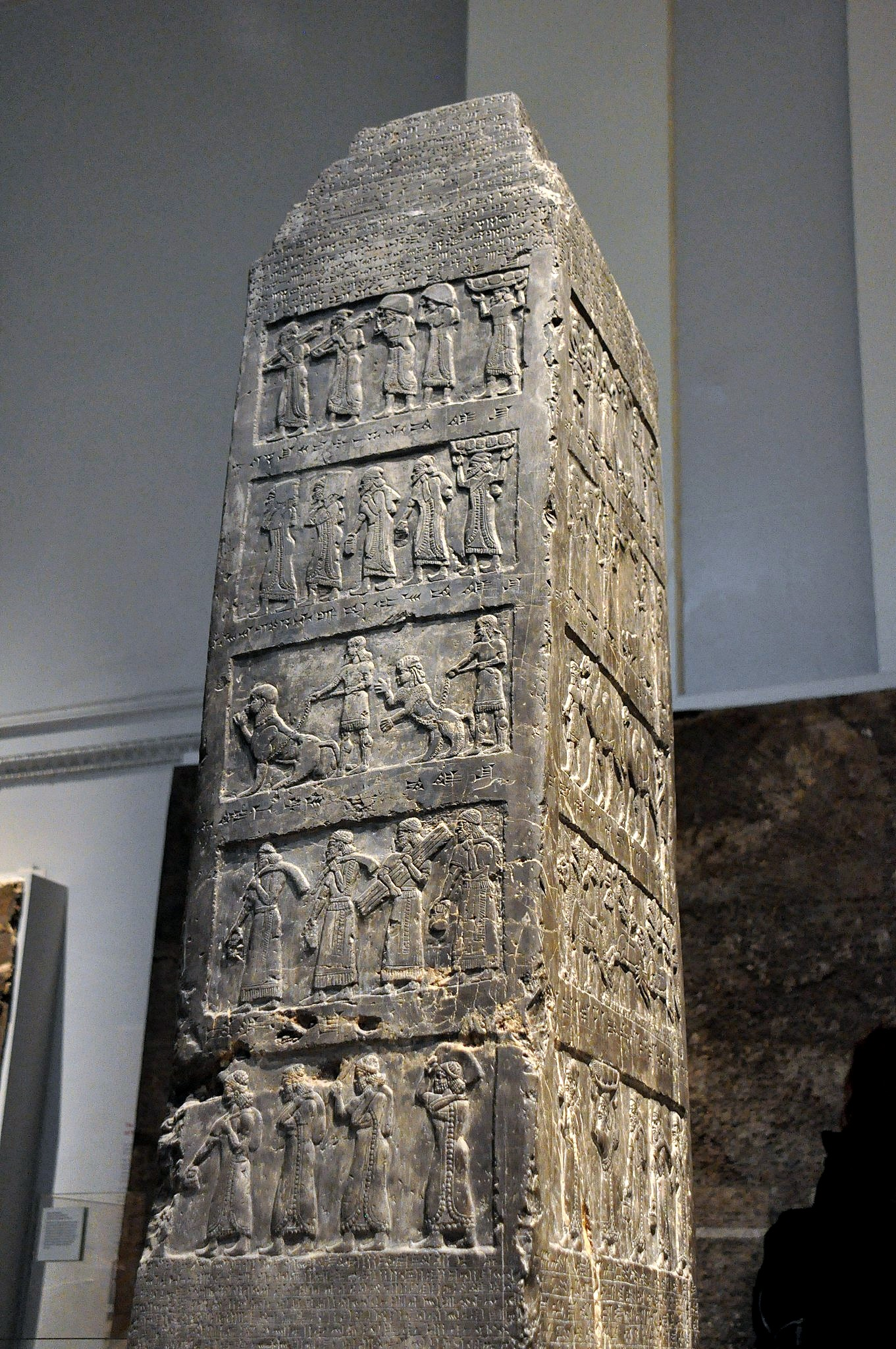
- Black Obelisk of Shalmaneser III in the British Museum. The White Obelisk of Ashurnasirpal I is located next to it
- Material: black limestone
- Size: c. 1.98 metres high, 45 cm wide
- Writing: Akkadian
- Created: 827–824 BC
- Discovered: Nimrud, Ottoman Iraq; 36°05′53″N 43°19′44″E
- Present location: British Museum, London
- Registration: ME 118885

Location
- Location of discovery

The Black Obelisk of Shalmaneser III is a black limestone Neo-Assyrian sculpture with many scenes in bas-relief and inscriptions. It comes from Nimrud (ancient Kalhu), in northern Iraq, and commemorates the deeds of King Shalmaneser III (reigned 858–824 BC). It is on display at the British Museum in London, and several other museums have cast replicas.

It is one of two complete Neo-Assyrian obelisks yet discovered—the other one being the much earlier White Obelisk of Ashurnasirpal I—and is historically significant because it is thought to display the earliest ancient depiction of a biblical figure: Jehu, King of Israel. The traditional identification of "Yaw" as Jehu has been questioned by some scholars, who proposed that the inscription refers to another king, Jehoram of Israel. Its reference to Parsua is also the first known reference to the Persians.

Tribute offerings are shown being brought from identifiable regions and peoples. It was erected as a public monument in 825 BC at a time of civil war, in the central square of Nimrud. It was discovered by archaeologist Sir Austen Henry Layard in 1846 and is now in the British Museum.

== Description ==
It features twenty relief scenes, five on each side. They depict five different subdued kings, bringing tribute and prostrating before the Neo-Assyrian king. From top to bottom they are: (1) Sua of Gilzanu (in north-west Iran), (2) "Yaua of Bit Omri" (Jehu of the House of Omri), (3) an unnamed ruler of Musri (in northern Iraq), (4) Marduk-apil-usur of Suhi (middle Euphrates), and (5) Qalparunda of Patin (Antakya region of Turkey). Each scene occupies four panels around the monument and is described by a cuneiform script above them.

On the top and the bottom of the reliefs there is a long cuneiform inscription recording the annals of Shalmaneser III. It lists the military campaigns which the king and his commander-in-chief headed every year, until the thirty-first year of reign. Some features might suggest that the work had been commissioned by the commander-in-chief, Dayyan-Assur.

== Second register ==
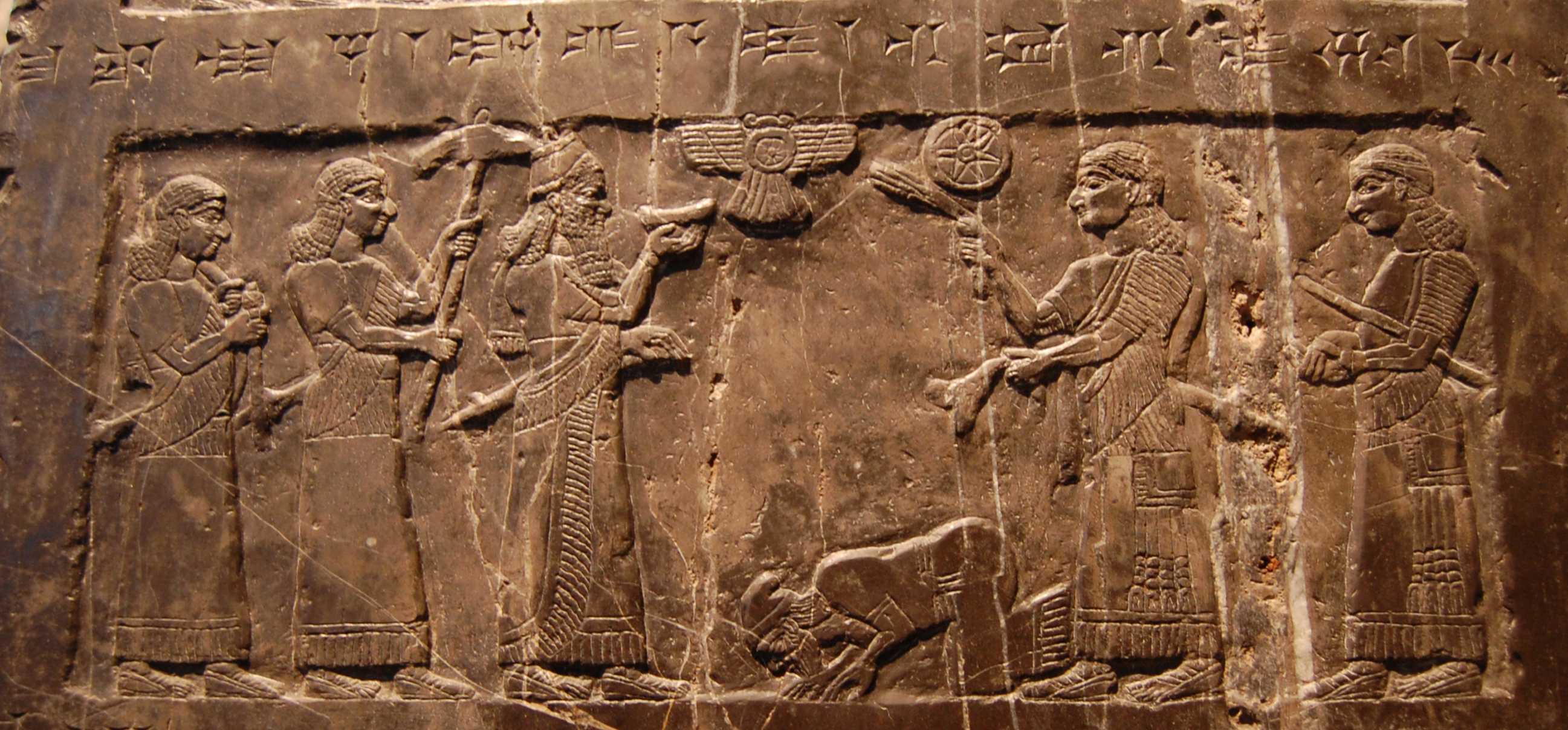
Jehu, bows before Shalmaneser III. This is "the only portrayal we have in ancient Near Eastern art of an Israelite or Judaean monarch".

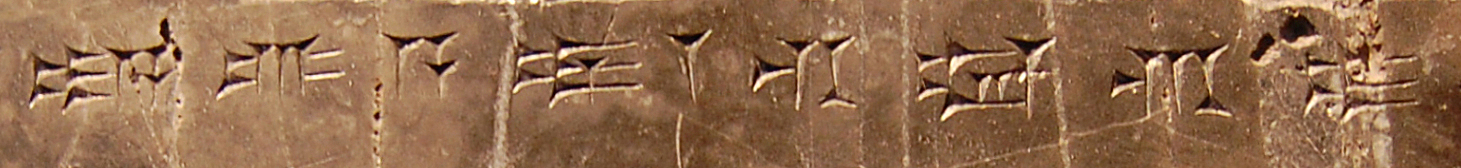
Ia-ú-a mar Hu-um-ri-i (Akkadian: 𒅀𒌑𒀀 𒈥 𒄷𒌝𒊑𒄿): "Jehu, son of Omri".

The second register from the top is thought to include the earliest surviving picture of a biblical figure. The name appears as ^{m}Ia-ú-a mar ^{m}Hu-um-ri-i. Rawlinson's original translation in 1850 seminal work "On the Inscriptions of Assyria and Babylonia" stated: "The second line of offerings are said to have been sent by Yahua, son of Hubiri, a prince of whom there is no mention in the annals, and of whose native country, therefore, I am ignorant" Over a year later, a connection with the bible was made by Reverend Edward Hincks, who wrote in his diary on 21 August 1851: "Thought of an identification of one of the obelisk captives — with Jehu, king of Israel, and satisfying myself on the point wrote a letter to the Athenaeum announcing it". Hincks' letter was published by Athenaeum on the same day, entitled "Nimrud Obelisk". Hincks' identification is now the commonly held position by biblical archaeologists.

The identification of "Yahua" as Jehu was questioned by contemporary scholars such as George Smith as well as in more recent times by P. Kyle McCarter and Edwin R. Thiele, based on the fact that Jehu was not an Omride, as well as transliteration and chronology issues. However, the name read as "Yaw, son of Omri (Bit-Khumri", see House of Omri), is generally accepted to follow Hincks as the Biblical Jehu, king of Israel. This depiction of Jehu is the first historical image of an Israelite.

The stele describes how Jehu brought or sent his tribute in or around 841 BC. The caption above the scene, written in Assyrian cuneiform, can be translated:

"I received the tribute of Iaua (Jehu) son of (the people of the land of) Omri (Akkadian: 𒅀𒌑𒀀 𒈥 𒄷𒌝𒊑𒄿): silver, gold, a golden bowl, a golden vase with pointed bottom, golden tumblers, golden buckets, tin, a staff for a king [and] spears."

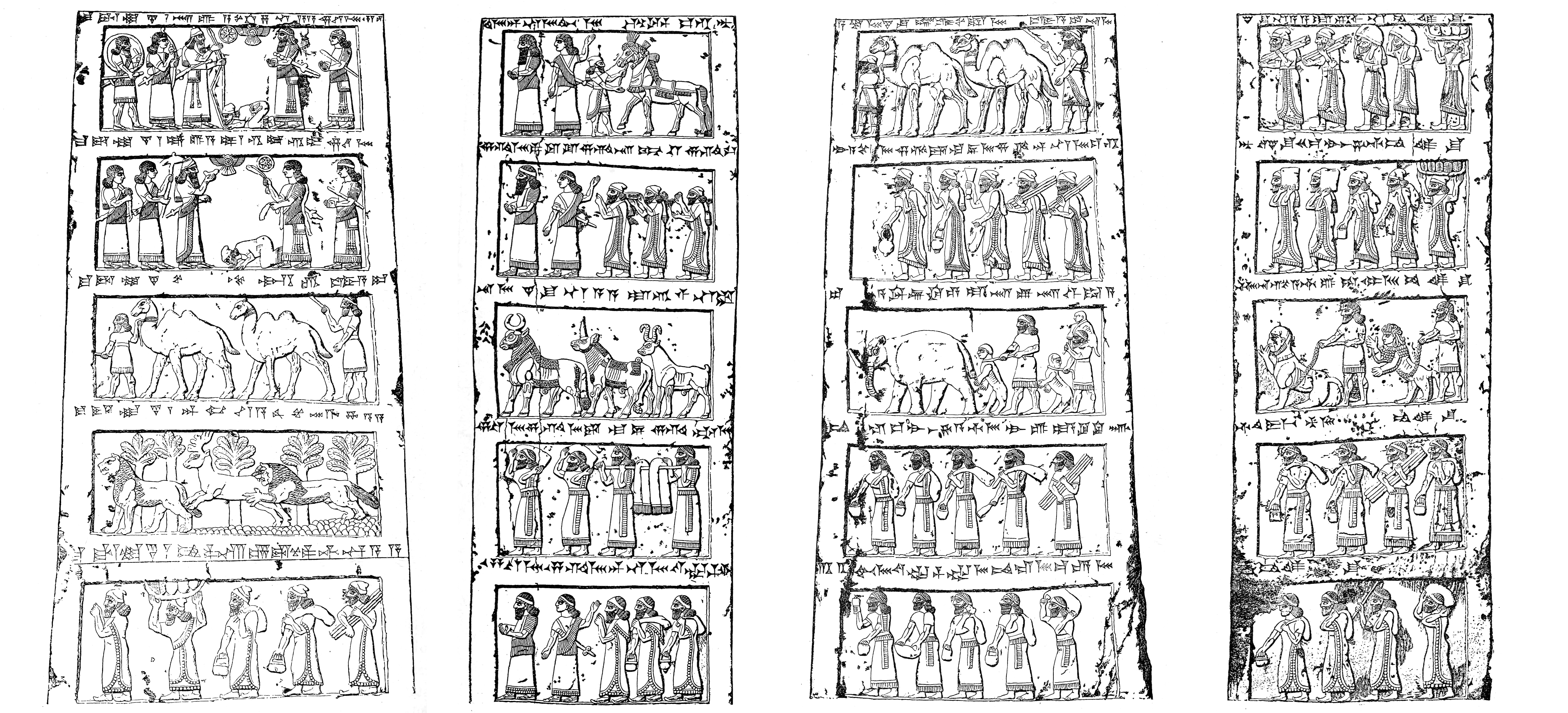
The four illustrated faces of the Black Obelisk. The second row of reliefs illustrates the Israelite delegation of King Jehu.

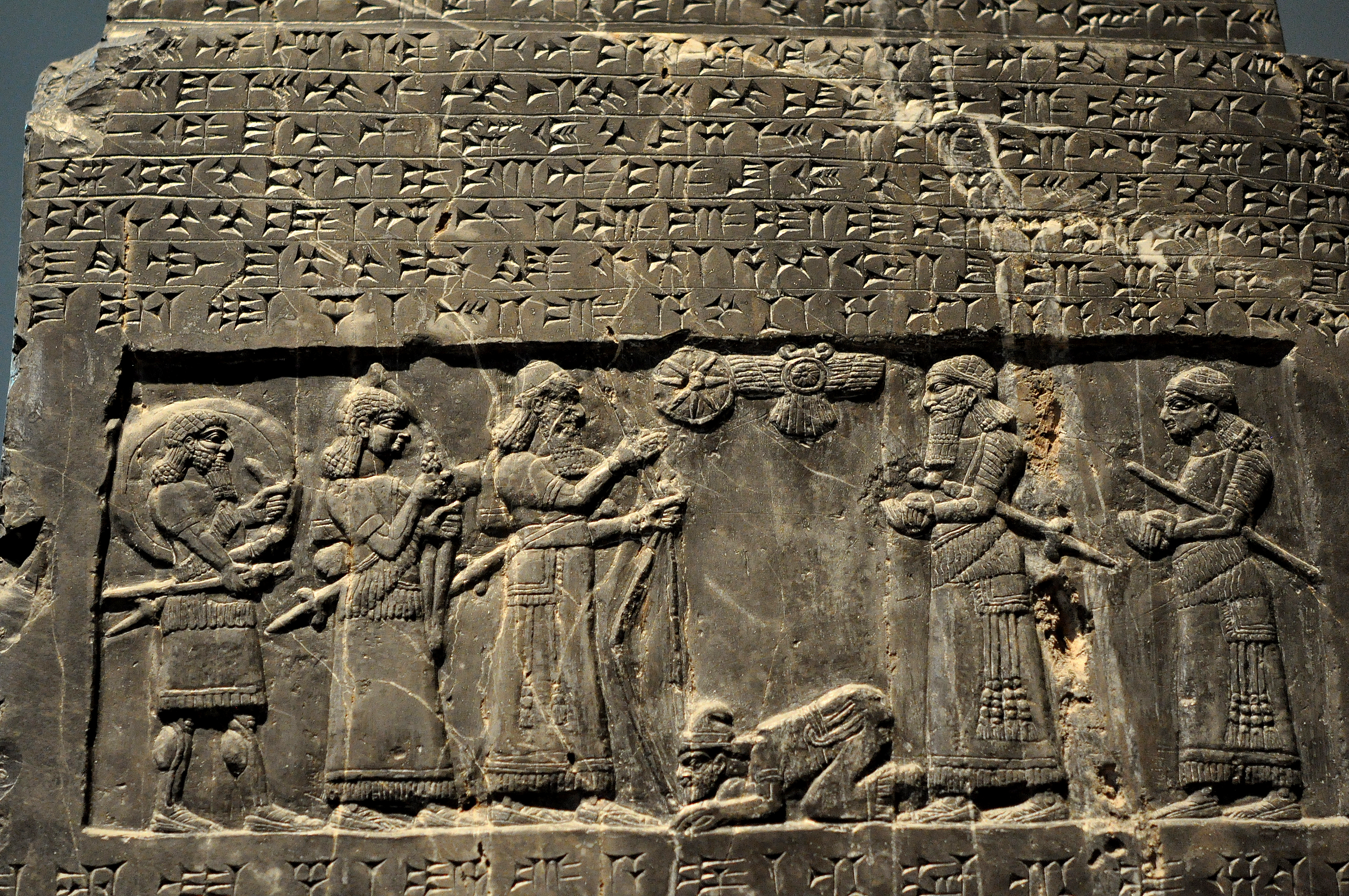
The Neo-Assyrian king Shalmaneser III receives tribute from Sua, king of Gilzanu, The Black Obelisk.

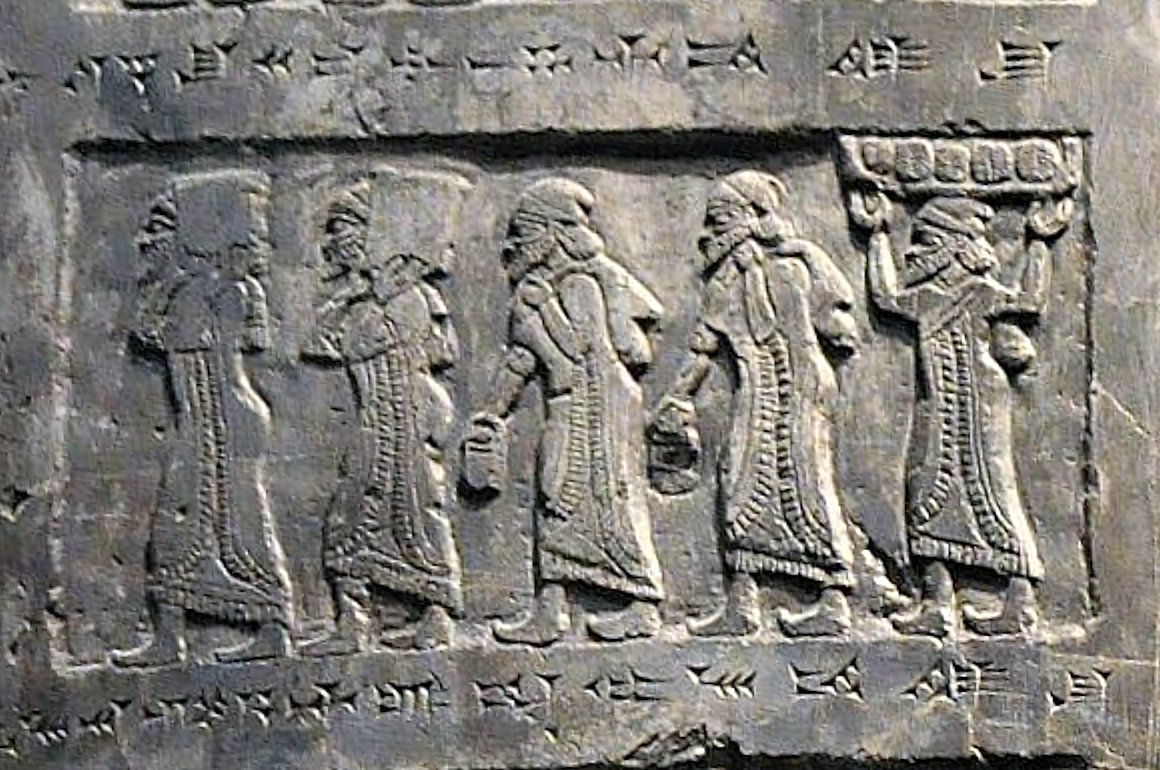
Part of the gift-bearing Israelite delegation of King Jehu, Black Obelisk, 841–840 BCE.

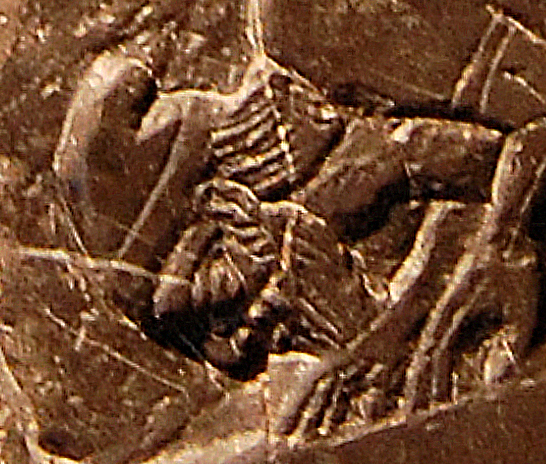
Jehu on the Black Obelisk of Shalmaneser III. This is "the only portrayal we have in ancient Near Eastern art of an Israelite or Judaean monarch".

== Casts and replicas ==
Replicas can be found at the Oriental Institute in Chicago, Illinois; Harvard's Museum of the Ancient Near East in Cambridge, Massachusetts; the ICOR Library in the Semitic Department at The Catholic University of America in Washington, D.C.; Corban University's Prewitt–Allen Archaeological Museum in Salem, Oregon; the Siegfried H. Horn Museum at Andrews University in Berrien Springs, MI; Kelso Museum of Near Eastern Archaeology in Pittsburgh, PA; Canterbury Museum in Christchurch, New Zealand; the Museum of Ancient Art at Aarhaus University in Denmark, and in the library of the Theological University of the Reformed Churches in Kampen, the Netherlands.

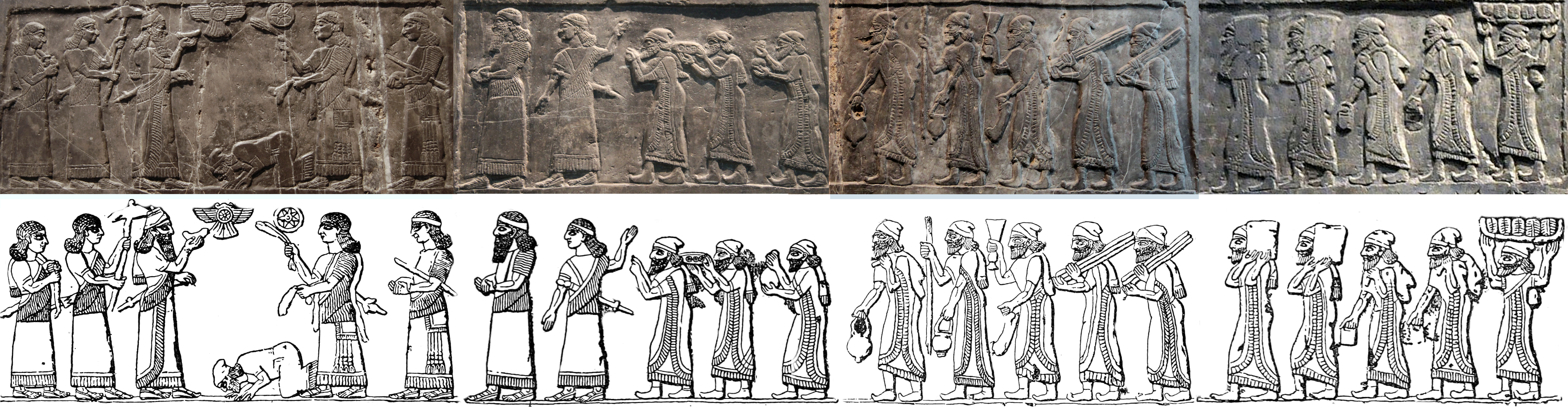
Israelite delegation to Shalmaneser III, composed of the four friezes of the second tier. Black Obelisk, 841–840 BCE.

== See also ==
- Kurkh Monoliths
- List of artifacts significant to the Bible
