= Saptharishishwarar Temple, Lalgudi =

Shiva temple in Tamil Nadu, India

- Saptharishiswarar Temple, Lalgudi, Tiruchirapalli, Tamil Nadu

Religion
- Affiliation: Hinduism
- District: Tiruchirapalli
- Deity: Saptharishiswarar
- Festivals: Maha Shivaratri, Thiruvathira, Karthika Deepam, Panguni festival

Location
- Location: Lalgudi
- State: Tamil Nadu
- Country: India
- Coordinates: 10°52′13″N 78°49′14″E

Architecture
- Type: Dravidian architecture Cholas, & Nayarkagal

Specifications
- Temple: One
- Elevation: 84.94 m (279 ft)

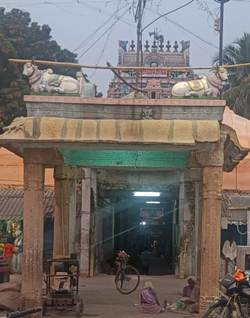
Saptharishishwarar temple

Lalgudi taluk

Saptharishishwarar Temple, Lalgudi is a Hindu temple dedicated to the deity Shiva and located at Lalgudi in Tiruchirapalli district, Tamil Nadu, India.

Also known as Thavathurai or Eluvar Thavathurai, Saptharishishwarar Temple is one of the shrines of the Vaippu Sthalams sung by Tamil Saivite Nayanar Appar.

== Location ==
The temple is located at Lalgudi in Tiruchirapalli district, Tamil Nadu, very near Trichy, and is open for worship from 6.00 am to 11.30 am and 4.00 pm to 9.00 pm.

== Presiding deity ==
The presiding deity in the garbhagriha (innermost sanctum) is known as Saptharishishwarar and is represented by the lingam, which has some cracks on it. The goddess is known as Mahasampath Gowri and Periyanayaki.srimathi, perunduraiperatiyar.

Sculptures of Shiva carrying the skull-topped club called Khaṭvāṅga can be found in the temple, as well as in Ekambaranathar Temple and Valisvarar Temple. Saptharishishwarar Temple is also sung of in the Thiruppugazh, and inscriptions of Thiruppugazh songs can be found next to the shrine of Vinayaka as well as inscriptions asserting Tyagaraja came to the temple and sang five kirtanas (musically recited stories). Shiva is believed to be residing in Paraitthurai, Thenpalaithurai, Thavathurai, Mayiladuthurai, Kadambandurai, and Avaduthurai as well as here at Saptharishishwarar Temple, and should be worshipped by one and all.

== Origin of name ==
The name of Lord Shiva associated with the Saptharesheswarar temple is derived from an event involving the revered sages called the Saptarishi. The sages Vasishtha, Atri, Bhrigu, Pulathiyar, Gowthamar, Angirasa, and Marichi once worshipped the presiding deity of the temple, but their wives neglected to feed baby Murugan and instead prioritized their service to their husbands during a pooja (ritual of devotional worship). Realizing the gravity of their actions, Karthikeya – also known as Murugan – cursed the sages. In order to absolve themselves of these curses the Saptarishi undertook intense penance and worship, ultimately attaining liberation and ascending into the sky as seven stars. The seven stars or the Saptarishi are then believed to have worshipped the presiding deity of the temple, after which the temple came to be known as Saptharishishwarar.

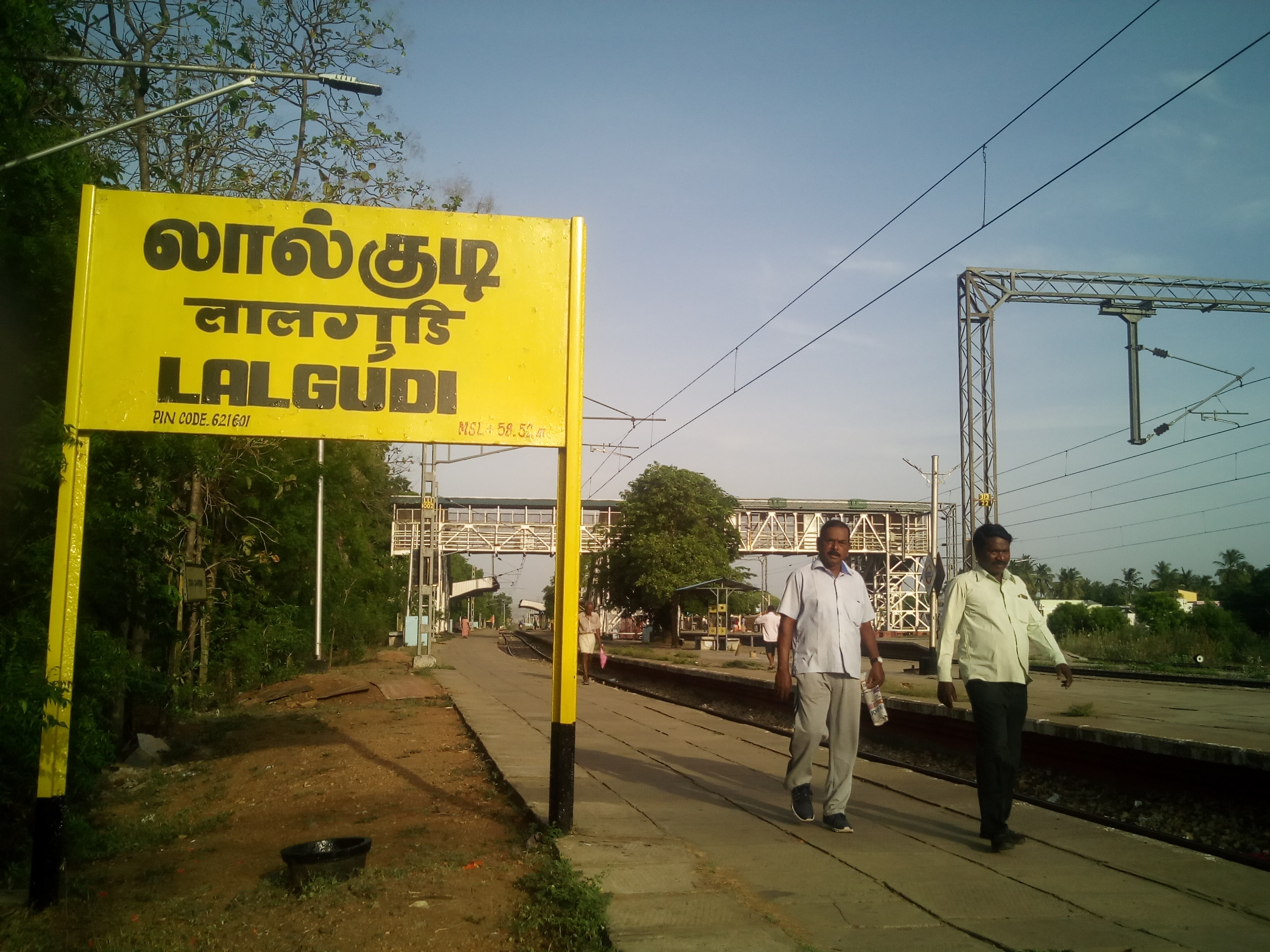
Lalgudi Railway Station

The name Saptharesheswarar thus is both a testament to this divine episode signifying the connection between the seven sages and Lord Shiva, as well as an illustration of the sages' eventual attainment of moksha (spiritual liberation) through penance and devotion.

== Festivals ==
The festivals of Sivarathri, Karthikai, Margazhi Tiruvathirai, and Panguni Ther Thiruvizha are held in the temple. Each festival includes the processing of one of five major chariots: Vinayagar, Murugan, Shvan (Saptharesiawarar), Amman (Perunduraiperatiyar/Srimahi Amman), and Chandegeswarar.

These chariots have a rich historical significance dating back to ancient times when the chariots were originally known as Theruadachan. This name signified the seemingly endless nature of their procession along the streets, since they took nearly six months to complete a single circuit of four streets, with the assistance of elephants and participation from six surrounding villagers. However, in 1936 the chariot procession was temporarily closed due to issues relating to the independence struggle and the scarcity of elephants.

In 2011, after a hiatus of 75 years, Minister K. N. Nehru oversaw extensive renovations costing ₹1 crore (ten million rupees). The Panguni Ther Thiruvizha chariot was refurbished with six iron wheels – 4 outer wheels with a height of 9 ft and 2 inner wheels with a height of 7 ft – three hydraulic brakes, and iron plates. Adorned with over 2000 sculptures crafted from mahua tree woods, the 30-foot-tall wooden chariot is the largest and highest in Trichy. During the Panguni Ther Thiruvizha festival held in March/April the chariot is beautifully decorated so as to reach a total height of 96–100 ft, making it one of the top 10 largest chariots in Tamil Nadu.
