= Story of Zosimus =

The Story of Zosimus (also called the Narration, Apocalypse or Journey of Zosimus) is a Greek text of the 5th century AD. It has sometimes been classified as among the Old Testament pseudepigrapha. In the Middle Ages, it was translated into Syriac, Arabic, Ge'ez, Armenian, Georgian and Slavonic.

There is a history of debate over whether the text is Jewish or Christian in origin, and over its textual history. The Story is divided into 18 chapters, of which chapters 8–10 form a self-contained work conventionally known as the "History of the Rechabites" and chapters 11–16 form a distinct work known as the "Abode of the Blessed". The "History" was once thought to be the original kernel, around which the rest of the text was composed, but this is not generally accepted today. It has even been argued to be a late addition to the text.

The Story is based on the classical legend of the Isles of the Blessed and the biblical passage Jeremiah 35. It shows heavy Hellenic influence, and the narrative is much like a typical Hellenic myth, particularly showing similarity to the tales of the Therapeutae. It begins with Zosimus, a hermit, continually begging God to show him the land of the Rechabites, until God finally relents and sends an angel to lead him there. The Rechabites, led by Jonadab, are described as living without the benefit of human technology, enjoying the company of angels, leading an ascetic life, wearing no clothes and eating only the luxurious fruits that grow on their fragrant island.
