= Jehoshaphat (father of Jehu) =

Son of Nimshi, Father of Jehu

According to the Hebrew Bible, Jehoshaphat was the father of King Jehu and the son of Nimshi. He is mentioned in 2 Kings 9:2, 2 Kings 9:14 and 2 Chronicles 22:9. There are some points in the Bible that Jehu is called the son of Nimshi only.

Amitai Baruchi-Unna suggests that he was Omri's grandson.
