= Isle Brewers =

Village and civil parish in Somerset, England

Coordinates: 50.9859°N 2.9017°W

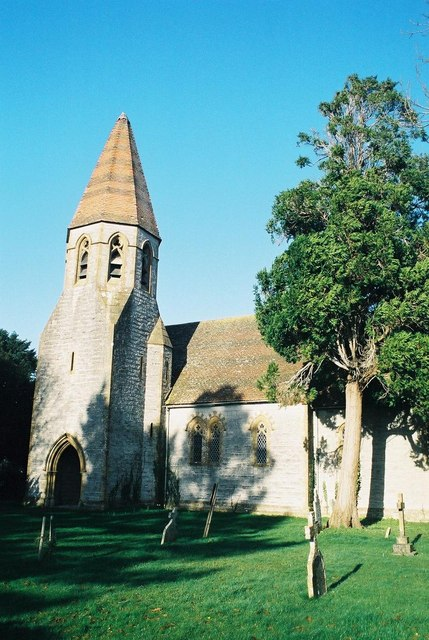
- All Saints Church, Isle Brewers

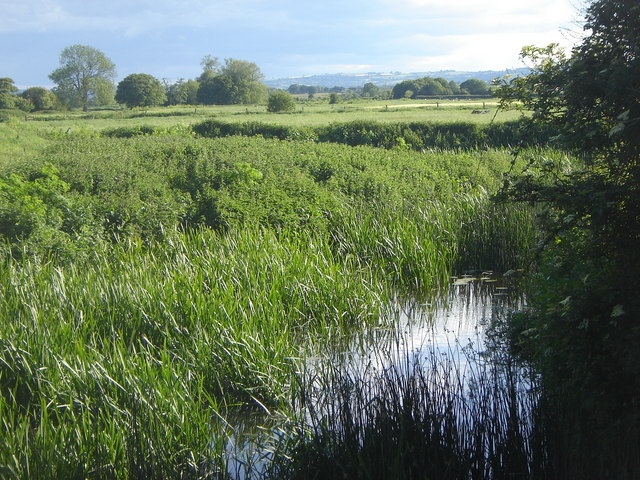
- River Isle from bridge, looking south

- Location within Somerset
- Population: 150 (2011)
- OS grid reference: ST368211
- Unitary authority: Somerset Council
- Ceremonial county: Somerset
- Region: South West
- Country: England
- Sovereign state: United Kingdom
- Post town: Taunton
- Postcode district: TA3
- Dialling code: 01460
- Police: Avon and Somerset
- Fire: Devon and Somerset
- Ambulance: South Western
- UK Parliament: Glastonbury and Somerton

Isle Brewers is a village and parish in Somerset, England, situated on the River Isle, 7 miles (11.3 km) south east of Taunton. The village has a population of 150. The parish includes the hamlet of North Bradon.

== History ==
The first part of the name of the village comes from the River Isle, which separates the parish from Isle Abbotts and the second from the family of William Brewer (Briwere) who were the lords of the manor in the early 13th century.

== Governance ==
The parish council has responsibility for local issues, including setting an annual precept (local rate) to cover the council's operating costs and producing annual accounts for public scrutiny. The parish council evaluates local planning applications and works with the local police, district council officers, and neighbourhood watch groups on matters of crime, security, and traffic. The parish council's role also includes initiating projects for the maintenance and repair of parish facilities, as well as consulting with the district council on the maintenance, repair, and improvement of highways, drainage, footpaths, public transport, and street cleaning. Conservation matters (including trees and listed buildings) and environmental issues are also the responsibility of the council.

For local government purposes, since 1 April 2023, the parish comes under the unitary authority of Somerset Council. Prior to this, it was part of the non-metropolitan district of South Somerset (established under the Local Government Act 1972). It was part of Langport Rural District before 1974.

It is also part of the Glastonbury and Somerton county constituency represented in the House of Commons of the Parliament of the United Kingdom. It elects one Member of Parliament (MP) by the first past the post system of election.

== Parish church ==
The Anglican parish church of All Saints was built in 1861 by Charles Edmund Giles. The original Church of All Saints stood near the Domesday mill, and the current building was funded by the vicar Joseph Wolff, a Jewish Christian missionary of German ancestry who converted to Catholicism, before being ordained in the Anglican church. He later died in the village.
