= Saptharishiswarar =

Saptharishiswarar is one of the names for Shiva, one of the main deities of Hinduism. He is worshipped in this name at South India in an ancient temple. This ancient shiva temple dates back to 6600 years approximately. The exact age of the temple cannot be determined. The temple is located in South India in a small village called Thiruthalayur. The village located en route of Pulivalam to Musri is in Thurayur taluk of Tiruchy district in Tamil Nadu. History states the temple was erected by emperor PURAR approximately 6600 years back. The intention of erecting the temple was to ward of the Brahmahati Dosha, the emperor had. The temple is located in the river bed of Ayyaru, but the river has vanished long back and the lands around are cultivated lands now.

There are 2 shivalingas in the temple. The Shivalinga in the main altar was worshiped by the saptha rishis. The other liga was erected by King Ravana and worshiped by him on the way from Kailash back to Lanka after obtaining a boon from lord Shiva for 35 million years of life. King Ravana on his way back from Kailash saw this temple from his Viman and came down and made a linga and started worshipping it. The seven saints, Saptha Rishis on seeing Ravana hid in a tree behind the temple. A tree present behind the temple called Marutha Maram in native language exists. There are multiple knots on the tree and 7 prominent ones which are believed to be the rishis in the tree.

Since Ravana had 35 million years to live, Lord Vishnu wanted it to be shortened. So he assumed the form of an old brahman at a place called Kathri Medu approximately 1 km from Thiruthlayaur to tackle Ravana. As Ravana was passing by he saw the old man watering a Thulasi plant in pot with a pitcher with holes in it. King Ravana addressed the old man and the old man being pleased blessed him and told him to request more years of life from Lord Shiva. King Ravana took to the suggestion and started severe prayers to Lord Shiva. Ravana started cutting his own head one by one as he had 10 heads. When he was about to cut his 10th and last head, pleased with his worship Lord Shiva appeared in front of him and granted a boon. Ravana asked for 5 million years of life. The Lord granted him and vanished. Then Ravana realised he was tricked as he failed to mention that this 5 million years was to be in addition to the 35 million years he already had. But it was late and his life span was reduced from 35 million years to 5 million years.

The following legend is wrong, as it is confusing another location called Thiruthalaiyur elsewhere: Other interesting facts about the temple are a Ruthra Pasupathi Nayanar, one of the 64 Nayanmars, lived here and worshiped Lord Shiva. Also it i noted that for a period of 6 months the light from the sun in the morning falls on the feet or the base of the Shiva Linga for about 15 minutes during the day. A pond that adorns the front of the temple has water in it based on the monsoon that year. The pond had intricate canals constructed which lead water to the base of the shiva linga. But over the years the canal seems to have given way and water does not flow down to the linga as described in literature. Also noted according to folklore is the pond does not have any frogs in it. It is said Mandothari who was Ravana's wife assumed the form of a frog and guarded the temple when Ravana was in prayer and did not let anyone into the temple.

There is not much history about Kungumabal. Such a great temple now stands in almost desolate ruins. It needs to be revived by proper construction.
