= All Saints Church, Isle Brewers =

Church in Somerset, England

All Saints Church
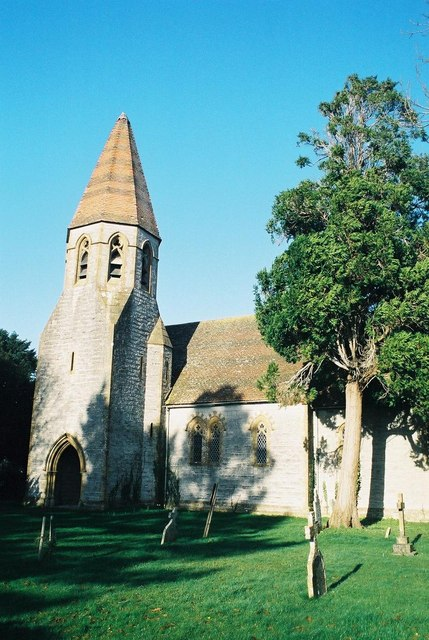

Religion
- Affiliation: Church of England
- Ecclesiastical or organizational status: Active
- Year consecrated: 1861

Location
- Location: Isle Brewers, Somerset, England
- Interactive map of All Saints Church
- Coordinates: 50.9853°N 2.8996°W

Architecture
- Architect: Charles Edmund Giles
- Type: Church

All Saints Church is a Church of England parish church in Isle Brewers, Somerset, England. Designed by Charles Edmund Giles, it was built in 1859-61 and has been a Grade II listed building since 1959.

== History ==
All Saints was built to replace the parish church of Isle Brewers, which had become dilapidated beyond repair and too small to serve the congregation. Furthermore, its location made it prone to flooding in the winter. In response, the vicar of Isle Brewers, Rev. Dr Joseph Wolff, who had already provided the village with a schoolroom and parsonage, began raising funds for a new church by public subscription. Funding had reached £200 by March 1858, and a half-acre plot of land, approximately a quarter of a mile from the existing church, was donated by General Sir John Michel. In August 1859, Rev. Wolff completed a tour of northern and central England, where he preached and lectured in the effort to raise funds for the new church.

The plans for the church were drawn up by Charles Edmund Giles of London and Taunton, and John Spiller of Taunton hired as the builder. The foundation stone was laid by Hon. Henry Walpole on 22 September 1859. The ceremony was attended by members of the local clergy and the Archdeacon of Taunton, George Denison. Sir John Pakington was originally invited to lay the stone, but illness prevented his attendance. Approximately £1,000 of the £1,300 cost of the church had been collected at the time of the ceremony. The completed church was consecrated by the Bishop of Bath and Wells, the Right Rev. Robert Eden, on 2 August 1861.

In recent years, the church has been added to Historic England's Heritage at Risk Register, owing to the poor condition of its roof and ceiling, along with two windows and the tower. The church was awarded £250,000 by the National Lottery Heritage Fund in 2018. In addition to restoration, the funding is to be used to adapt the church for additional use as a community space. The pews are to be made moveable and a kitchen and toilets added.

== Architecture ==
All Saints is built of blue lias stone, with dressings in Hamstone and roofed with Bridgwater tiles, in the Early English style. It was designed to accommodate 170 persons and is made up of a three-bay nave, two-bay chancel, vestry, heating chamber and tower (incorporating the porch). The tower, 72 feet (22 m) in height, was originally fitted with the bells from the old parish church.

The open roof is largely made of stained and varnished red deal, and the same material was also used for the pews except those in the chancel which were made from oak. The chancel window was gifted and painted by Mrs Miles of Bingham Rectory. The tesselated pavement and stonework was supplied by Mr Brinson of Curry Mallet. The church retains many of its original fittings including the pews, reredos, pulpit and lectern. The Norman font, along with two Jacobean coffin stools and an 18th-century chest, was transferred from the village's earlier church.
