= Rechab =

Name of various Biblical figures

Rechab (Hebrew: רֵכָב Rēḵāḇ) is the name of three men in the Bible:

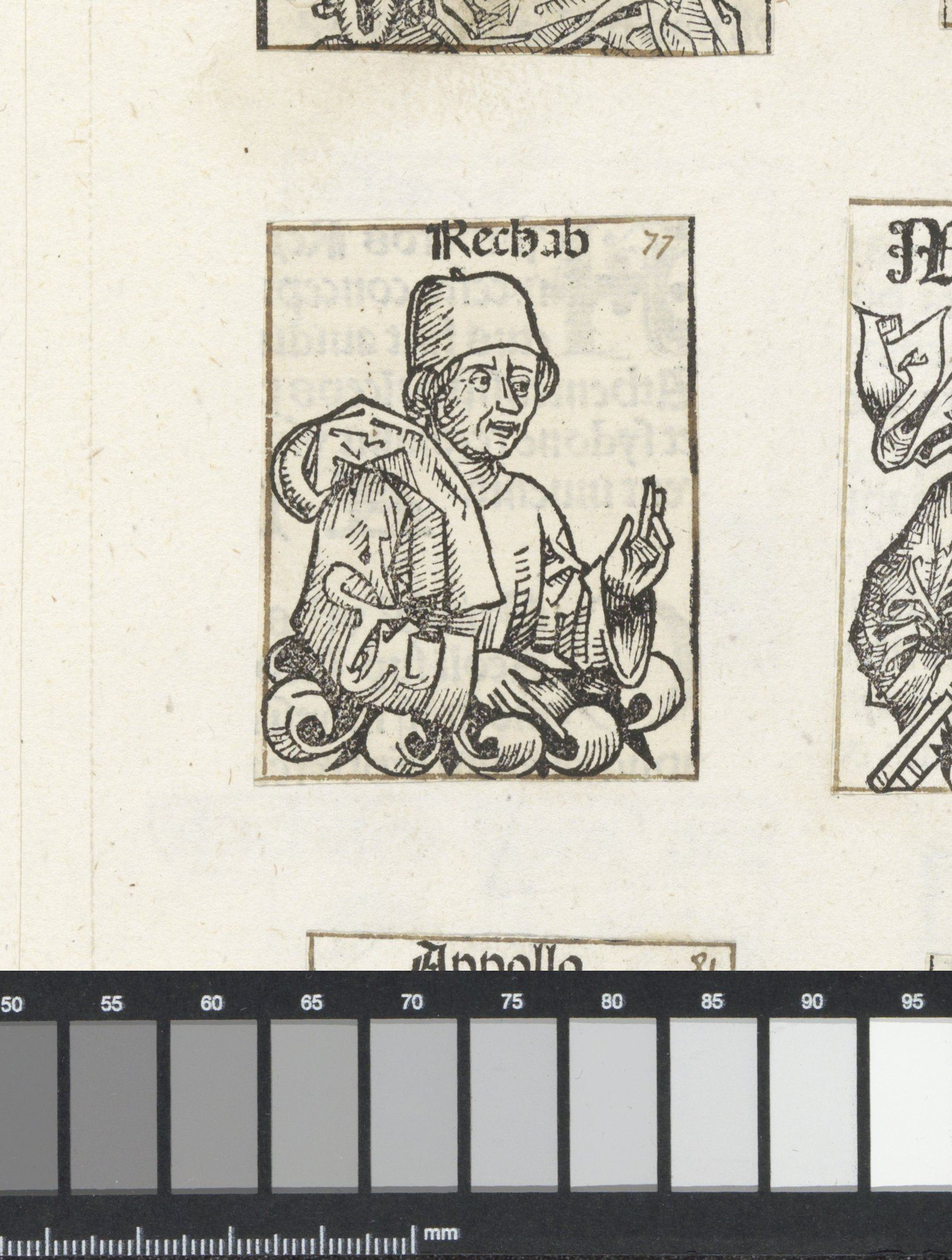
Rechab the father of Jonadab by Hartmann Schedel's book called Nuremberg Chronicles
- One of the two "captains of bands" whom Saul's son Ish-bosheth took into his service, and who conspired to kill him. (2 Samuel 4:2)
- A Kenite, mentioned as the father of Jehonadab at King Jehu's time, from whom the tribe of the Rechabites derived their name. Jehonadab and his people had all along become worshippers of God.
- The father of Malchiah, ruler of part of Beth-haccerem. (Nehemiah 3:14)

== See also ==
- Rahab
- Rechabites
