= Museum of Ancient Art, Aarhus =

Archaeology museum in Aarhus, Denmark

Coordinates: 56°10′13.8″N 10°12′1.5″E

Museum of Ancient Art
- Antikmuseet
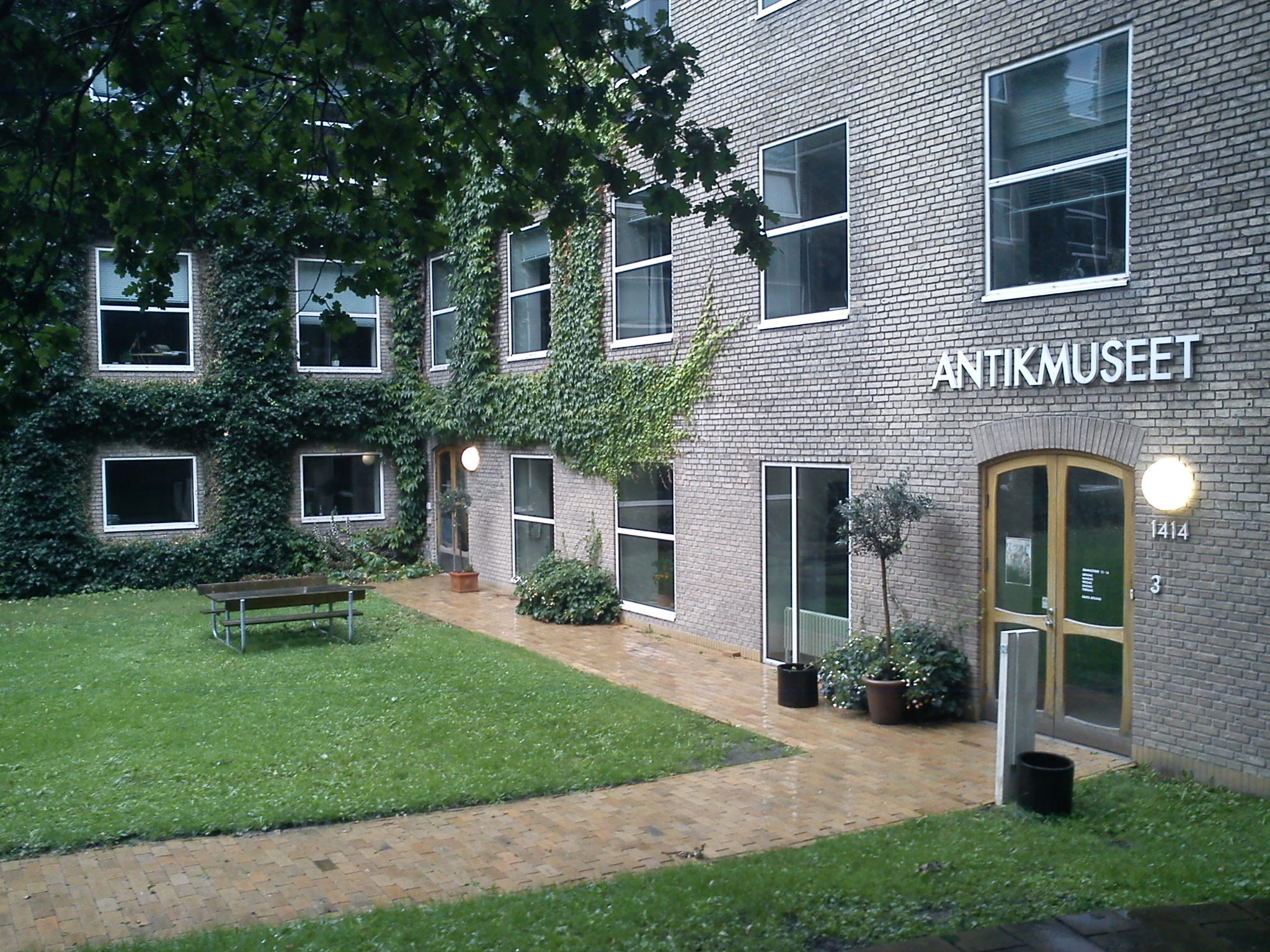
- Entrance to the Museum of Ancient Art
- Established: 1949
- Location: Victor Albecks Vej 3, Århus; Denmark
- Type: Cultural history
- Website: Museum of Ancient Art

The Museum of Ancient Art (Danish: Antikmuseet) in Aarhus, Denmark is museum dedicated to the ancient art and cultural history of the mediterranean countries, in particular Ancient Greece, Etruscan civilization and Ancient Rome. The museum is situated in the university campus in the district Midtbyen.

The museum was founded in 1949 by a professor from Aarhus University as a study collection in classical archaeology. The basis of the collection was 500 artifacts from the ancient cultures around the mediterranean donated by the National Museum and a number of plaster casts of antique sculptures from a museum in Aarhus. In 1971 the present exhibition area was inaugurated and since then the collection has been much expanded through purchases, presents and donations. The new physical framework and the many additions meant the collection could serve a wider audience than university students and the name of the collection was changed to the Museum of Ancient Art. In 2003 the museum was renovated and has since hosted a number of special exhibits.

== Collection ==
The museum collection includes about 4000 original artifacts from the ancient cultures in the mediterranean. The mummy of the temple singer Tabast and amulets in earthenware, clay figurines, bronze bowls and incense tubs illustrates Ancient Egypt and other Near Eastern oriental cultures. Ancient Greece is represented with a collection of ceramics from Mycene, black and red-ceramics from Athens and decorated ceramics from Corinthia. Votive offerings for the gods and burial gifts to the dead in the form of clay figures in bronze and drinking cups shows aspects of religious life. Lamps, utensils, keys, game pieces and glas shows everyday life in Roman society.

The Greek coin collection is one of the most extensive in Northern Europe with about 2500 Greek and Roman coins spanning the East Greek city states in present-day Turkey to coins from the Hellenic kingdoms. The Roman coins contains coins from the earliest Republic when they more closely resembled metal lumps to the late antique period when the coins were engraved with portrait of Emperor Constantine.
