= Jehu =

Tenth king of Israel

Jehu יֵהוּא
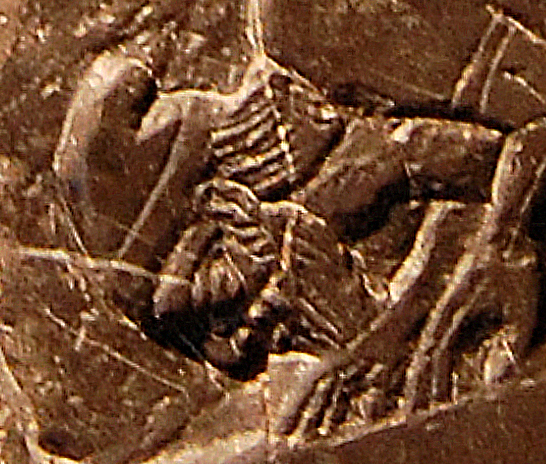
- Jehu on the Black Obelisk of Shalmaneser III

King of Israel (Northern Kingdom)
- Reign: 28 years c. 841–814 BCE (Thiele) c. 842-815 (Albright)
- Coronation: Ramoth-Gilead, Israel
- Predecessor: Jehoram
- Successor: Jehoahaz
- Born: -
- Died: c. 815/814 BCE
- Burial: Samaria, Kingdom of Israel
- Issue: Jehoahaz
- Father: Jehoshaphat

Jehu (/ˈdʒiːhuː/; Hebrew: יֵהוּא, romanized: Yēhūʾ, meaning "Yah is He"; Neo-Assyrian Akkadian: 𒅀𒌑𒀀, romanized: Yawa; Latin: Iehu) was the tenth king of the northern Kingdom of Israel since Jeroboam I, noted for exterminating the house of Ahab. He was the son of Jehoshaphat, grandson of Nimshi, and possibly great-grandson of Omri, although the latter notion is not supported by the biblical text. His reign lasted 28 years.

William F. Albright has dated Jehu's reign to 842–815 BCE, while Edwin R. Thiele offers the dates 841–814 BCE. The principal source for the events of his reign comes from 2 Kings.

== Biblical narrative ==
=== Proclamation as king ===
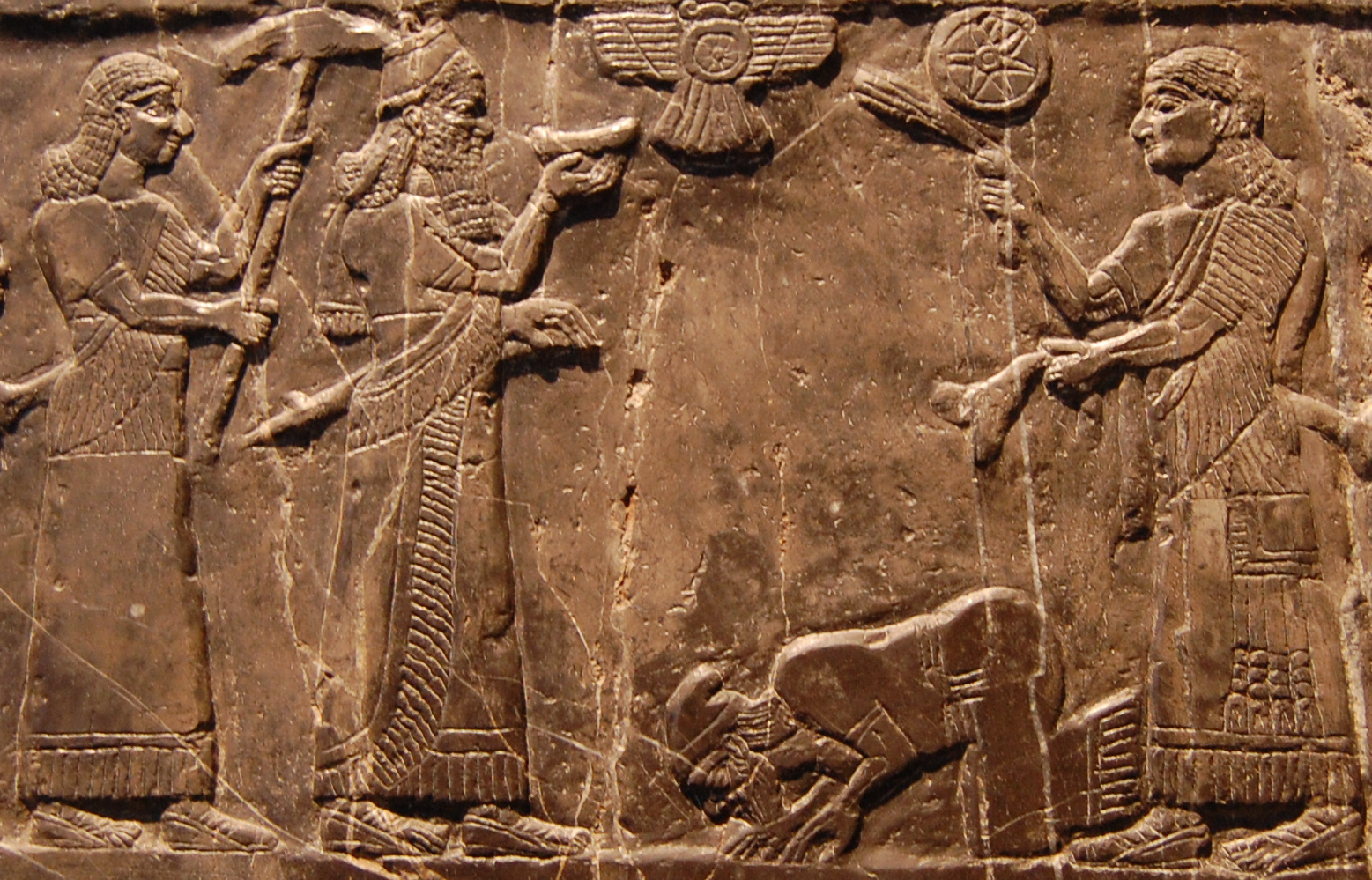
The tribute of "Jehu of the people of the land of Omri" (Akkadian: 𒅀𒌑𒀀 𒈥 𒄷𒌝𒊑𒄿) as depicted on the Black Obelisk of Shalmaneser III

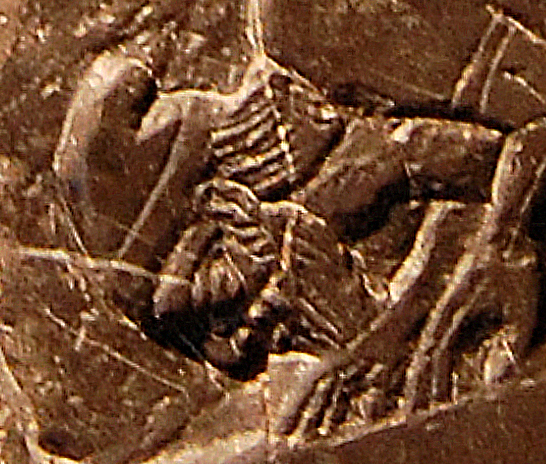
Jehu on the Black Obelisk of Shalmaneser III. This is "the only portrayal we have in ancient Near Eastern art of an Israelite or Judaean monarch".

Jehu was anointed King of Israel by one of the sons of the prophets at the behest of Elisha the prophet in 2 Kings 9:1–13 (The reign of Jehu's predecessor, Jehoram, was marked by the Battle of Ramoth-Gilead against the army of the Arameans. Jehoram was wounded and returned to Jezreel to recover. He was attended by Ahaziah, king of Judah, who was also his nephew, son of his sister Athaliah. Meanwhile, according to the writer of the Books of Kings, the prophet Elisha ordered one of his students to go to Ramoth-Gilead and separate Jehu, a military commander at the time, from his companions. There, he was to anoint Jehu as king in an inner chamber and explain to him that he was to act as an agent of divine judgment against the house of Ahab. The student followed these instructions, and upon completion he ran away. Jehu initially dismissed the student as a "madman", but nonetheless told his companions about his anointing. His companions later enthusiastically blew their trumpets and proclaimed him their king.

=== Jezreel and the deaths of Jehoram and Jezebel ===
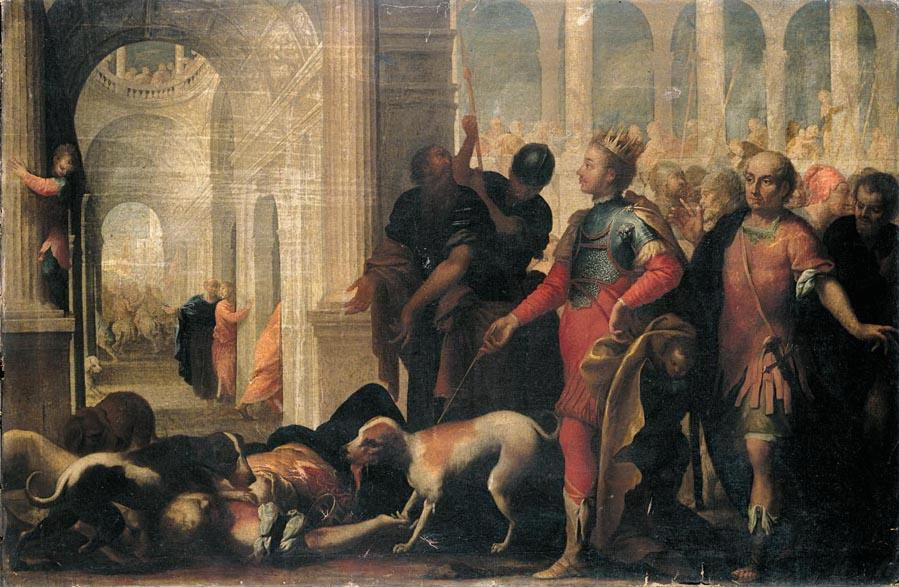
Queen Jezebel Being Punished by Jehu. Andrea Celesti (1637–1712).

With a chosen band, Jehu planned his conspiracy against King Jehoram and secretly entered Jezreel. Jehoram tried to flee, but Jehu shot an arrow that pierced his heart. Jehu later threw his body on Naboth's vineyard, to avenge Naboth, whom Jehoram's father and mother had murdered. King Ahaziah fled after seeing Jehoram's death but Jehu wounded him. Ahaziah fled to Megiddo, where he died.

Jehu proceeded to enter the premises of the palace at Jezreel. Jezebel watched him with contempt from the palace window and mockingly compared him to King Zimri. Jehu later commanded Jezebel's eunuchs to throw her out of the palace window. They obeyed his commands and Jezebel was instantly killed. Jehu trampled over her body, and when he decided later to arrange a proper burial due to her royal descent, only her skull, hands and feet remained. The rest of her body had been eaten by dogs.

Now master of Jezreel, Jehu wrote to command the chief men in Samaria to hunt down and kill all the royal princes. They did so, and the next day they piled the 70 heads in two heaps outside the city gate, as Jehu commanded. Ahab's entire family was slain. Shortly afterward, Jehu encountered the 42 "brothers of Ahaziah" (since the brothers of Ahaziah had been taken away and probably killed by the Philistines, these must have been relatives of Ahaziah in a broader sense, like nephews and cousins) at "Beth-eked of the shepherds". They told Jehu they were visiting the royal family. Jehu killed them all at "the pit of Beth-eked".

After Jehu's slaughter of the House of Ahab, he met Jehonadab the Rechabite and convinced him that he was pro-Yahwist. Jehonadab quickly allied with him, and they entered the capital together. In control of Samaria, he invited the worshippers and priests of Baal to a ceremony, then trapped and killed them. He then destroyed their idols and temple, and turned the temple into a latrine.

=== Reign ===
Other than Jehu's bloody seizure of power and tolerance for the golden calves at Dan and Bethel, which was criticized as a "heretical" interpretation of Yahwism, little else is known of his reign. He was hard pressed by Hazael, king of the Arameans, who defeated his armies "throughout all of the territories of Israel" beyond the Jordan River, in the lands of Gilead, Gad, Reuben, and Manasseh.

This suggests that Jehu offered tribute to Shalmaneser III, as depicted on his Black Obelisk, in order to gain a powerful ally against the Arameans. Bit-Khumri was used by Tiglath-Pileser III for the non-Omride kings Pekah (733) & Hoshea (732), hence House/Land/Kingdom of Omri could apply to later Israelite kings not necessarily descended from Omri. According to others, this description should be taken very literally, as in this period Assyrians were very closely following the events in this area, with control slipping in later years.

The destruction of the house of Ahab is commended by the author of 2 Kings as a form of divine punishment. Yahweh rewards Jehu for being a willing executor of divine judgment by allowing four generations of kings to sit on the throne of Israel. Jehu and his descendants Jehoahaz, Jehoash, Jeroboam II, and Zachariah ruled Israel for 102 years. Nonetheless, according to the Book of Hosea, God punished the House of Jehu through the hands of the Assyrians for Jehu's massacre at Jezreel, and some Biblical commentators reasoned that this was because Jehu's motives may not have been entirely pure in his massacre.

== Archaeological evidences ==
=== Tel Dan Stele ===
The author of the Tel Dan Stele (9th century BCE, found in 1993 and 1994) claimed to have slain both Ahaziah of Judah and Jehoram of Israel. Most scholars identify Hazael of Damascus (c. 842 – 806 BCE) as the author, the Damascan king who fought a great war against Israel and Judah. Apparently the coalition that had been forged between Ahab and Hadadezer, who had provided the main force that stopped the Assyrian king Shalmaneser III at the Battle of Qarqar, had fallen apart under their successors and in the succeeding war between Israel-Judah against Aram-Damascus the kings of Israel and Juda were killed. Jehu, already an important military leader, then became king after this event.

=== Black Obelisk ===
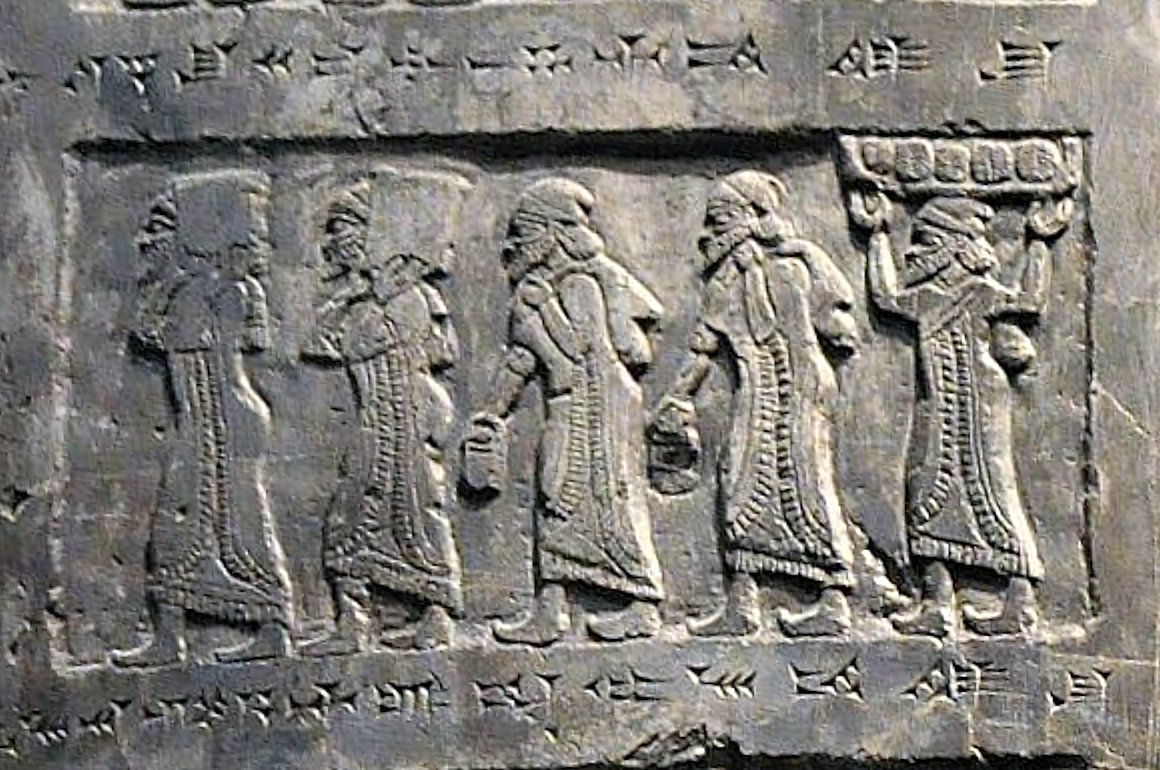
Part of the gift-bearing delegation of King Jehu, Black Obelisk, 841–840 BCE.

Aside from the Hebrew Scriptures, Jehu appears in Assyrian documents, notably in the Black Obelisk, where he is depicted as kissing the ground in front of Shalmaneser III and presenting a gift (maddattu ša Ia-ú-a ... kaspu mâdu "tribute of Jehu ... much silver"). In the Assyrian documents, Jehu is simply called "son of Omri" (Akkadian: mār Ḫumri, possibly expressing his having been the ruler of "the House of Omri", a later Assyrian designation for the Kingdom of Israel), but since his grandfather Nimshi might have been a son of Omri, it could have been just describing a well-known descendency. This tribute is dated ca. 841 BCE by a fragment from Calah. It is the earliest preserved depiction of an Israelite. One more argument that Jehu was or styled himself as a descendent of Omri is the fact that he moved the capital back to Samaria, which was the capital in Omri's days.

According to the Obelisk, Jehu severed his alliances with Phoenicia and Judah, and became subject to Assyria. Apparently, faced with the aggression of Aram-Damascus in the north and the rebellion of the Moabites (see Mesha stele) in the east, Jehu had no options other than yielding to the Assyrians, who would resume their attacks on Aram-Damascus, thus relieving the pressure on Israel.

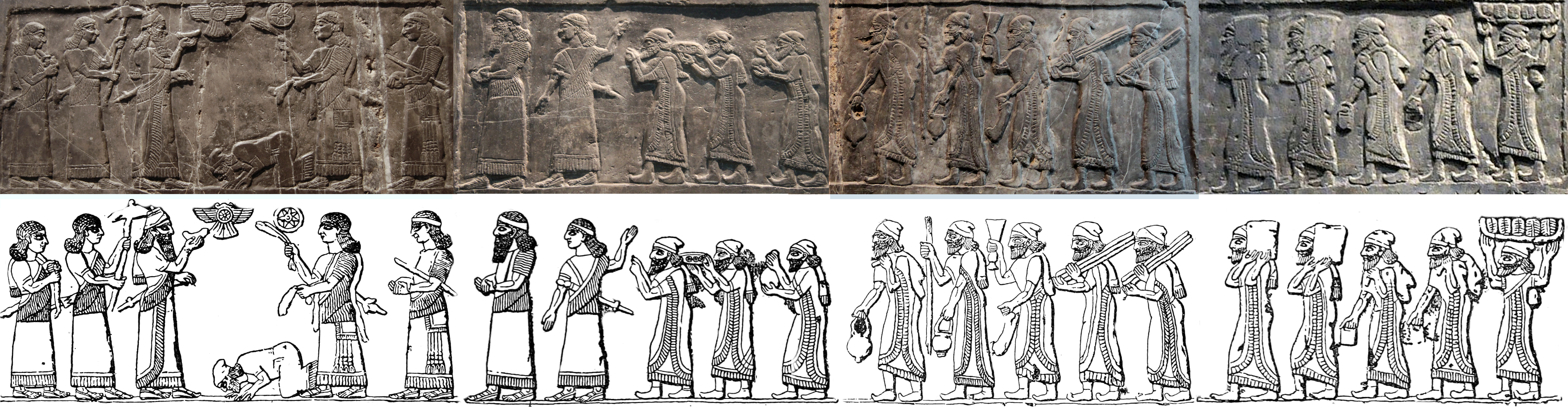
Black Obelisk, Jehu's delegation to Shalmaneser III

== In popular culture ==
Jehu is portrayed by George Nader in the film Sins of Jezebel (1953).

Drive Like Jehu was an American post-hardcore band from San Diego active from 1990 to 1995. The band's name was derived from 2 Kings 9:20: "And the watchman told, saying, He came even unto them, and cometh not again: and the driving [is] like the driving of Jehu the son of Nimshi; for he driveth furiously".

== See also ==
- List of biblical figures identified in extra-biblical sources

== Notes ==
Jehu House of Omri; Contemporary King of Judah: Ahaziah, Athaliah, Jehoash/Joash
Regnal titles
| Preceded by Jehoram | King of Israel; 841–814 BCE | Succeeded by Jehoahaz |
