= Nimshi =

Character in the Hebrew Bible

Nimshi (Hebrew: נִמְשִׁי Nīmšī; Latin and Douay–Rheims: Namsi) is a character in the Hebrew Bible. She is mentioned in the Books of Kings and the Second Book of Chronicles as ancestor or possibly a mother of Jehu, the king of the Northern Kingdom of Israel (compare 1 Kings 19:16; 2 Kings 9:20; 2 Chronicles 22:7 with 2 Kings 9:2, 14).

== History ==
The Hebrew word ben (בֶּן) can mean both a literal "son", or a male descendant. The biblical text describes Jehu as either the "son of Nimshi" (ben Nimshi); or as the "son of Jehoshaphat" (ben Yehoshafat), who is himself called the "son of Nimshi". Some scholars have therefore taken the phrase to mean that Jehu was not the actual son of Nimshi, and that Nimshi was the maternal ancestor of Jehu, or even that Jehu belonged to a clan named Nimshi. Another possibility is that "son of Jehoshaphat" was a later addition, in which case Nimshi would be the mother of Jehu.

References to the name Nimshi have been discovered in 9th century BCE inscriptions from Tel Rehov and other archaeological sites. Thus, archaeologists Shmuel Aḥituv and Amihai Mazar have suggested that a clan named after Nimshi may have been a prominent elite family in the Beth Shean Valley region when Jehu, a member of that clan, rose to the throne of Israel.

Baruchi-Unna suggests that Nimshi was a child of King Omri and a sibling of King Ahab. Jehu's father, Jehoshaphat, would consequently be a first cousin to Ahab's children: Ahaziah of Israel, Jehoram of Israel, and Athaliah, Queen regnant of the Kingdom of Judah. Among the members of this extended House of Omri, the names Ahaziah, Jehoram, Athaliah, and Jehoshaphat are all Yahwistic theophoric names, whereas Omri, Ahab, and Nimshi are not theophoric names. According to Baruchi-Unna, this reflects different religious tendencies among the first and second generations of the royal family, and the (evidently) Yahweh-worshipping third generation.
