= Jehonadab =

Character in 2 Kings, son of Rechab

Jehonadab (Hebrew: יְהוֹנָדָב; "YHWH is willing"; Latin: Jonadab) was the son of Rechab. He is mentioned in 2 Kings 10:15-31. A Kenite, he was a supporter of Jehu, son of Nimshi, in the elimination of the house of Ahab and in suppressing worship of Baal throughout Samaria. Jehu seeks his support at a meeting in the desert and assures Jehonadab of his "zeal for the Lord".

In the Book of Jeremiah he is called both Jehonadab and Jonadab.

He prohibited his followers from drinking alcohol, and is credited with founding the Rechabites. He also commanded that they live in tents, rather than houses. At Jeremiah 35:6-19, his followers are commended for adhering to his instructions, and God promises that his lineage will continue.

== Jehovah's Witnesses ==
Jehovah's Witnesses use the terms Jonadabs or Jehonadabs to refer to Christians who hope to live forever on earth, rather than in heaven. The term was first used in this way in the early 1930s, though it is now used less frequently; Jehovah's Witnesses now usually use the terms great crowd (people who survive Armageddon) and other sheep (Armageddon survivors and others resurrected later).

Witnesses believe that exactly 144,000 men and women will reign with Jesus Christ in heaven, out of all Christians who have died since Jesus' resurrection. They refer to these as the anointed or spiritual Israel, and those still living are referred to as the remnant. Witnesses believe that, in a similar manner to Jehonadab, as a non-Jew, assisting Jehu, the Jonadab class assists spiritual Israel. The August 15, 1934 The Watchtower stated:

The Jonadab class are of those who ‘hear’ the message of truth and who must say to those in their hearing: ‘Come. And let him that heareth say, Come. And let him that is athirst come. And whosoever will, let him take the water of life freely.’ (Rev. 22:17) Those of the Jonadab class must go along with those who are of the antitypical Jehu company, that is, the anointed, and announce the message of the kingdom, even though they are not the anointed witnesses of Jehovah.

— As quoted in "“Let Anyone Hearing Say: ‘Come!’”", The Watchtower, December 15, 1990, page 13

Witness also use the more consistent meaning of Jehonadab as "Jehovah is willing."

== See also ==
- List of bible names starting with J
