= Prewitt–Allen Archaeological Museum =

Museum in Salem, Oregon

Coordinates: 44.8823°N 122.9609°W

Prewitt-Allen Archeological Museum
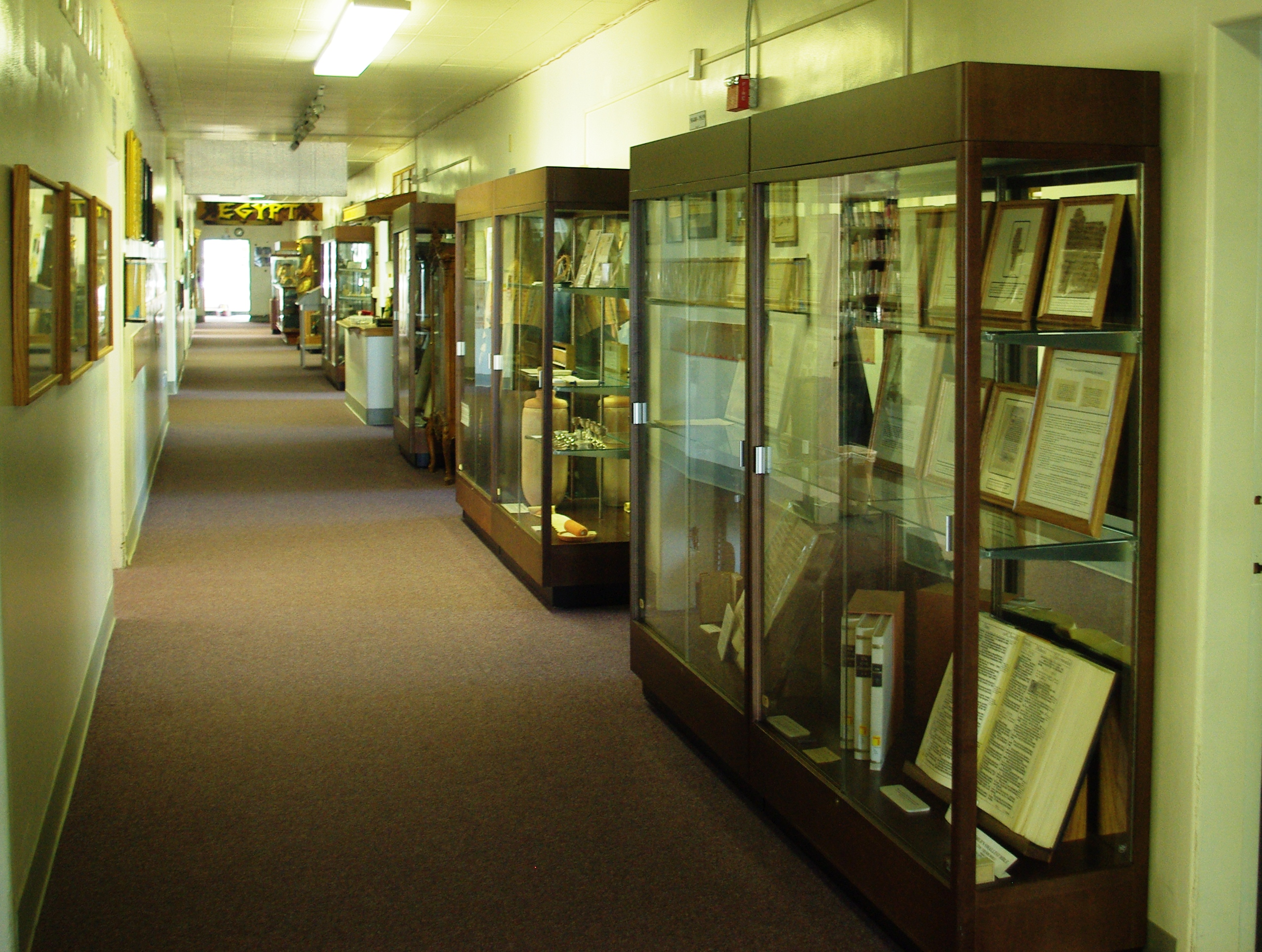
- Display cases at the museum
- Established: 1950s
- Location: Salem, Oregon, USA
- Type: archaeology
- Curator: Adrian Jeffers
- Website: www.corban.edu/museum/

The Prewitt-Allen Archeological Museum is an archaeology museum at Corban University in Salem, Oregon, United States. Founded in the 1950s, the museum is located in the school’s library on the rural campus. Artifacts and replicas come mainly from the Eastern Mediterranean and include replicas of the Rosetta Stone and the Code of Hammurabi, alongside a collection of ancient oil lamps and an internationally known papyrus palimpsest. The free museum has over 900 items in its collections.

== History ==
Robert Allen began a push for a museum in 1953 at what was then Western Baptist Bible College when the school located in California. He thought the artifacts could assist in his classroom teachings. That same year he bought a fragment of papyrus from the 5th century A.D., which is now known as the Allen Papyrus. In 1964, Allen began a seven year tour around the world including stops in 39 countries from the Middle East to Europe. During this journey he collected artifacts for the museum, returning to the college in May 1971.

Originally the museum was named the Robert S. Allen Archaeology Museum. The museum loaned out the Allen Papyrus to the California Institute of Technology in 1975 for research using the software used to reduce static on pictures coming from the Mariner probes sent to Mars and other planets. The research was to study how to better view the writings that had been erased from the original papyrus when it was reused by later scribes. The collection at the museum grew to around 600 pieces by 1998. Adrian Jeffers took over as curator that same year. In March 2008, the museum acquired a full-scale replica of King Tut’s mask. In late 2008, a mid-19th century Torah scroll valued at $90,000 was donated to the museum. The tanned leather scroll stands 17 inches (430 mm) tall and came from what is now Iraq. The museum’s collection had grown to more than 900 pieces in 2009.

== Collections ==
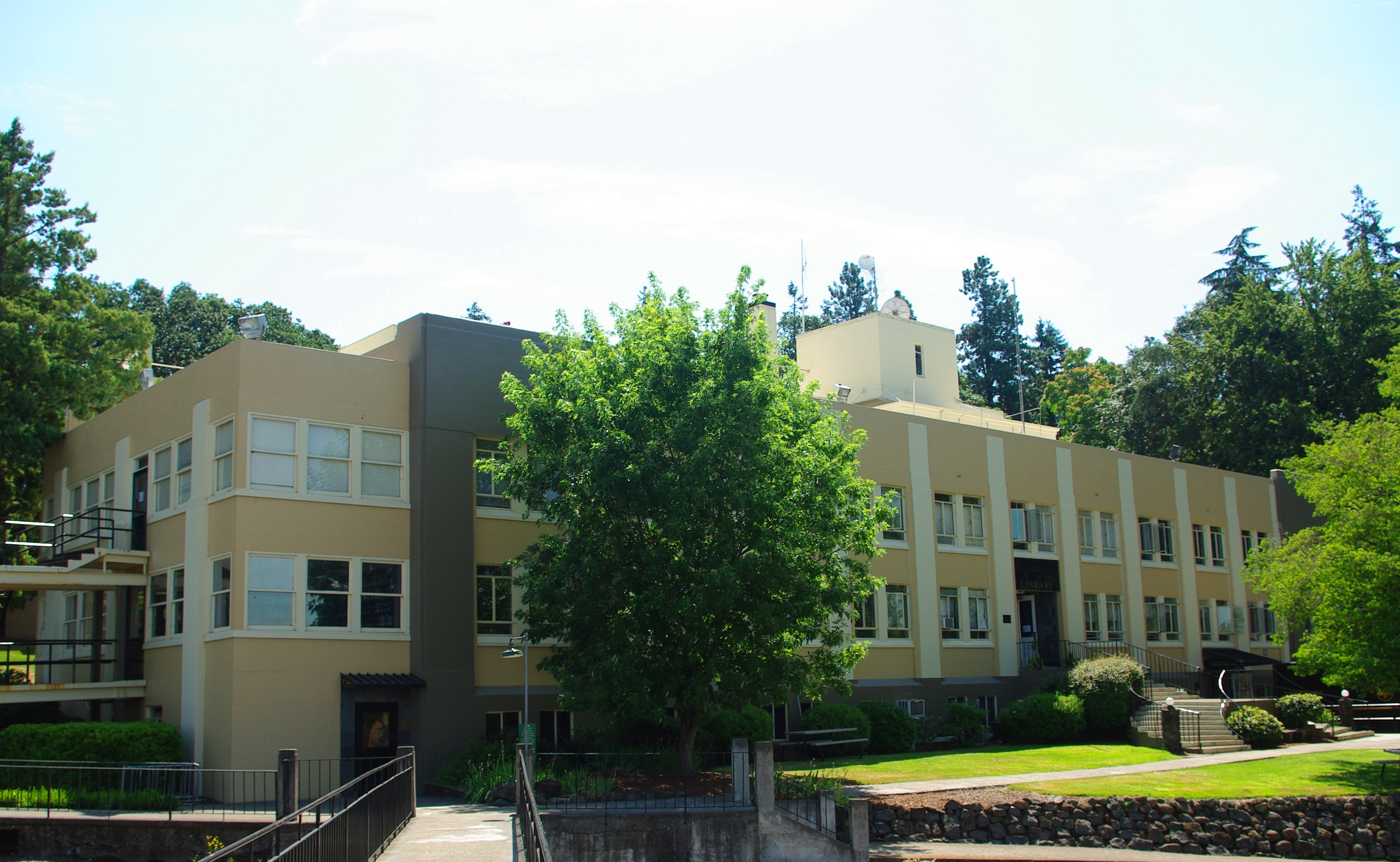
Corban's library houses the museum

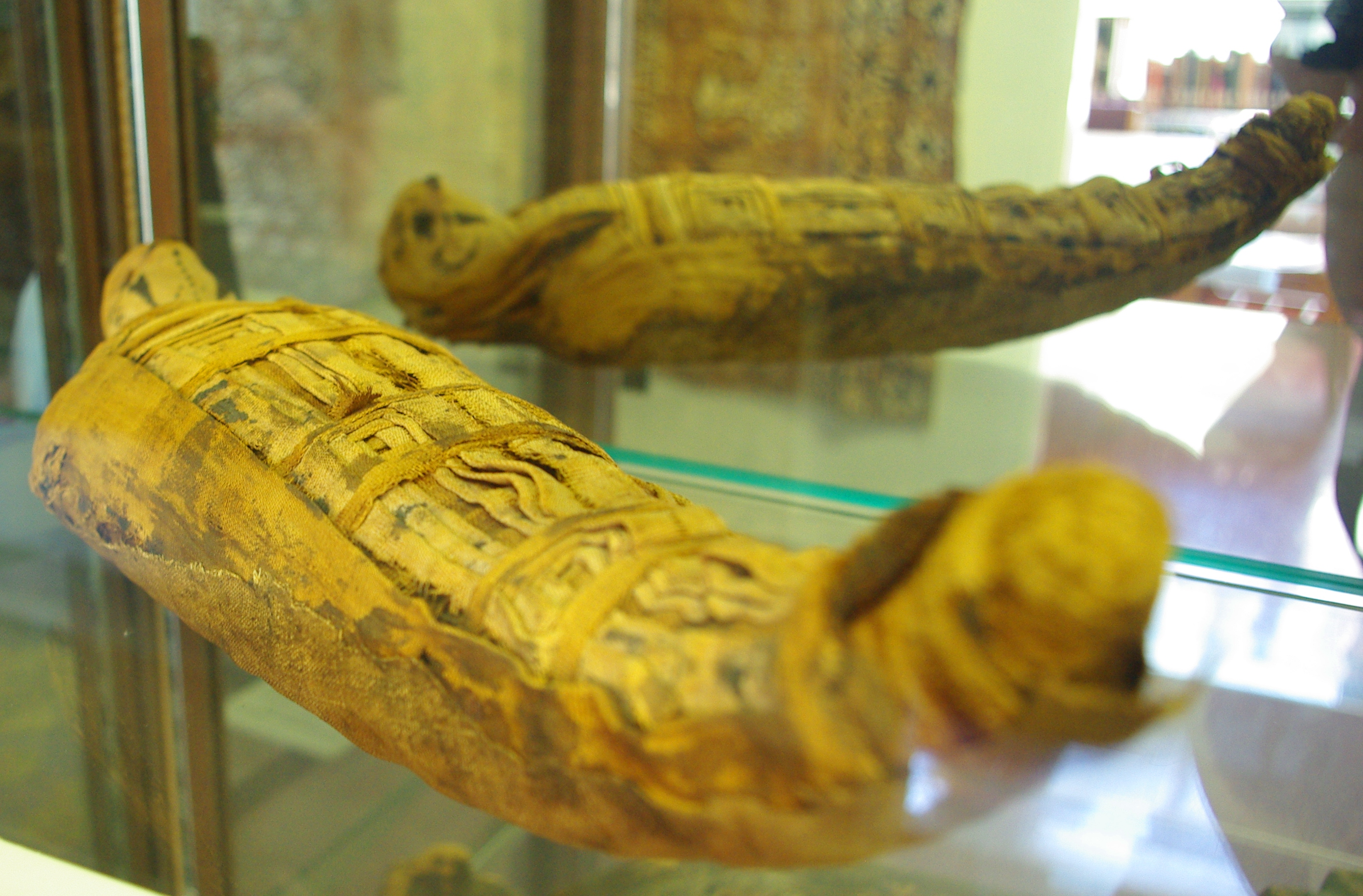
Mummified falcon on display at the museum

The Prewitt–Allen Archaeological Museum is situated inside Corban University's library. Located on the second floor, the displays line the hallway of the library. The museum is open the same hours as the library, with free admission. Artifacts in the collections come primarily from the region around the Eastern Mediterranean Sea. This includes the modern nations of Greece, Turkey, Lebanon, Israel, Iraq, and Egypt among others, as well as the ancient lands of Sumeria, Mesopotamia and Palestine. According to the museum it is the only museum of its kind between Vancouver, B.C. and San Francisco.

The museum includes a collection of oil lamps that date back as far as the Bronze Age. This collection shows the evolution of the lamp and includes newer versions dating from the Iron Age and Medieval times. Other everyday items held by the museum include hand tools, scrapers, pottery, arrowheads, tear bottles, cups (including a kylix), perfume bottles, coins, and clay tablet writings. These pieces demonstrate what life was like in antiquity in Egypt, Greece, Palestine, and Mesopotamia.

A palimpsest parchment from around 700 A.D. is the most prized piece in the museum’s collection. Palimpsests are documents whose original text was erased and a new recording was written over the older text. This artifact has Coptic writings concerning the Wisdom of Solomon overwriting older writings of a glossary of Virgil’s Georgics written in Greek. Known as the Allen Papyrus or Allen Palimpsest, the original writings date from the 5th century A.D., and is named after the museum founder who acquired it in Egypt.

The museum’s other significant pieces date back as far as 3000 BC. Pottery shards dating to this time are the oldest pieces in the collection. Other pottery pieces include a tablet from 2700 B.C. written in Samarian that came from Beersheba to items as recent as the 1st century AD. Another is an Amphora that came from a shipwreck in the Mediterranean Sea.

Other items on display include several related to mummification in ancient Egypt. One is a display of alabaster Canopic jars used for storing the internal organs of mummies that are in the shape of a gorilla. Another is a mummy of falcon that dates back to 1500 BC. This includes a casket, with the falcon wrapped up into the shape of Osiris, an Egyptian god.

Prewitt/Allen includes several large replicas in its collections. This includes a full-size copy of the Rosetta Stone that was cast from a mold created from the original. Another replica is of the Code of Hammurabi that stands 6 feet (1.8 m) tall. The copy is based on the law of the Babylonian King and is inscribed into black basalt. Other replicas include the Obelisk of Shalmaneser, jewelry of Queen Nefertiti, and a gold bust of the Pharaoh Tutankhamun. In addition to artifacts, the museum has copies of all the pages of the New Testament from all the main manuscripts of that work.

== Namesakes ==
The museum is named after the Robert S. Allen and Frank Prewitt. Both helped found the museum in the 1950s at the college when it was located in El Cerrito, California. Prewitt was a professor of Bible at the college for 50 years. Allen was a postal carrier, amateur archeologist, and an adjunct instructor in archaeology at the college from 1956 to 1969.
