= Joseph Wolff =

German Jewish Christian missionary (1795–1862)

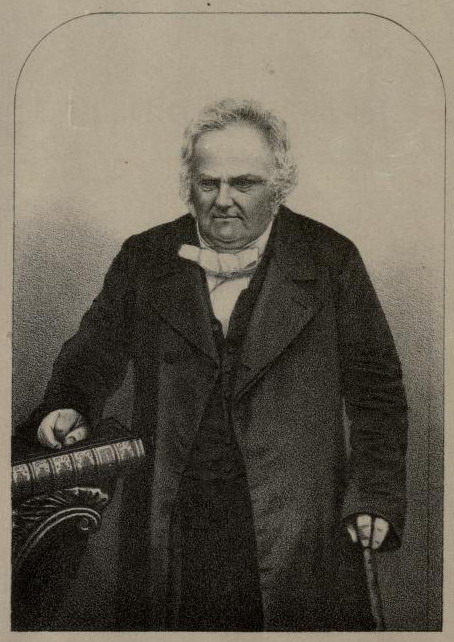
Joseph Wolff, From Travels and adventures of the Rev. Joseph Wolff. London, 1861

Joseph Wolff (1795 – 2 May 1862) was an Anglican missionary born in Weilersbach, near Bamberg, Germany, named Wolff after his paternal grandfather. He travelled widely, and was known as "the missionary to the world". He published several journals of his expeditions, including Travels and Adventures of Joseph Wolff (2 vols, London, 1860).

Portrait of Joseph Wolff from Narrative of a mission to Bokhara, in the years 1843-1845, to ascertain the fate of Colonel Stoddart and Captain Conolly. London, 1846.

Portrait of Joseph Wolff from Researches and missionary labours among the Jews, Mohammedans, and other sects. Philadelphia, 1837.

== Early life ==
Wolff was born to David Wolff (b. 1760) and his wife Esther Mayer in 1795. David Wolff became a rabbi in Weilersbach in 1794, and also served in Kissingen, Halle upon Saale and Uehlfeld, moving to Jebenhausen, Württemberg in 1806, whence he sent his son to the Lutheran lyceum at Stuttgart. According to Edward Gelles, Wolff's mother was a granddaughter of the famous kabbalist, Jacob Frank, who became the leader of the frankist movement in Poland.

Wolff's initial interest in Christianity came about through hearing conversations between his father and Jewish friends, but since he was not happy with his father's concept of Jesus, he began standing outside churches and listening to the sermons. In his writings (written in the third person), Wolff told about his early conviction that Jesus is the Messiah:

When only seven years old, he was boasting to an aged Christian neighbour of the future triumph of Israel at the advent of the Messiah, when the old man said kindly, 'Dear boy, I will tell you who the real Messiah was: he was Jesus of Nazareth, whom your ancestors crucified, as they slew the prophets of old. Go home and read the fifty-third chapter of Isaiah, and you will be convinced that Jesus Christ is the Son of God.' Conviction at once fastened upon him. He went home and read the scripture, wondering to see how perfectly it had been fulfilled in Jesus of Nazareth. Were the words of the Christian true? The boy asked of his father an explanation of the prophecy, but was met with a silence so stern that he never again dared to refer to the subject. This however only increased his desire to know more of the Christian religion.

At the age of 11, a conversation with a Christian neighbour led to Wolff's decision to leave home in order to find truth for himself, resulting in six years of travel, visiting various Christian establishments and learned theologians and teachers, including Christian Frederick of Stolberg-Wernigerode. He became a Roman Catholic near Prague in September 1812, taking on the name Joseph. Four years later, he arrived in Rome, where he began training as a missionary at the seminary of the Collegio Romano. His behaviour led to him being escorted from the Holy City in 1818 at night by gendarmes, for attacking the doctrine of infallibility and criticizing his tutors.

During his time in Rome, Wolff had met Henry Drummond, and he received an invitation from Drummond to join him in England. Through Drummond Wolff was introduced to Lewis Way, whose conviction that Christ's Second Coming was imminent influenced him. He decided to become a member of the Church of England, following which Drummond and Way persuaded him to train as a missionary at Cambridge University, at the expense of The London Society for Promoting Christianity amongst the Jews.

== Travels ==
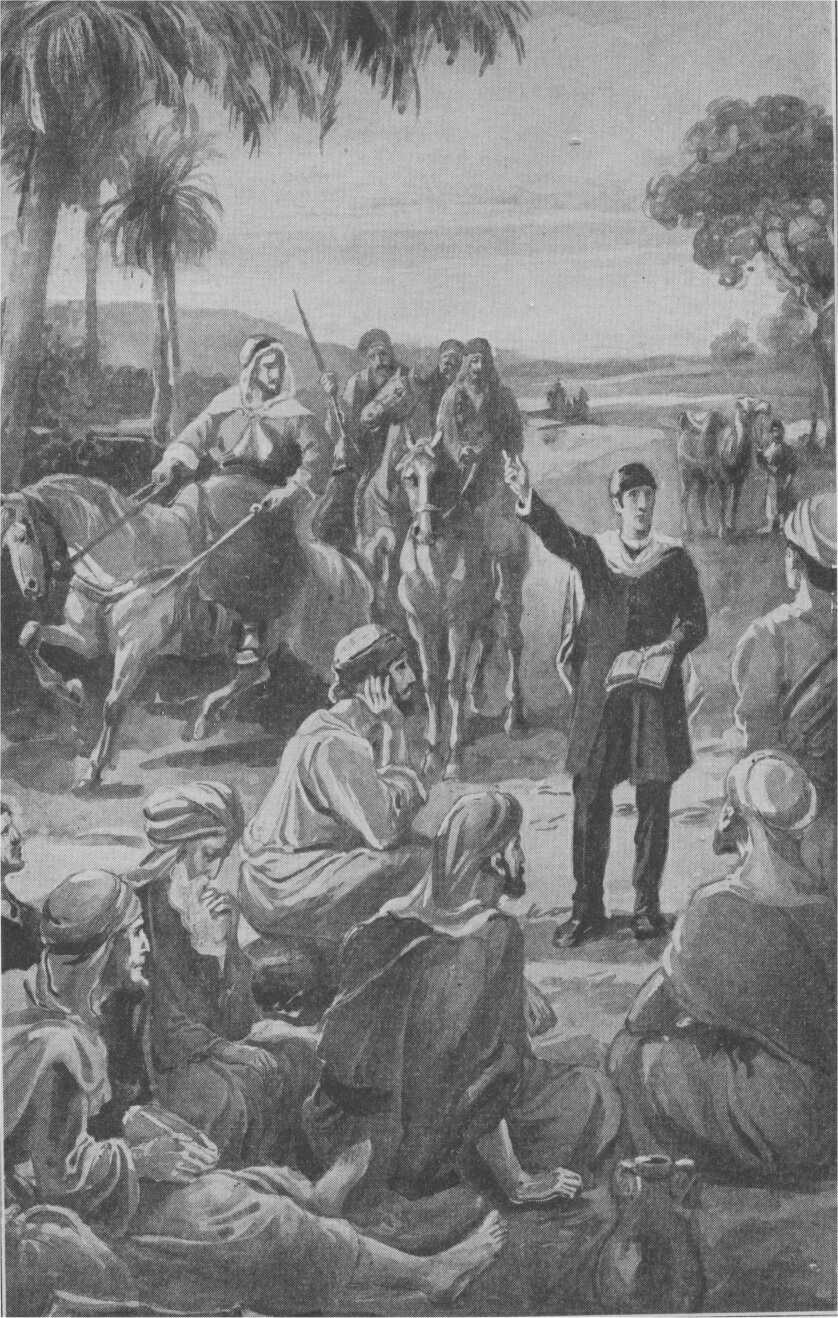
Joseph Wolff preaching in Palestine

Soon after returning to England, Joseph accepted an invitation from Drummond and Way to join some of the most eminent Adventist thinkers of the time, including Edward Irving, at Drummond's country estate, Albury Park, for the first of a series of conferences dedicated to the study of Biblical prophecy.

A year later, Joseph embarked on a search for the Lost Tribes of Israel and second missionary journey and to the east which lasted from 1827–1834, and involved visits to Anatolia, Armenia, Turkestan Afghanistan, Kashmir, Simla, Calcutta, Madras, Mashed, Pondicherry, Tinnevelly, Goa and Bombay, returning via Egypt and Malta. It was during this journey that he mentioned his belief concerning the return of Christ, fixing on the year 1847. In Loodhiana, India, he "preached extempore on the second coming of our Lord Jesus Christ", and a year later in Madras, he was invited to lecture on "the personal reign of Christ, and state his proofs for believing that Christ would come again upon the earth in 1847." Concerning the exact year, in 1852, Joseph's good friend Sir Charles Napier reminded him that "in 1827 you told me that the world would come to an end in 1845", and Joseph himself had once written in relation to his settling on 1847, that "if now an opponent were to ask Wolff, 'why did you fix that time', he has but one answer to give, which he candidly gives to every one, 'because I was a great ass'".

In 1836, he found Samuel Gobat in Ethiopia, who took him to Jeddah, and visited Yemen and Bombay. He continued to the United States, where he was ordained deacon on 26 September 1837 at Newark, New Jersey. Trinity College Dublin awarded him an honorary Doctorate of Laws. Wolff was ordained as a priest in 1838 by Richard Mant, Bishop of Down and Connor. In the same year, he was given the rectory of Linthwaite in Yorkshire.

In his travels in Bukhara, he found the doctrine of the Lord's soon coming held by a remote and isolated people. The Arabs of Hodeyda, he says, "are in possession of a book called 'Seera,' which gives notice of the coming of Christ and His reign in glory, and they expect great events to take place in the year 1840". "In Yemen I spent six days with the Rechabites. They drink no wine, plant no vineyards, sow no seed, live in tents, and remember the words of Jonadab, the son of Rechab. With them were the children of Israel of the tribe of Dan ... who expect, in common with the children of Rechab, the speedy arrival of the Messiah in the clouds of heaven."

In 1843 Wolff went to Bukhara (home of the Bukharan Jews) to seek two British officers, Lieutenant Colonel Charles Stoddart and Captain Arthur Conolly, who had been captured by the Emir, Nasrullah Khan in June 1842. He learned that they had been executed, and he was spared death himself only because the Emir laughed uncontrollably at Wolff's appearance in full canonical garb. His Narrative of this mission sold well and was printed in seven editions between 1845 and 1852. Fitzroy Maclean, then a junior diplomat travelling incognito, retraced Wolff's trip in 1938. He wrote of Wolff in his memoir, Eastern Approaches. Almost fifty years later, Maclean contributed a foreword to a biography of the missionary.

When Joseph arrived in Mashad in late August 1844 on his return from Bukhara he noted, "It is remarkable that dissenters in doctrine are now prevailing largely in the Mohammadan religion" and that "there had arisen there another partly, who may be called the Mohammadan tractarians". At that time, the Shaykhi branch of Islam in Persia was experiencing a growing Adventist movement in parallel to that taking place in Christian circles in North America, Britain and Europe. According to Islamic prophecy the Promised Mahdi would appear in the year 1260, which is 1844 in the Gregorian calendar. It was in Shiraz, during May 1844, that Siyyid 'Alí Muḥammad Shírází declared Himself to be the Báb, the Gate, the Promised Mahdi.

== Personal life and legacy ==
He met his first wife in 1826 through Edward Irving, who introduced him to Lady Georgiana Mary Walpole, daughter of Horatio Walpole, 2nd Earl of Orford, and a descendant of Robert Walpole, the first Prime Minister of Great Britain; the couple were married on 26 February 1827.

In 1845, he was presented to the vicarage of Isle Brewers, Somerset. He raised the funds to rebuild All Saints Church, Isle Brewers by 1861. After the death of his first wife on 16 January 1859, in May 1861, he married Louisa Decima, daughter of James King, rector of St Peter le Poer, London. He was planning another great missions tour when he died at Isle Brewers on 2 May 1862.

A patron when he was a young man was the eccentric politician, Henry Drummond, a member of the Catholic Apostolic Church. Wolff named his son Henry Drummond Wolff; the boy grew up to be a noted diplomat and Conservative politician who founded the Primrose League.

== Works ==
- Missionary journal and memoir of the Rev. Joseph Wolff, written by himself; revised and edited by John Bayford. London, J. Duncan, 1824. Further editions: 1827, 1829.
- Researches and missionary labours among the Jews, Mohammedans, and other sects. London, J. Nisbet & Co., 1835. Reprints:
  - Philadelphia, O. Rogers, 1837
- Journal of the Rev. Joseph Wolff ...: In a Series of Letters to Sir Thomas Baring, Bart. : Containing an Account of His Missionary Labours from the Years 1827 to 1831 : and from the Years 1835 to 1838. London, James Burns, 1839.
- Narrative of a mission to Bokhara, in the years 1843–1845, to ascertain the fate of Colonel Stoddart and Captain Conolly. London, J.W. Parker, 1845. First and second (revised) edition both came out in 1845. Volume 1Volume 2

Reprints:

  - New York, Harper & Bros., 1845
  - Edinburgh and London, William Blackwood & Sons, 1848
  - New York, Arno Press, 1970 ISBN 0-405-03072-X
  - Elibron Classics, 2001, ISBN 1-4021-6116-6
  - A mission to Bokhara. Edited and abridged with an introduction by Guy Wint. London, Routledge & K. Paul, 1969. ISBN 0-7100-6456-X
- Travels and adventures of the Rev. Joseph Wolff, D.D., LL. D: Vicar of Ile Brewers, near Taunton; and late missionary to the Jews and Muhammadans in Persia, Bokhara, Cashmeer, etc. London, Saunders, Otley and Co., 1861.
