= Musri =

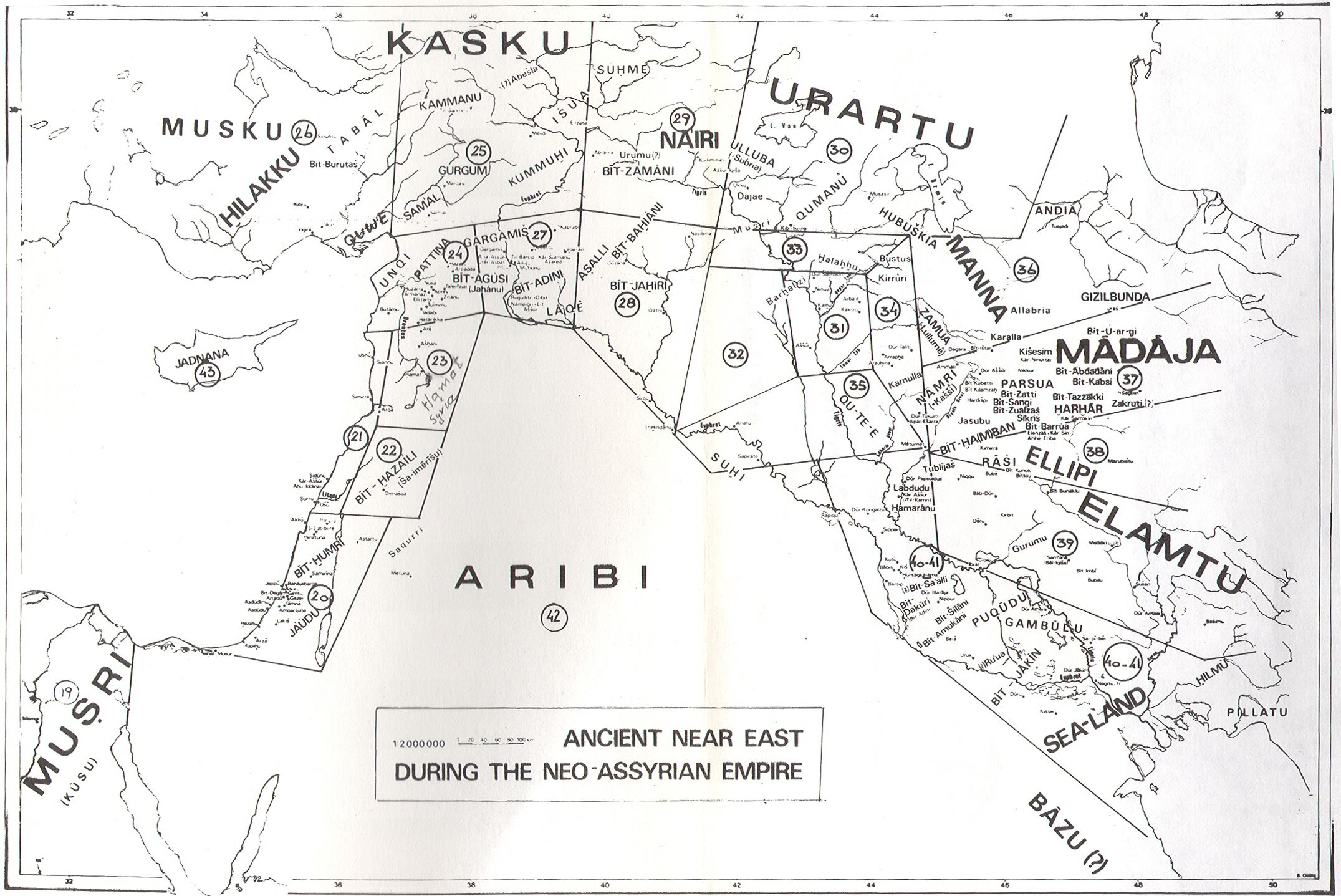
33 — Musri

Musri (Assyrian: Mu-us-ri), or Muzri, was a small ancient kingdom, in northern areas of Iraqi Kurdistan. The area is now inhabited by Muzuri Kurds.

Musri is also a geographical name mentioned in several Neo-Assyrian inscriptions and referring to ancient Egypt, and not to a country in northern Arabia as once believed.
