= Rechabites =

Biblical clan

The Rechabites (/ˈrɛkəbaɪts/) were a Biblical clan, the descendants of Rechab through Jehonadab.

== Biblical sources and theories ==
The Rechabites adhered to the law laid down by their ancestor Jehonadab, forbidding them to drink wine, to own land or vineyards, or to live in cities. They were commanded to always lead a nomadic life. They were noted for their fidelity to the old established custom of their family in the days of Jeremiah; and this feature of their character is referred to by God for the purpose of giving point to his message to the King of Judah. As a reward for their fidelity, God proclaims that there will always be a descendant of Jonadab in his service.

One theory is the Rechabites belonged to the Kenites, who accompanied the Israelites into the Holy Land and dwelt among them; the sources of information are few and unclear. Kenites dwelt in cities and adopted settled habits of life.

== Claims of descent from the Rechabites ==
The Mekhilta tells a story—presumably dating to the late Second Temple period—of Rechabites, known as "sons of water drinkers" due to their abstention from wine.

Rabbi Halafta (1st–2nd centuries) was a descendant of the Rechabites.

The apocryphal Story of Zosimus, from late antiquity, details the journey of a monk named Zosimus to the "Land of the Rechabites".

In 1839 the Reverend Joseph Wolff found in Yemen, near Sanaa, a tribe claiming to be descendants of Jehonadab; and in the late nineteenth century a Bedouin tribe was found near the Dead Sea who also professed to be descendants of Jehonadab.

Many Muslims still claim descent from Rechab, along with the nearly-universal claim of Arabs to be descended from Abraham through Ishmael (Ismail).

== Similar later groups ==
The term Rechabites also refers to a religious order, similar in some ways to the Nazirites, and they are mentioned by Eusebius of Emesa.

In more recent times, the name has been used by Christian groups keen to promote total abstinence from alcohol, such as the Independent Order of Rechabites.

== Online sources ==
- “Rechabites,” Jewish Encyclopedia
- "Rechabites, The" . The New Student's Reference Work . 1914.
