= Kings of Israel and Judah =

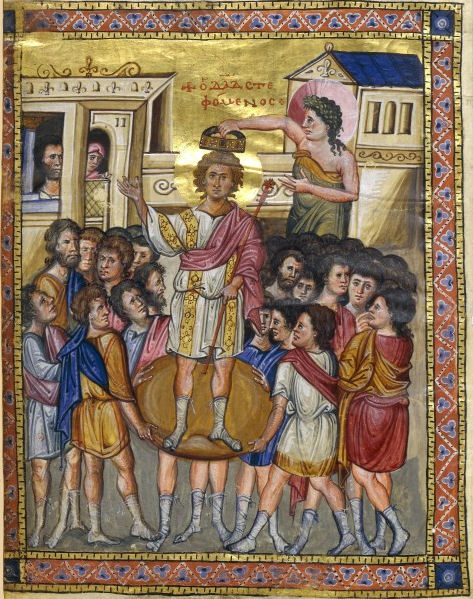
Coronation of David, as depicted in the Paris Psalter.

The article addresses the biblical and historical kings of the Land of Israel: Abimelech of Sichem, the three kings of the United Kingdom of Israel and those of its successor states, Israel and Judah, followed in the Second Temple period, part of classical antiquity, by the kingdoms ruled by the Hasmonean and Herodian dynasties.

The Hebrew Bible describes a succession of kings of the United Kingdom of Israel and then of divided kingdoms: Israel and Judah.

In contemporary scholarship, the united monarchy is debated due to a lack of archaeological evidence. It is generally accepted that a "House of David" existed, but some scholars believe that David could have been only the king or chieftain of Judah, which was likely small, and that the northern kingdom was a separate development. There are some dissenters to this view, including those who support the traditional narrative, and those who support the united monarchy's existence but believe that the Bible contains theological exaggerations.

== Overview tables ==
=== Kings and prophets ===
Table: kings and prophets

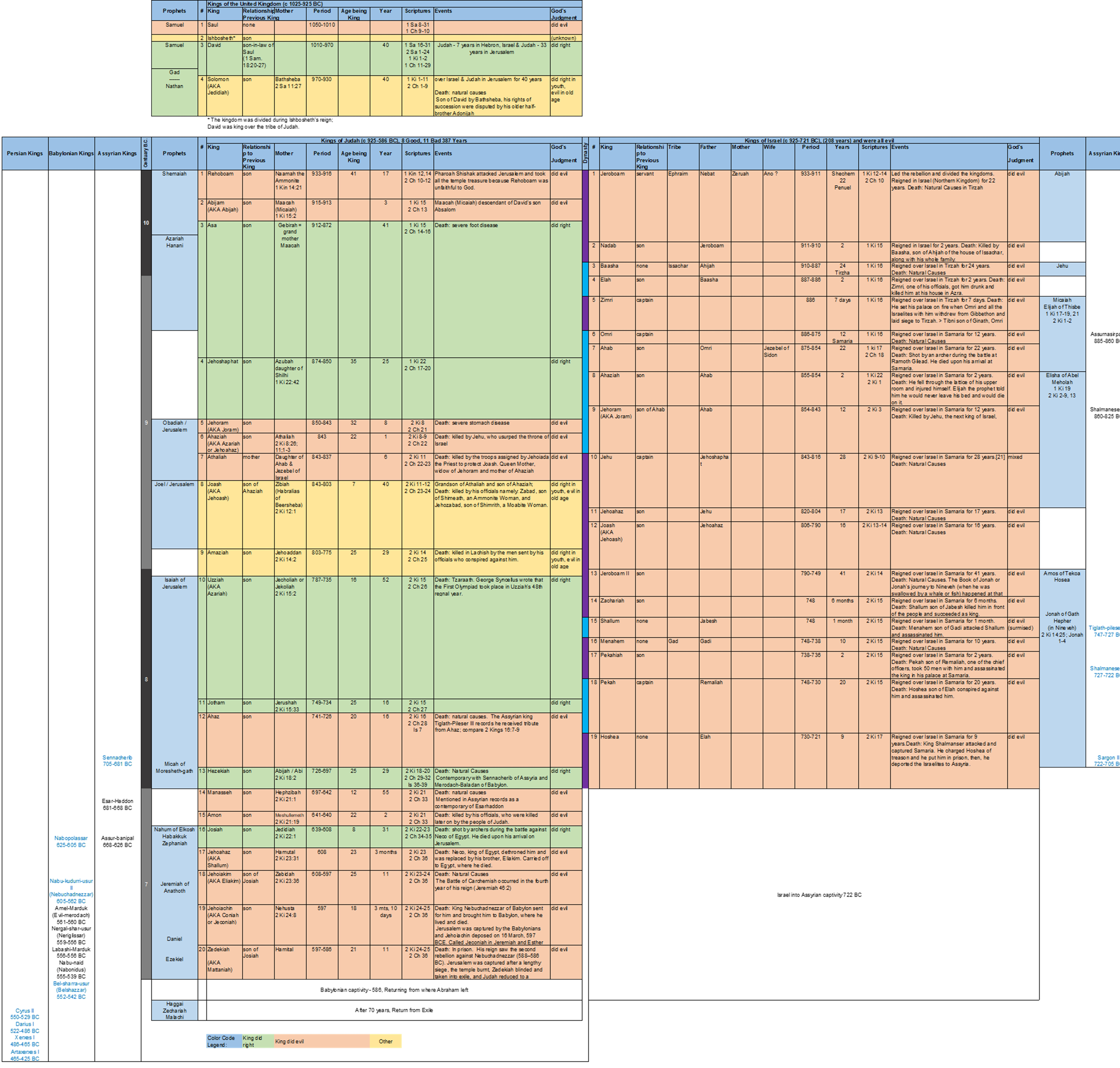

This table describes the kings, their parents, the ages at which they lived, the prophets who influenced them, and the emperors they encountered in battle.

=== Diagrams, Saul to Zedekiah ===
Summary diagram

Family tree

Saul; King of the United Monarchy: r. 1050–1012 BCE
Eshbaal (Ishbosheth); King of the United Monarchy: r. 1012–1010 BCE
Bathsheba | David; King of the United Monarchy: r. 1010–970 BCE | Maacah
Naamah | Solomon; King of the United Monarchy: r. 970–931 BCE | Absalom | Jeroboam; King of Israel: r. 931–910 BCE
Rehoboam; King of Judah: r. 931–913 BCE | Uriel | Nadab; King of Israel: r. 910–909 BCE | Baasha; King of Israel: r. 909–886 BCE
Maacah; Queen Mother of Judah: r. 910–895 BCE | Elah; King of Israel: r. 886–885 BCE
? | Abijam; King of Judah: r. 913–910 BCE | Zimri; King of Israel: r. 885 BCE
{{{Asa}}} | Azubah | Omri; King of Israel: r. 884–874 BCE
Jehoshaphat; King of Judah: r. 870–849 BCE | Jezebel | Ahab; King of Israel: r. 871–852 BCE
Jehoram; King of Judah: r. 849–842 BCE | Athaliah; Queen of Judah: r. 842–835 BCE | Joram; King of Israel: r. 849–837 BCE | Ahaziah; King of Israel: r. 850–849 BCE | Jehu; King of Israel: r. 840—814 BCE
Ahaziah; King of Judah: r. 842–841 BCE | Zibiah | Jehosheba | Jehoiada | Jehoahaz; King of Israel: r. 814—798 BCE
Jehoash; King of Judah: r. 836–796 BCE | Jehoaddan | Jehoash; King of Israel: r. 798—782 BCE
Amaziah; King of Judah: r. 796–767 BCE | Jecoliah | Amoz | Jeroboam II; King of Israel: r. 782—753 BCE
Uzziah; King of Judah: r. 783–742 BCE | Jerusha | Isaiah | Zechariah; King of Israel: r. 753—752 BCE | Shallum; King of Israel: r. 752 BCE
Menahem; King of Israel: r. 752—742 BCE
Jotham; King of Judah: r. 742–735 BCE | ? | Hephzibah
Pekahiah; King of Israel: r. 742—740 BCE | Pekah; King of Israel: r. 740—732 BCE
Ahaz; King of Judah: r. 732–716 BCE | Abijah | Hoshea; King of Israel: r. 732–721 BCE
Hezekiah; King of Judah: r. 716–687 BCE
Manasseh; King of Judah: r. 697–643 BCE | Meshullemeth
Amon; King of Judah: r. 643–610 BCE | Jedidah
Josiah; King of Judah: r. 640–609 BCE
Jehoiakim; King of Judah: r. 609–598 BCE | Nehushta | Jehoahaz; King of Judah: r. 609 BCE | Zedekiah; King of Judah: r. 596–586 BCE
Jehoiachin; King of Judah: r. 598–597 BCE

== Abimelech, son of Gideon ==
- Abimelech, the son of Gideon, was the first man declared a king in the Land of Israel; he ruled from Sichem over the territory of Manasseh.

== House of Saul ==
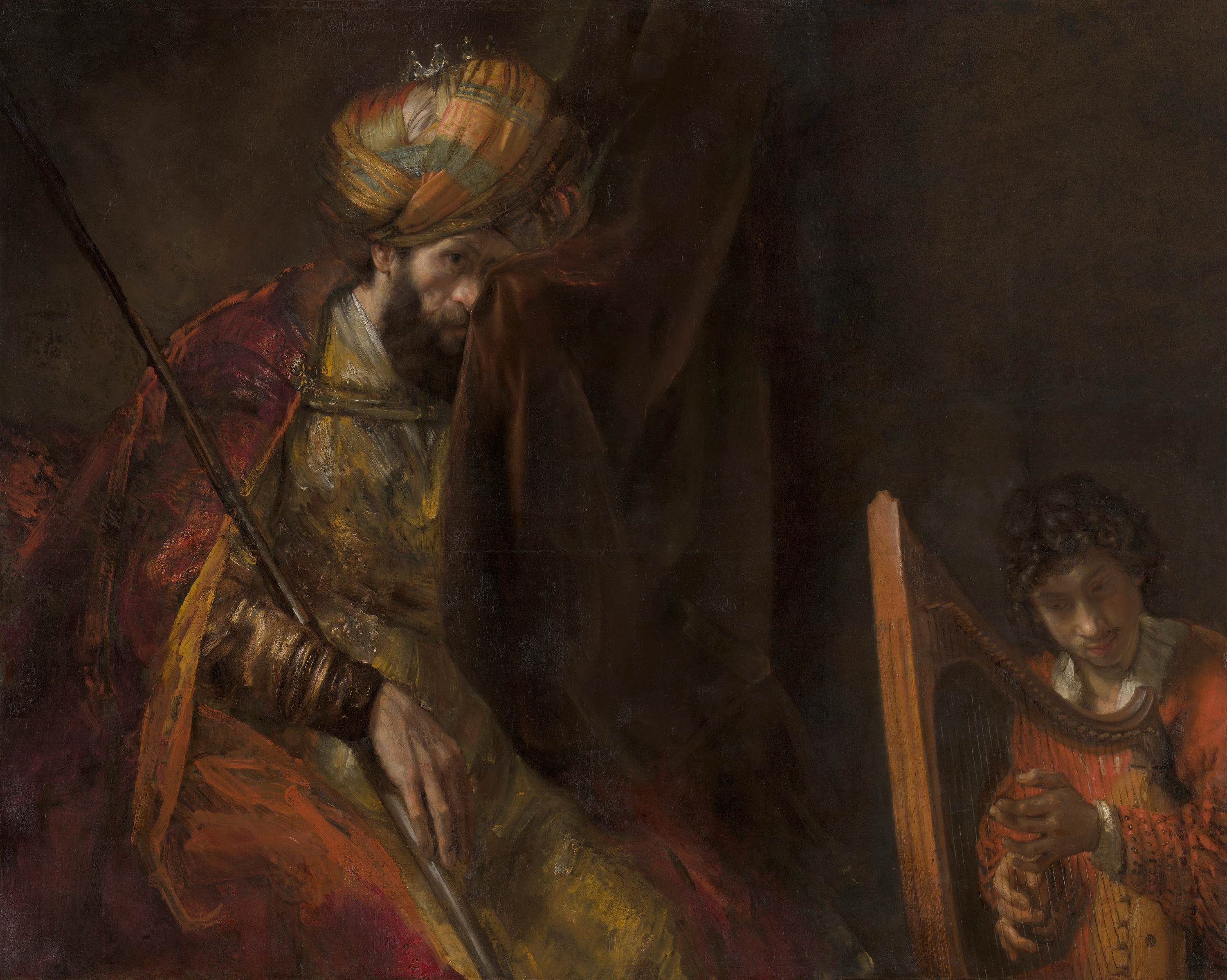
Saul and David by Rembrandt

According to the Bible, the Tribes of Israel lived as a confederation under ad hoc charismatic leaders called judges. Around 1020 BCE, under extreme threat from foreign peoples, the tribes united to form the first United Kingdom of Israel. Samuel anointed Saul from the Tribe of Benjamin as the first king.

- Saul (1020–1000 BCE) or (1040-1000 BCE)
- Ish-bosheth (Esbaal) (1000–998 BCE)

== House of David: united monarchy ==
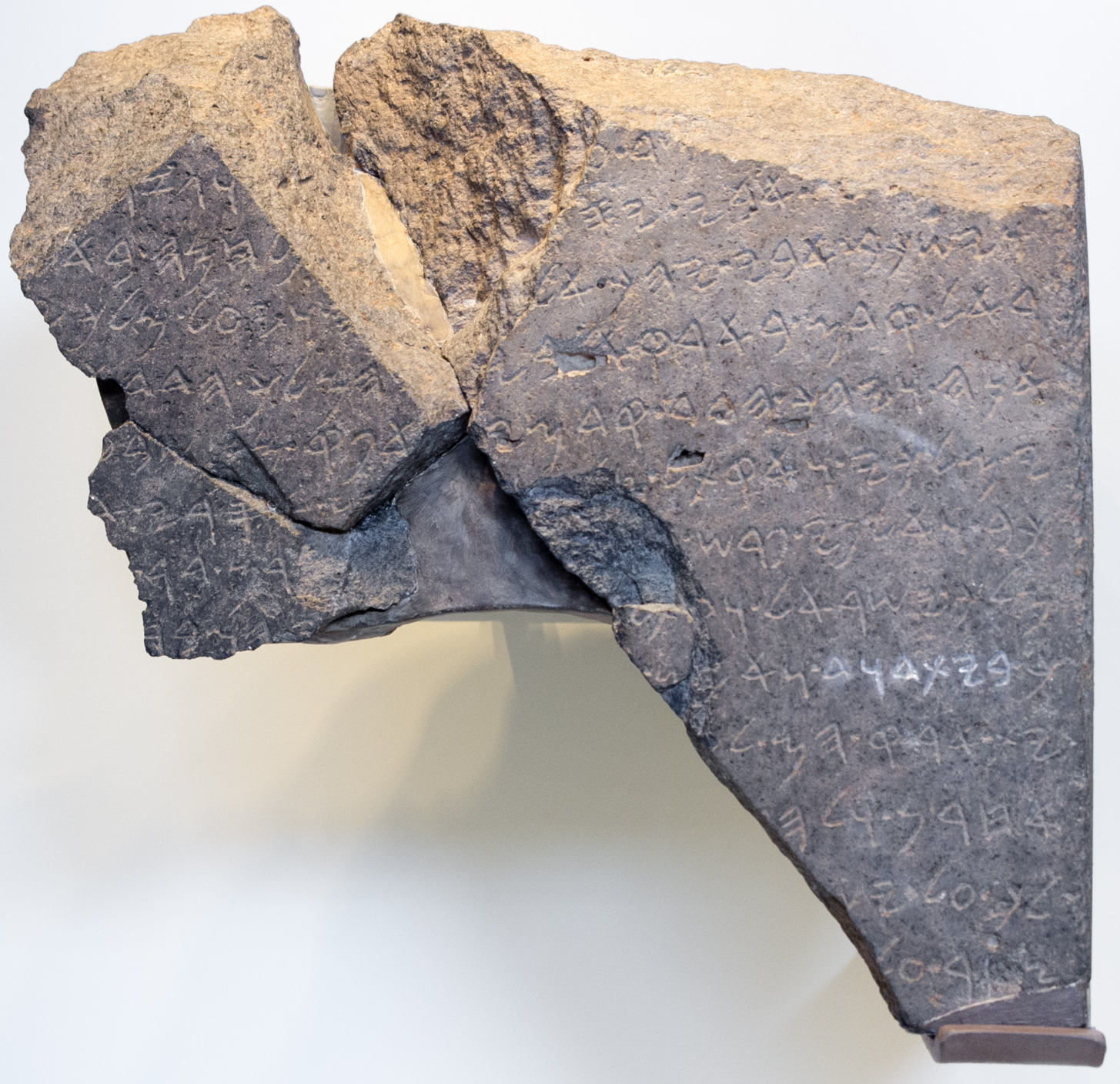
The Tel Dan Stele with reference to the "House of David"

| Albright | Thiele | Galil | Kitchen | Common/ Biblical name | Regnal Name and style | Notes |
|---|---|---|---|---|---|---|
| 1000–962 | | 1010–970 | 1010–970 | David | דוד בן-ישי מלך ישראל David ben Yishai, Melech Yisra'el | Reigned over Judah for 7 years in Hebron, then Israel & Judah in Jerusalem for 33 years; 40 years in total. Death: natural causes |
| 962–922 | | 970–931 | 971–931 | Solomon | שלמה בן-דוד מלך ישראל Shelomo ben David, Melech Yisra'el | Reigned over Israel & Judah in Jerusalem for 40 years. Death: natural causes Son of David by Bathsheba, his rights of succession were disputed by his older half-brother Adonijah |
| 922–915 | 931–913 | 931–914 | 931–915 | Rehoboam | רחבעם בן-שלמה מלך יהודה Rechav'am ben Shlomo, Melech Yehudah | Reigned for 17 years. After 3 years, the kingdom was split into the kingdoms of Judah and Israel. Death: natural causes |

== Separation into two kingdoms ==
After the death of King Solomon the United Kingdom of Israel was divided into two – the northern Kingdom of Israel under Jeroboam, with its capital, first in Shechem, then Penuel, Tirzah, and finally Samaria, and ruled by a series of dynasties beginning with Jeroboam; and the southern Kingdom of Judah with its capital still in Jerusalem and ruled by the House of David. Under Hezekiah's rule in the Kingdom of Judah, the Neo-Assyrian Empire conquered and destroyed the northern kingdom in 722 BCE, leaving only the southern kingdom of Judah.

In biblical narrative, the kings of Israel and Judah are judged by their fidelity to the laws of God (The Torah); on this basis they all belong to one of the categories: the good kings, the bad kings, and the kings who acted both good as well as bad.

All kings of Israel are considered to be bad, except for Jehu who is considered to have acted both good, since he is credited with the suppression of a cult of Baal, as well as bad, since he failed to suppress a cult of golden calves in Bethel and Dan.

Amongst kings of Judah, five of them are judged to have acted good throughout their reign: Asa, Jehoshaphat, Jotham, Hezekiah, and Josiah, whereas Jehoash, Amaziah, Uzziah and Manasseh are all described as kings who acted good as well as bad during their reign. The remaining monarchs are considered to have acted badly throughout their reigns.

== Kingdom of Israel (Samaria) ==
| Albright | Thiele | Galil | Kitchen | Common/Biblical name | Regnal Name and style | Notes |
|---|---|---|---|---|---|---|
=== The House of Jeroboam ===
| 922–901 BCE | 931–910 BCE | 931–909 BCE | 931–911 BCE | Jeroboam I | ירבעם בֵּן-נבט מלך ישראל Yarob'am ben Nevat, Melekh Yisra'el | Led the rebellion and divided the kingdoms. Reigned in Israel (Northern Kingdom) for 22 years. Death: Natural Causes |
| 901–900 BCE | 910–909 BCE | 909–908 BCE | 911–910 BCE | Nadab | נדב בֵּן-ירבעם מלך ישראל Nadav ben Yarob'am, Melekh Yisra'el | Reigned in Israel for 2 years. Death: Killed by Baasha, son of Ahijah of the house of Issachar, along with his whole family. |
=== The House of Baasha ===
| 900–877 BCE | 909–886 BCE | 908–885 BCE | 910–887 BCE | Baasha | בעשא בֵּן-אחיה מלך ישראל Ba'sha ben Achiyah, Melekh Yisra'el | Reigned over Israel in Tirzah for 24 years. Death: Natural Causes |
| 877–876 BCE | 886–885 BCE | 885–884 BCE | 887–886 BCE | Elah | אלה בֵּן-בעשא מלך ישראל 'Ela ben Ba'sha, Melekh Yisra'el | Reigned over Israel in Tirzah for 2 years. Death: Zimri, one of his officials, got him drunk and killed him at his house in Azra. |
=== The House of Zimri ===
| 876 BCE | 885 BCE | 884 BCE | 886 BCE | Zimri | זמרי מלך ישראל Zimri, Melekh Yisra'el | Reigned over Israel in Tirzah for 7 days. Death: He set his palace on fire when Omri and all the Israelites with him withdrew from Gibbethon and laid siege to Tirzah. |
=== The House of Tibni ===
| 876–871 BCE | 885–880 BCE | – | – | Tibni | תבני מלך ישראל Tibni, Melekh Yisra'el | Rival claimant to Omri, reigned for several years. Death: Was apparently killed while assailed by the soldiers of Omri – his death is recorded, but the circumstances surrounding it go unexplained. |
=== The House of Omri ===
| 876–869 BCE | 885–874 BCE | 884–873 BCE | 886–875 BCE | Omri | עמרי מלך ישראל 'Omri, Melekh Yisra'el | Reigned over Israel in Samaria for 12 years. Death: Natural Causes |
| 869–850 BCE | 874–853 BCE | 873–852 BCE | 875–853 BCE | Ahab | אחאב בֵּן-עמרי מלך ישראל Ach'av ben 'Omri, Melekh Yisra'el | Reigned over Israel in Samaria for 22 years. Death: Shot by an archer during the battle at Ramoth Gilead. He died upon his arrival at Samaria. |
| 850–849 BCE | 853–852 BCE | 852–851 BCE | 853–852 BCE | Ahaziah | אחזיהו בֵּן-אחאב מלך ישראל 'Achazyahu ben 'Ach'av, Melekh Yisra'el | Reigned over Israel in Samaria for 2 years. Death: He fell through the lattice of his upper room and injured himself. Elijah the prophet told him he would never leave his bed and would die on it. |
| 849–842 BCE | 852–841 BCE | 851–842 BCE | 852–841 BCE | Joram | יורם בֵּן-אחאב מלך ישראל Yehoram ben 'Ach'av, Melekh Yisra'el | Reigned over Israel in Samaria for 12 years. Death: Killed by Jehu, the next king of Israel |
=== The House of Jehu ===
| 842–815 BCE | 841–814 BCE | 842–815 BCE | 841–814 BCE | Jehu | יהוא בֵּן-נמשי מלך ישראל Yehu ben Yehoshafat, Melekh Yisra'el | Reigned over Israel in Samaria for 28 years. Death: Natural Causes |
| 815–801 BCE | 814–798 BCE | 819–804 BCE | 814–806 BCE | Jehoahaz | יהואחז בֵּן-יהוא מלך ישראל Yeho'achaz ben Yehu, Melekh Yisra'el | Reigned over Israel in Samaria for 17 years. Death: Natural Causes |
| 801–786 BCE | 798–782 BCE | 805–790 BCE | 806–791 BCE | Jehoash (Joash) | יואש בֵּן-יואחז מלך ישראל Yo'ash ben Yeho'achaz, Melekh Yisra'el | Reigned over Israel in Samaria for 16 years. Death: Natural Causes |
| 786–746 BCE | 782–753 BCE | 790–750 BCE | 791–750 BCE | Jeroboam II | ירבעם בֵּן-יואש מלך ישראל Yarob'am ben Yo'ash, Melekh Yisra'el | Reigned over Israel in Samaria for 41 years. Death: Natural Causes. The Book of Jonah or Jonah's journey to Nineveh (when a whale or fish swallowed him) happened at that time. |
| 746 BCE | 753 BCE | 750–749 BCE | 750 BCE | Zachariah | זכריה בֵּן-ירבעם מלך ישראל Zekharya ben Yarob'am, Melekh Yisra'el | Reigned over Israel in Samaria for 6 months. Death: Shallum, son of Jabesh, killed him in front of the people and succeeded as king. |
=== The House of Shallum ===
| 745 BCE | 752 BCE | 749 BCE | 749 BCE | Shallum | שלם בֵּן-יבש מלך ישראל Shallum ben Yavesh, Melekh Yisra'el | Reigned over Israel in Samaria for 1 month. Death: Menahem son of Gadi attacked Shallum and assassinated him. |
=== The House of Menahem (also known as the House of Gadi) ===
| 745–738 BCE | 752–742 BCE | 749–738 BCE | 749–739 BCE | Menahem | מְנַחֵם בֵּן-גדי מלך ישראל Menachem ben Gadi, Melekh Yisra'el | Reigned over Israel in Samaria for 10 years. Death: Natural Causes |
| 738–737 BCE | 742–740 BCE | 738–736 BCE | 739–737 BCE | Pekahiah | פקחיה בֵּן-מְנַחֵם מלך ישראל Peqachya ben Menachem, Melekh Yisra'el | Reigned over Israel in Samaria for 2 years. Death: Pekah, son of Remaliah, one of the chief officers, took 50 men with him and assassinated the king in his palace at Samaria. |
=== The House of Pekah ===
| 737–732 BCE | 740–732 BCE | 736–732 BCE | 737–732 BCE | Pekah | פקח בֵּן-רמליהו מלך ישראל Peqach ben Remalyahu, Melekh Yisra'el | Reigned over Israel in Samaria for 20 years. Death: Hoshea, son of Elah, conspired against him and assassinated him. |
=== The House of Hoshea ===
| 732–722 BCE | 732–722 BCE | 732–722 BCE | 732–722 BCE | Hoshea | הושע בֵּן-אלה מלך ישראל Hoshea' ben 'Ela, Melekh Yisra'el | Reigned over Israel in Samaria for 9 years. Death: King Shalmaneser attacked and captured Samaria. He charged Hoshea with treason, and he put him in prison, then he deported the Israelites to Assyria. |

== Kingdom of Judah ==
| Albright | Thiele | Galil | Kitchen | Common/Biblical name | Regnal Name and style | Notes |
|---|---|---|---|---|---|---|
=== House of David ===
| 915–913 | 913–911 | 914–911 | 915–912 | Abijah | אבים בן-רחבעם מלך יהודה 'Aviyam ben Rechav'am, Melekh Yehuda | Reigned for 3 years. Death: natural causes. |
| 913–873 | 911–870 | 911–870 | 912–871 | Asa | אסא בן-אבים מלך יהודה 'Asa ben 'Aviyam, Melekh Yehuda | Reigned for 41 years. Death: severe foot disease. |
| 873–849 | 870–848 | 870–845 | 871–849 | Jehoshaphat | יהושפט בן-אסא מלך יהודה Yehoshafat ben 'Asa, Melekh Yehuda | Reigned for 25 years. Death: natural causes. |
| 849–842 | 848–841 | 851–843 | 849–842 | Jehoram | יהורם בן-יהושפט מלך יהודה Yehoram ben Yehoshafat, Melekh Yehuda | Reigned for 8 years. Death: severe stomach disease. |
| 842–842 | 841–841 | 843–842 | 842–841 | Ahaziah | אחזיהו בן-יהורם מלך יהודה 'Achazyahu ben Yehoram, Melekh Yehuda | Reigned for 1 year. Death: killed by Jehu, who usurped the throne of Israel. |
=== House of Omri ===
| 842–837 | 841–835 | 842–835 | 841–835 | Athaliah (Queen) | עתליה בת-עמרי מלכת יהודה 'Atalya bat 'Omri, Malkat Yehuda | Reigned for 6 years. Death: killed by the troops assigned by Jehoiada the Priest to protect Joash. Queen Mother, widow of Jehoram and mother of Ahaziah. |
=== House of David ===
| 837–800 | 835–796 | 835–802 | 835–796 | Jehoash (Joash) | יהואש בן-אחזיהו מלך יהודה Yeho'ash ben 'Achazyahu, Melekh Yehuda | Reigned for 40 years. Death: killed by his officials, namely Zabad, son of Shimeath, an Ammonite woman, and Jehozabad, son of Shimrith, a Moabite woman. |
| 800–783 | 796–767 | 805–776 | 796–776 | Amaziah | אמציה בן-יהואש מלך יהודה 'Amatzyah ben Yehoash, Melekh Yehuda | Reigned for 29 years. Death: killed in Lachish by the men sent by his officials who conspired against him. |
| 783–742 | 767–740 | 788–736 | 776–736 | Uzziah | עזיהו בן-אמציה מלך יהודה 'Uzziyahu ben 'Amatzyah, Melekh Yehuda | Reigned for 52 years. Death: Tzaraath. George Syncellus wrote that the First Olympiad took place in Uzziah's 48th regnal year. |
| 742–735 | 740–732 | 758–742 | 750–735/30 | Jotham | יותם בן-עזיהו מלך יהו Yotam ben 'Uzziyahu, Melekh Yehuda | Reigned for 16 years. Death: natural causes. |
| 735–715 | 732–716 | 742–726 | 735/31–715 | Ahaz | אחז בן-יותם מלך יהודה 'Achaz ben Yotam, Melekh Yehuda | Reigned for 16 years. Death: natural causes. The Assyrian king Tiglath-Pileser III records he received tribute from Ahaz; compare 2 Kings 16:7-9. |
| 715–687 | 716–687 | 726–697 | 715–687 | Hezekiah | חזקיהו בן-אחז מלך יהודה Chizeqiyahu ben 'Achaz, Melekh Yehuda | Reigned for 29 years. Death: Natural Causes. Contemporary with Sennacherib of Assyria and Merodach-Baladan of Babylon. |
| 687–642 | 687–643 | 697–642 | 687–642 | Manasseh | מנשה בן-חזקיהו מלך יהודה Menashe ben Chizeqiyahu, Melekh Yehuda | Reigned for 55 years. Death: natural causes. Mentioned in Assyrian records as a contemporary of Esarhaddon. |
| 642–640 | 643–641 | 642–640 | 642–640 | Amon | אמון בן-מנשה מלך יהודה 'Amon ben Menashe, Melekh Yehuda | Reigned for 2 years. Death: killed by his officials, who were killed later on by the people of Judah. |
| 640–609 | 641–609 | 640–609 | 640–609 | Josiah | יאשיהו בן-אמון מלך יהודה Yo'shiyahu ben 'Amon, Melekh Yehuda | Reigned for 31 years. Death: shot by archers during the battle against Neco of Egypt. He died upon his arrival in Jerusalem. |
| 609 | 609 | 609 | 609 | Jehoahaz | יהואחז בן-יאשיהו מלך יהודה Yeho'achaz ben Yo'shiyahu, Melekh Yehuda | Reigned for 3 months. Death: Necho II, king of Egypt, dethroned him, and got him replaced by his brother, Eliakim. Carried off to Egypt, where he died. |
| 609–598 | 609–598 | 609–598 | 609–598 | Jehoiakim | יהויקים בן-יאשיהו מלך יהודה Yehoyaqim ben Yo'shiyahu, Melekh Yehuda | Reigned for 11 years. Death: Natural Causes. The Battle of Carchemish occurred in the fourth year of his reign (Jeremiah 46:2). |
| 598 | 598 | 598–597 | 598–597 | Jehoiachin/Jeconiah | יהויכין בן-יהויקים מלך יהודה Yehoyakhin ben Yehoyaqim, Melekh Yehuda יכניהו בן-יהויקים מלך יהודה Yekhonyahu ben Yehoyaqim, Melekh Yehuda | Reigned for 3 months & 10 days. Death: King Nebuchadnezzar II of Babylon sent for him and brought him to Babylon, where he lived and died. The Babylonians captured Jerusalem, and Jehoiachin deposed on 16 March, 597 BCE. Called Jeconiah in Jeremiah and Esther. |
| 597–587 | 597–586 | 597–586 | 597–586 | Zedekiah | צדקיהו בן-יאשיהו מלך יהודה Tzideqiyahu ben Yo'shiyahu, Melekh Yehuda | Reigned for 11 years. Death: In prison. His reign saw the second rebellion against Nebuchadnezzar (588–586 BCE). Jerusalem was captured after a lengthy siege, the temple was burnt, Zedekiah was blinded and taken into exile, and Judah was reduced to a province. |

== Hasmonean Dynasty ==
| Dates | Common name | Name and style | Notes |
|---|---|---|---|
=== Hasmonean Dynasty ===
| 104–103 BCE | Yehudah | Aristobulus I King and High Priest of Judaea | The first leader from the Hasmonean lineage to call himself king, and also the first of any Judean king to claim both the high priesthood and kingship title. |
| 103–76 BCE | Yonatan Yannai | Alexander Jannaeus King and High Priest of Judaea | |
| 76–67 BCE | Shelomzion | Salome Alexandra Queen of Judaea | |
| 67–63 BCE | Aristobulus | Aristobulus II King and High Priest of Judaea | |
| 63–40 BCE | Yohanan Hurqanos | Hyrcanus II King and High Priest of Judaea; Ethnarch of Judaea | King from 67 BCE, High Priest from 76 BCE |
| 40–37 BCE | Matityahu | Antigonus II Mattathias King and High Priest of Judaea | |

== Herodian Dynasty ==
- Herod the Great (r. 37–4 BCE)
- Herod Agrippa (r. 41–44 CE)

=== Family Tree ===
Family tree (Hasmonean-Herodian)

Phinehas
(H)asmon/Hasmonaeus
Shimon ben Asmon
Yochanan ben Shimon
Mattathias ben Yochanan
John Gaddi | Simon Thassi; Prince of Judaea r. 141–135 BCE | Judas; Maccabeus | Eleazar; Avaran | Jonathan Apphus
John; Hyrcanus I Prince of Judaea r. 134–104 BCE
Aristobulus I King of Judaea r. 104–103 BCE | Alexander; Jannaeus; King of Judaea r. 103–76 BCE | Salome; Alexandra; Queen of Judaea r. 76–67 BCE | Absalom ben Yochanan
John; Hyrcanus II; King of Judaea r. 67–66 BCE | Aristobulus II; King of Judaea r. 66–63 BCE | Salome bat Absalom
Alexandra II bat Hyrcanus II | Alexander II | Antigonus II; Mattathias; King of Judaea r. 40–37 BCE
Malthace | Cleopatra of Jerulasem | Herod the Great; King of Judaea r. 37–4 BCE | Mariamne I
Herod; Antipas; Tetrarch of Galilee r. 4 BCE – 39 CE | Herod; Archelaus; Ethnarch of Judaea r. 4 BCE - 6 CE | Philip the Tetrarch; Tetrarch of Batanea r. 4 BCE – 34 CE | Aristobulus IV
Herod V King of Chalcis r. 41–48 CE | Herod Agrippa; King of Batanaea r. 37–41 CE; King of Judea r. 41–44 CE
Aristobulus; Tetrarch of Chalcis r. 57–92 CE | Herod; Agrippa II; King of Batanaea r. 53–100 CE

== See also ==
- History of ancient Israel and Judah
- Jesus, King of the Jews
- List of Jewish leaders in the Land of Israel
- Lists of ancient kings
