= Hoshea =

19th and last King of Northern Israel

Hoshea הוֹשֵׁעַ
- King Of Israel
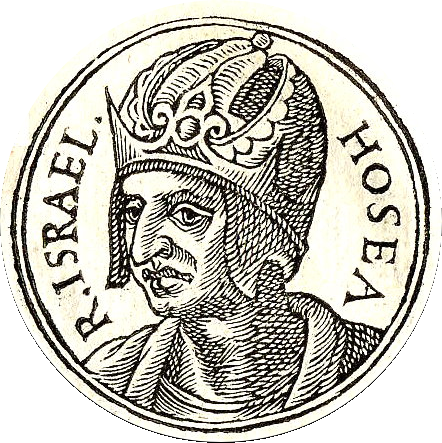
- Hoshea from "Guillaume Rouillé's Promptuarii Iconum Insigniorum

King of Israel (Northern Kingdom)
- Reign: c. 732–c. 722 BCE
- Predecessor: Pekah
- Successor: Annexed by Assyria
- Born: c. 759 BCE
- Died: after 722 BCE
- Father: Elah

Hoshea (Biblical Hebrew: הוֹשֵׁעַ, romanized: Hōšēaʿ, lit. 'salvation'; Akkadian: 𒀀𒌑𒋛𒀪 A'úsiʾ [a-ú-si-ʾ]; Latin: Osee) was the nineteenth and last king of the northern Kingdom of Israel (or a puppet king) and son of Elah (not the Israelite king Elah). William F. Albright dated his reign to 732–721 BCE, while Edwin R. Thiele offered the dates 732–723 BCE.

Hoshea, a trusted advisor and companion to King Pekah of Israel, seized power during a time of great turmoil. As the Assyrian Empire invaded Israel's eastern territories, Pekah's grip on the throne began to slip. Sensing an opportunity, Hoshea conspired against his master. In the 20th year of Pekah's reign, Hoshea struck, assassinating the king during a battle against the Assyrians and the children of the east. The Assyrian king, Tiglath-Pileser III, took advantage of Israel's weakened state and installed Hoshea as the new king. However, Hoshea's reign was short-lived, and he soon found himself at the mercy of the Assyrians.

Despite paying tribute to the Assyrian Empire, Hoshea eventually stopped making payments, hoping to assert his independence. This decision proved disastrous. The Assyrian king, Shalmaneser V, laid siege to Samaria, the capital of Israel, and after a three-year siege, the city fell in 722 BCE. The Assyrians then deported many of the Israelites to other parts of their empire, marking the end of the Kingdom of Israel. Hoshea's rebellion had ultimately led to the downfall of his kingdom.

== Reign ==
=== Accession ===
Assyrian records confirm the biblical account of how he became king. Under Ahaz, Judah had rendered allegiance to Tiglath-Pileser III of Assyria, when the Northern Kingdom under Pekah, in league with Rezin of Aram-Damascus, had attempted to coerce the Judean king into joint action against Assyria. Hoshea, a captain in Pekah's own army, placed himself at the head of the Assyrian party in Samaria; he then removed Pekah by assassination; Tiglath-pileser rewarded Hoshea by making him king over the Tribe of Ephraim (a name used here for the entire northern kingdom), which had been reduced to smaller dimensions. An undated inscription of Tiglath-Pileser III boasts of making Hoshea king after his predecessor had been overthrown:

Israel (lit.: "Omri-house" Bit-Humria) ... overthrew their king Pekah (Pa-qa-ha) and I placed Hoshea (A-ú -si') as king over them. I received from them 10 talents of gold, 1,000(?) talents of silver as their [tri]bute and brought them to Assyria.

The amount of tribute exacted from Hoshea is not stated in the text, but Menahem, about ten years previously (743 or 742 BCE), was required to pay 1,000 talents of silver to Tiglath-Pileser in order to "strengthen his hold on the kingdom" (2 Kings 15:19), apparently against Menahem's rival Pekah.

So long as Tiglath-pileser was on the throne, Hoshea remained loyal; but when Shalmaneser V succeeded, Hoshea made an effort to regain his independence and entered into negotiations with So, King of Egypt. Probably misled by Egypt's favorable promises, Hoshea discontinued paying tribute. Winckler contends that in this anti-Assyrian movement, in which Tyre also had a share, a last effort was made on the part of the Arabic commercial states to shut out Assyria from the Arabo-Indian commerce, for which possession of the Mediterranean ports was of vital importance.

Shalmaneser soon interpreted this as a sign of rebellion and directed his armies against Samaria. The Assyrian Eponym Canon shows that Shalmaneser campaigned "against" (somewhere, name missing) in the years 727, 726, and 725 BCE, and it is presumed that the missing name was Samaria. The Babylonian Chronicle states that Shalmaneser ravaged the city of Sha-ma-ra-in (Samaria). Additional evidence that it was Shalmaneser, not Sargon II who initially captured Samaria, despite the latter's claim, late in his reign, that he was its conqueror, was presented by Tadmor, who showed that Sargon had no campaigns in the west in his first two years of reign (722 and 721 BCE). Therefore, 722 is the last possible date for the fall of Samaria, after a siege of 3 years, the Bible gives (2 Kings 17:5), and 724 is the earliest date.

=== End of reign ===
It is likely that Hoshea, disappointed by the lack of Egyptian support, endeavored to avert the calamity by resuming the payment of tribute, but, distrusted, he was forced to fight and was taken prisoner in battle. Although deprived of its ruler, the capital mounted an effective defense. However, the Assyrians captured Samaria after a siege of three years. Shalmaneser V died shortly after the city fell, and the Assyrian army was recalled to assure the succession of Sargon II. The land of Israel—which had resisted the Assyrians for years without a king—again revolted. Sargon II returned with the Assyrian army in 720 BCE and conquered the kingdom, deporting its citizens beyond the Euphrates (some 27,290 according to the inscription of Sargon II), and settling people from Babylon, Kutha, Avva, Hama and Sepharvaim in their place (2 Kings 17:6, 24). According to the Books of Kings, this destruction occurred "because the children of Israel sinned against the Lord" (2 Kings 17:7–24). What happened to Hoshea following the end of the Kingdom of Israel, and when or where he died after his capture by Sargon II, is unknown. The Rabbis explain the description of Hoshea "And he did what was evil in the eyes of the Lord, though not like the kings of Israel who had preceded him." because he had removed the blockade which had stood for hundreds of years on the road to Jerusalem, finally giving the Israelites the choice of either serving God in the Holy Temple or continuing to practice idolatry; Nevertheless, although the sentries were removed, the Jews continued in their idolatrous ways and did not go up to the Holy Temple in Jerusalem; this happened three years before Samaria fell.

== Seal of Hoshea's servant ==
In the mid-1990s, an unprovenanced bulla appeared on the antiquities market. The seal has been dated by André Lemaire to the second half of the 8th century BCE on paleographic grounds, and its inscription reads "Belonging to Abdi, servant of Hoshea". If authentic, it is perhaps the only archaeological attestation of Hoshea in an Israelite inscription found to date.

== See also ==
- List of biblical figures identified in extra-biblical sources
- So, possibly Osorkon IV
