= Pekahiah =

Pekaias פְּקַחְיָה
- King Of Israel
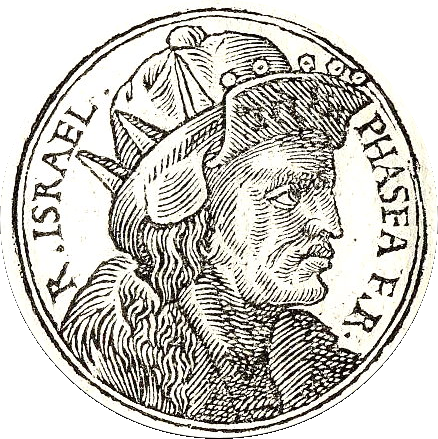
- Pekahiah from Guillaume Rouillé's Promptuarii Iconum Insigniorum

King of Israel (Northern Kingdom)
- Reign: c. 742 – c. 740 BC
- Predecessor: Menahem
- Successor: Pekah
- Father: Menahem

Pekahiah (/ˌpɛkəˈhaɪə/; Hebrew: פְּקַחְיָה Pəqaḥyā; "YHWH has opened the eyes"; Latin: Phaceia) was the seventeenth and third-from-last king of Israel and the son of Menahem, whom he succeeded, and the second and last king of Israel from the House of Gadi. He ruled from the capital of Samaria.

Pekahiah became king in the fiftieth year of the reign of Uzziah, king of Judah. William F. Albright has dated his reign to 738–736 BC, while E. R. Thiele offers the dates 742–740 BC.

Pekahiah is stated to have done evil in the eyes of Yahweh. He continued the practices of Jeroboam, the son of Nebat, which are called the sins of Jeroboam. In other words, he worshiped at the golden calves which Jeroboam had built at Bethel and at Dan, and continued to promote the corrupted priesthood which Jeroboam had founded.

After a reign of two years, Pekahiah was assassinated in the royal citadel at Samaria by Pekah ben Remaliah, one of his own chief military officers – with the help of fifty men from Gilead. Pekah succeeded Pekahiah as king.

Pekahiah House of Gadi; Contemporary King of Judah: Uzziah, Jotham
Regnal titles
Preceded by Menahem	King of Israel; 742–740 BC	Succeeded by Pekah
