= Tibni =

Tibni תִּבְנִי
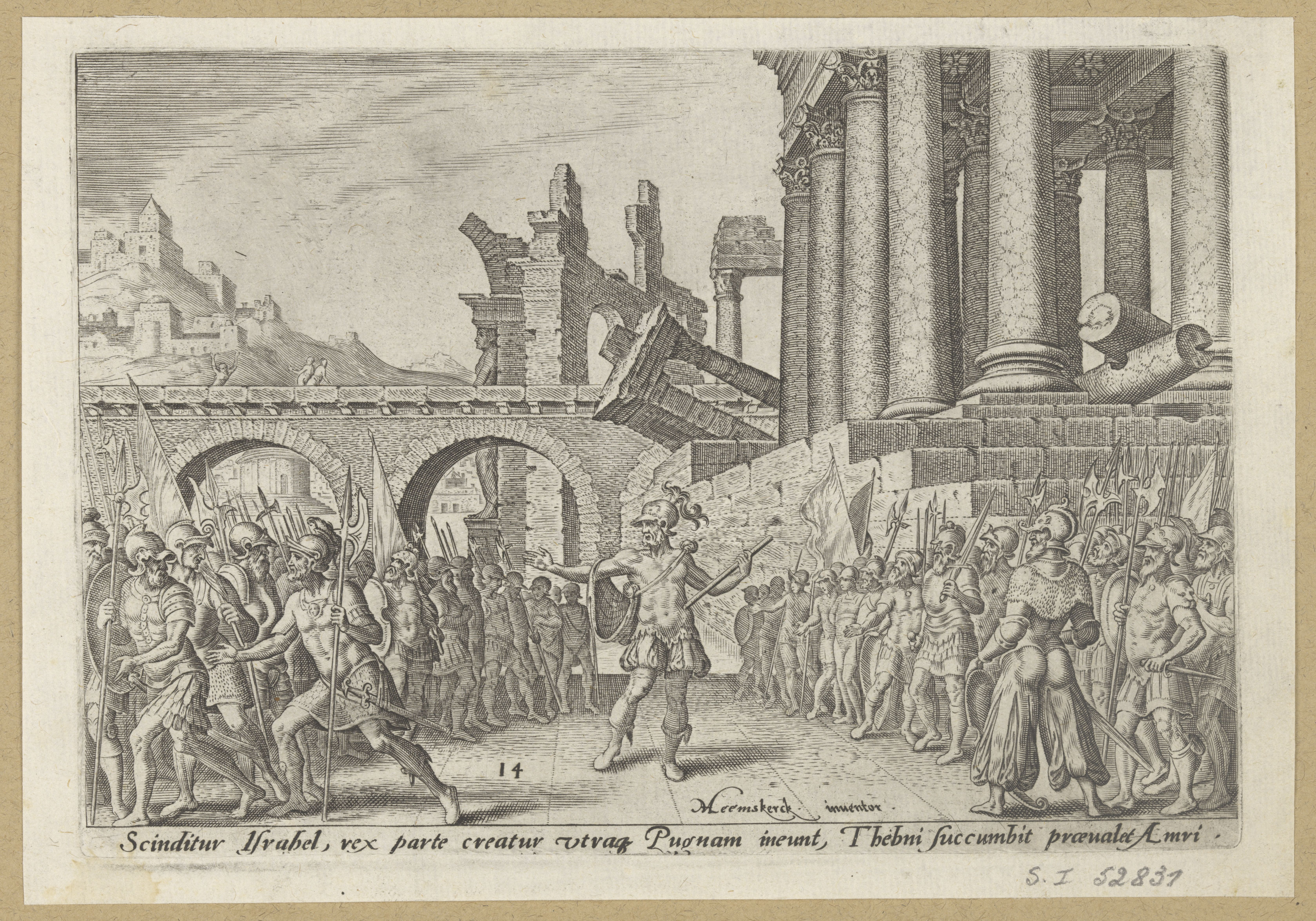
- Israel is divided between Tibni and Omri print by Maarten van Heemskerck

King of Israel (Northern Kingdom)
- Reign: 885/76–880/71 BCE
- Predecessor: Zimri
- Successor: Omri
- Father: Ginath

Tibni (Hebrew: תִּבְנִי Tīḇnī) was a claimant to the throne of Israel and the son of Ginath. Albright has dated his reign to 876–871 BC, while Thiele offers the dates 885–880 BC.

== Ancestry ==
Tomoo Ishida instead suggested that the narrative of dynastic instability in the Kingdom of Israel suggests an underlying rivalry between tribes for its throne. In the biblical narrative, the House of Jeroboam was from the Tribe of Ephraim, while the House of Baasha was from the Tribe of Issachar. The Omrides are connected in this narrative with the city of Jezreel, where they maintained a second palace. According to the Book of Joshua, Jezreel was controlled by the Tribe of Issachar. Ishida views the narrative as suggesting that the Omrides themselves were members of the Tribe of Issachar. The assassinated king Elah and Omri thus shared a "common tribal origin", and were possibly kinsmen. Omri and the Tribe of Issachar's opposition to Zimri indicates that Zimri was not a member of their tribe.

Ishida views both Zimri and his successor Tibni as likely members of the Tribe of Ephraim, its candidates in an attempt to reclaim the throne. But he also suggests another hypothesis, that Tibni originated from the city of Gina (also known as Beth-haggan) mentioned in the Amarna letters (14th century BC). In the Biblical narrative, this city was under the control of the Tribe of Manasseh. So Tibni could instead be the Tribe of Manasseh's candidate for the throne.

Similarly, genealogist David Hughes speculated that Zimri and Tibni were members of the Tribe of Ephraim, and siblings to each other. He further speculated that they were descendants of Hoshea, son of Azaziah, one of the rulers of the Tribe of Ephraim. Hoshea and Azaziah are characters briefly mentioned in the Books of Chronicles (I Chronicles 27:20), where Hoshea is a contemporary of David:

...of the children of Ephraim, Hoshea the son of Azaziah

== In the Bible ==
After Zimri had ended his life after a reign of seven days, the people of Israel were divided into two factions, one siding with Omri, and the other with Tibni. They and their forces fought each other for several years until Omri's forces prevailed and Tibni's death. It appears that Tibni was regent over half the kingdom of Israel for a period of four years. Tibni had a brother named Joram, who seconded him in the dispute over the throne and who died at the same time as himself, probably at the hands of Omri's party; however he is only mentioned in the LXX version of 1 Kings 16:22. Tibni's death is recorded but not explained.

== Name ==
It was suggested that Tibni is a nickname meaning "man of straw".

== See also ==
- List of Israelite civil conflicts

Tibni Contemporary King of Judah: Asa
Regnal titles
Preceded by Zimri	King of Samarian Israel; 882 BCE	Succeeded by Omri
