= Iran Stele =

Ancient Stele from the Assyrian Empire

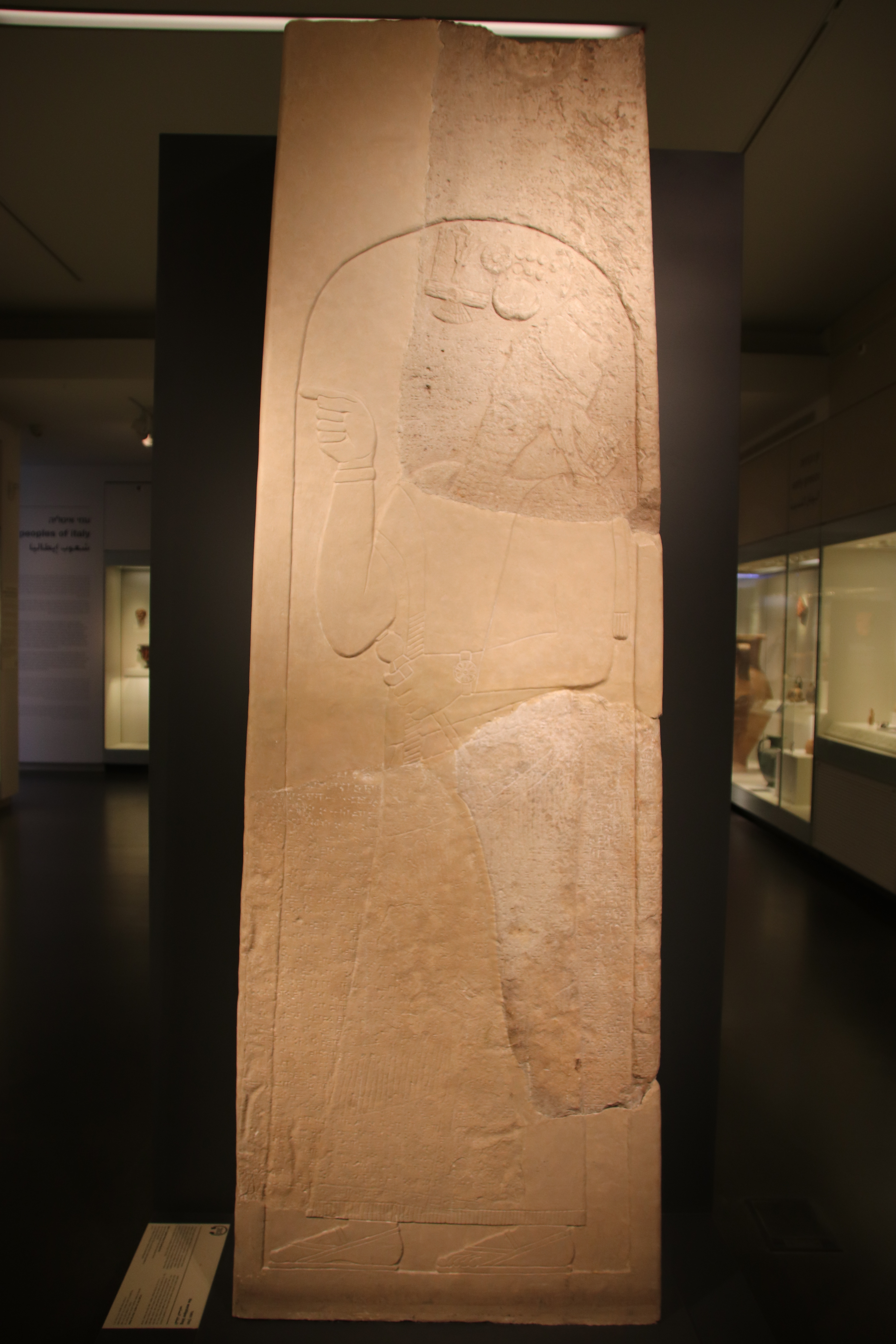
- The Iran Stele on display at the Israel Museum, 2018
- Material: Dolomite (rock)
- Height: 240 cm (94 in)
- Writing: Akkadian
- Created: c. 737 BCE
- Period/culture: Reign of Tiglath-Pileser III of the Neo-Assyrian Empire
- Discovered: Zagros Mountains, Iran
- Present location: Jerusalem, Israel
- Period: Iron Age

The Iran Stele is a stele from the Neo-Assyrian Empire. Dated to around 737 BCE, it is written in Akkadian and was discovered in the Zagros Mountains of Iran, hence the name.

The Assyrian king Tiglath-Pileser III was instrumental in expanding the Neo-Assyrian Empire westward, reaching the Levant and encountering Israel and Judah. The Iran Stele was discovered in three large fragments and details his military campaigns during the first nine years of his reign.

Of particular interest to ancient Israel is a section of the inscription listing the kings who paid tribute to him, including Menahem of Samaria. Two of the Iran Stele fragments are now housed at the Israel Museum in Jerusalem after being part of various private collections.

Text:

“Menahem of Samaria, Hiram of Tyre, . . . gold, silver . . .”

“. . the place of Samaria only did I leave their king”
