= Pekah =

18th and penultimate king of Israel

Pekah פֶּקַח
- King Of Israel
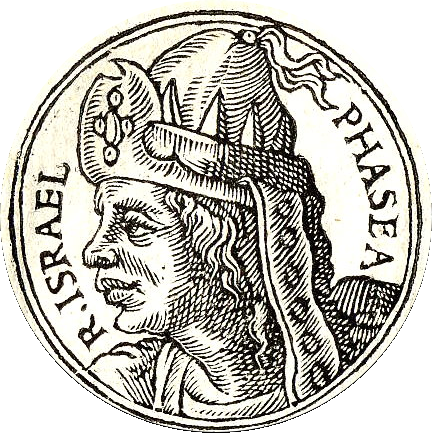
- Portrait from Promptuarium Iconum Insigniorum (1553) by Guillaume Rouillé

King of Israel (Northern Kingdom)
- Reign: c. 740 – c. 732 BC
- Predecessor: Pekahiah
- Successor: Hoshea
- Died: c. 732 BC
- Father: Remaliah

Pekah (/ˈpɛkɑː, ˈpiː-/, Hebrew: פֶּקַח Peqaḥ; Akkadian: 𒉺𒅗𒄩 Paqaḫa [pa-qa-ḫa]; Latin: Phacee) was the eighteenth and penultimate king of Israel. He was a captain in the army of king Pekahiah of Israel, whom he killed to become king. Pekah was the son of Remaliah. (Note: (/ˌrɛməˈlaɪə/; Latin: Romelia))

Pekah became king in the fifty-second and last year of Uzziah, king of Judah.

William F. Albright has dated his reign to 737–732 BC, while E. R. Thiele, following H. J. Cook and Carl Lederer, held that Pekah set up in Gilead a rival reign to Menahem's Samaria-based kingdom in Nisan of 752 BC, becoming sole ruler on his assassination of Menahem's son Pekahiah in 740/739 BC and dying in 732/731 BC. This explanation is consistent with evidence of the Assyrian chronicles, which agree with Menahem being king in 743 BC or 742 BC and Hoshea being king from 732 BC.

When Pekah allied with Rezin, king of Aram, to attack Ahaz, the king of Judah, Ahaz appealed to Tiglath-Pileser III, the king of Assyria, for help. While the Assyrian king obliged, Judah would become a tributary of Assyria.

== Reign ==
With the aid of a band of Gileadites, from whose home territory he probably originally came, he slew Pekahiah and assumed the throne.

In c. 732 BC, Pekah allied with Rezin, king of Aram, and threatened Jerusalem. The prime reason for such a league was probably to protect their respective countries from another incursion of Tiglath-pileser III, who had compelled Menahem, in 738 BC, to pay a large tribute. The two kings united their armies and attempted to coerce Ahaz of Judah into joining them. Pekah raided Judah and carried to Samaria a number of captives, but, rebuked by the prophet Oded and by some of the prominent men, the Israelite soldiers released them and sent them back. The united forces of Israel and Syria appeared before the walls of Jerusalem to demand its surrender. At this juncture Isaiah the prophet came to the support of Judah and her king. The allies had proposed to set upon the throne of Judah a son of Tabeel, probably one favorable to the alliance. Ahaz, however, knowing that Tiglath-pileser was within call, appealed to him for help. Ahaz's "dread" of Rezin and Pekah, "Son of Remaliah" is recorded in the Immanuel prophecy in Isaiah 7:14 where the birth of a son (possibly Hezekiah) whence the defeat of both kings by the King of Assyria will occur before the child is old enough to eat curds and honey and distinguish right from wrong. After Ahaz paid tribute to Tiglath-Pileser, the Assyrians sacked Damascus and annexed Aram. According to 2 Kings 16:9, the population of Aram was deported and Rezin executed. According to 2 Kings 15:29, Tiglath-Pileser also attacked Israel and "took Ijon, Abel Beth Maacah, Janoah, Kedesh and Hazor. He took Gilead and Galilee, including all the land of Naphtali, and deported the people to Assyria." Tiglath-Pileser also records this act in one of his inscriptions.

Soon afterwards, this Pekah was assassinated by Hoshea ben Elah (that is, Hoshea the son of Elah), a captain from Pekah's own army, who then took the throne. Tiglath-Pileser in an inscription mentions the slaying of Pekah by his fellow Israelites. The inference here is that the people, seeing the inevitable outcome of the contest with Assyria, put out of the way their fighting king, and then yielded submission to the conqueror, Tiglath-pileser III. He is supposed by some to have been the "shepherd" mentioned in Zechariah 11:16.

== Chronology ==
=== Controversy ===
The data given for Pekah's reign in the biblical sources have generated considerable discussion. His ending date can be established fairly firmly as 732/731 BC.

But two conflicting systems of reckoning seem to be used for his reign. One system gives him a long reign of twenty years (2 Kings 15:27), which puts his starting date in 752 BC. This date is consistent with the statement that Jotham began to reign in Pekah's second year, 750 BC (2 Kings 15:32), and that Jotham's successor Ahaz began to reign in his 17th year, 735 BC (2 Kings 16:1).

However, a shorter reign is indicated by 2 Kings 15:27, which says that Pekah began to reign in the 52nd year of Azariah (Uzziah) of Judah, i.e. in 740 BC. Also, Pekah assassinated Pekahiah to assume the throne (2 Kings 15:25), and Pekahiah's two-year reign (2 Kings 15:23) was preceded by his father Menahem's ten-year reign (2 Kings 15:17). Menahem gave tribute to Tiglath-Pileser III, as is recorded in 2 Kings 15:19 (where Pul is equivalent to Tiglath-Pileser) and also in Tiglath-Pileser's inscriptions. Since Tiglath-Pileser came to the throne in 745 BC, Menahem's tribute would have to be in 745 or later, yet the "longer" chronology gave Pekah, successor to Menahem and Pekahiah, a twenty-year reign that started before this, in 752. These apparent inconsistencies led many scholars to reject all or part of the biblical sources concerning Pekah. D. M. Beegle has maintained that it is impossible to reconcile a twenty-year reign for Pekah with other biblical or with Assyrian history, using this as one of his arguments that the doctrine of the inerrancy of all Scripture cannot be true.

=== C. Lederer and H. J. Cook: a rival reign in Gilead ===
In 1887, Carl Lederer proposed that the existence of two apparently contradictory sets of text for Pekah could be explained if there really were two systems in use for reckoning the reign of Pekah, and these were the consequence of a rivalry between Pekah and Menahem. The rivalry began when Menahem slew Shallum, putting an end to Shallum's one-month reign (2 Kings 15:13–14). This assumption accounted for all the chronological texts that related four kings of Judah (Uzziah through Hezekiah) to three kings of Israel (Menahem, Pekahiah, and Pekah), but it apparently was largely ignored by the scholarly community. Then in 1954, H. J. Cook added new considerations to support Lederer's thesis, beyond just the pragmatic. Cook maintained that although the Scriptures did not explicitly state the existence of two rival kingdoms in the north in the latter half of the eighth century BC, their existence could be inferred from passages of the book of Hosea that was written about the time of Pekah and Menahem. Cook showed that although "Ephraim" is sometimes used in Scripture to designate all of the northern kingdom, in various passages of Hosea such as Hosea 5:5, "Israel" and "Ephraim" are not synonymous but refer to separate entities. Cook's thesis in this regard was strengthened when Rodger Young pointed out that the Hebrew of Hosea 5:5 has a vav before Israel and then another vav before Ephraim, which is the Hebrew method of expressing "both... and," implying a distinction in this passage between Israel and Ephraim. All translations which have rendered this in some sense as "Israel, even Ephraim" are therefore incorrect (the Holman Study Bible renders the verse correctly, as did the ancient Septuagint). Others who have accepted the Lederer/Cook explanation of the two methods of dating for the time of Pekah are Thiele in his second edition of Mysterious Numbers and later, Leslie McFall, Francis Andersen and David Noel Freedman in their commentary on Hosea in the Anchor Bible Series, T. C. Mitchell, in the Cambridge Ancient History, and Jack Finegan in his Handbook of Biblical Chronology.

=== Assyrian references ===
Looking at this from the Assyrian side, Stanley Rosenbaum maintains that the records of Tiglath-Pileser III demonstrate that the Assyrian king distinguished between two kingdoms in the north of Israel. Tiglath-Pileser says he united the northern part (restored as Naphthali in the text) with Assyria, whereas for the southern part, he wrote, "Israel (bit-Humria) overthrew their king Pekah and I placed Hoshea as king over them." Cook thinks that Menahem's tribute to Assyria in 2 Kings 15:19 also suggests the existence of a rival to Menahem's kingdom:

When Tiglath-Pileser III appeared in the west, Menahem took the opportunity to enlist his support by sending tribute of a thousand talents of silver, with the idea—as 2 Kings xv 19 puts it—'that he might help him to confirm his hold of the royal power'. This expression may simply indicate Menahem's sense of insecurity in the presence of Assyrian power; but it may equally well indicate the presence of a rival.

Isaiah 7:1,2 speaks of a league between Pekah and King Rezin of Aram that was a threat to Ahaz of Judah. Ahaz and Menahem of Israel (Ephraim) followed a pro-Assyrian policy and were therefore aligned against the coalition of Pekah and the Arameans that sought to withstand Assyria, thus explaining why Menahem felt insecure and sought to buy the support of Assyria.

=== Pekah as commander under Pekahiah ===
A major objection to the idea that Pekah headed a kingdom that was rival to Menahem's reign in Samaria is that he is listed as a commander (shalish) of Pekahaiah, Menahem's son, whom he slew (2 Kings 15:25). Young remarks,

The objections to Pekah being a rival to Menahem usually center on Pekah’s position as an officer in the army of Pekahiah, Menahem’s son and successor (2 Kgs 15:25). But there is nothing inherently unreasonable about two rivals reaching a détente under which one contender accepts a subordinate position, and he then bides his time until the opportunity comes to slay his rival (or his rival’s son) in a coup. Once the rivalry had begun, the external threat (Assyria) provided compelling reasons for a détente.

Any rivalry between Menahem and Pekah could only appear more and more foolish in light of the growing menace of Assyria. In 733, Tiglath-Pileser campaigned against Damascus, the capital of the Arameans, Pekah's erstwhile ally, and he returned to destroy the city in 732. Pekah must have seen the handwriting on the wall in 733 or earlier, and any feeling for Realpolitik would dictate that it was time for the two rivals to put aside their differences under some sort of accommodation. But Realpolitik would also suggest that this accommodation should not include giving your potential rival a position of leadership in the army, which Pekahiah learned too late.

This is based on inference from the political situation of the time. Gleason Archer showed how inference is used to reconstruct a rivalry in the neighboring kingdom of Egypt that has striking parallels to the Pekah/Menahem rivalry. When Thutmose II died, the intended heir was his son Thutmose III, who was still a boy. However, some time not long after the death of her husband (Thutmose II), Hatshepsut assumed the royal regalia and the title of pharaoh, reigning for 21 years. As he grew older, Thutmose III was given the position of commander of the army, similar to Pekah's position as commander, but still under his aunt and stepmother Hatshepsut. After Hatshepsut died, Thutmose, in an inscription describing his first campaign, said it was in his 22nd year of reign, thereby counting his regnal years from the time his father died, not from the death of Hatshepsut. Thutmose left no explanation for modern historians that his 22nd year was really the first year of sole reign, any more than Pekah or the historian of 2 Kings left an explanation that Pekah's 12th year, the year in which he slew Pekahiah, was really his first year of sole reign. Modern historians rely on a comparison of inscriptions and chronological considerations to reconstruct the chronology of Thutmose III, and there is unanimity among Egyptologists that he counted as his own years the 21 years that Hatshepsut was on the throne, even though no inscription has ever been found explicitly stating this fact. Commenting on the fact that Egyptologists have no problem in reconstructing history using inference of this sort, whereas critics will sometimes not allow the same historical method to be applied to the Bible, Young writes, "Do those who reject the Menahem/Pekah rivalry as improbable also reject as improbable this reconstruction from Egypt's Eighteenth Dynasty that Egyptologists use to explain the regnal dates of Thutmose III? How do they explain Hosea 5:5?"

=== Chronological note ===
The calendars for reckoning the years of kings in Judah and Israel were offset by six months, that of Judah starting in Tishri (in the fall) and that of Israel in Nisan (in the spring). Cross-synchronizations between the two kingdoms therefore often allow narrowing of the beginning or ending dates of a king to within a six-month range. A study of the relevant texts in Scripture allows the narrowing of the start of the Pekah/Menahem rivalry on the death of Shallum to the month of Nisan, 752 BC, as Thiele showed in the second edition of Mysterious Numbers, pp. 87–88. In order to simplify things for the reader, Thiele, in the third edition, omitted the logic that allows this accuracy. The third edition also frequently fails to make explicit the six-month narrowing of dates that is possible from the Biblical data, settling instead on a somewhat inexact notation like "931/930 BC" or even simply "931 BC." For Pekah, synchronisms with the kings of Judah show that he assassinated Pekahiah sometime between Tishri 1 of 740 BC and the day before Nisan 1 of 739 BC. He was slain by Hoshea sometime between Tishri 1 of 732 BC and the day before Nisan 1 of 731 BC.

== See also ==
- List of biblical figures identified in extra-biblical sources

Pekah House of Remaliah; Contemporary Kings of Judah: Uzziah, Jotham, Ahaz
Regnal titles
Preceded by Pekahiah	King of Israel; Rivalry with Menahem: Nisan 752 in Gilead; Sole reign: 740–732 BCE in Samaria	Succeeded by Hoshea
