= Ahaz =

12th king of Judah

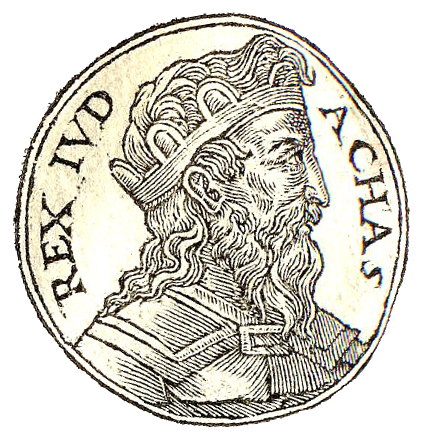
- Portrait from Promptuarium Iconum Insigniorum (1553) by Guillaume Rouillé

King of Judah
- Reign: 732–716 BC
- Predecessor: Jotham
- Successor: Hezekiah
- Spouse: Abijah
- House: House of David
- Father: Jotham

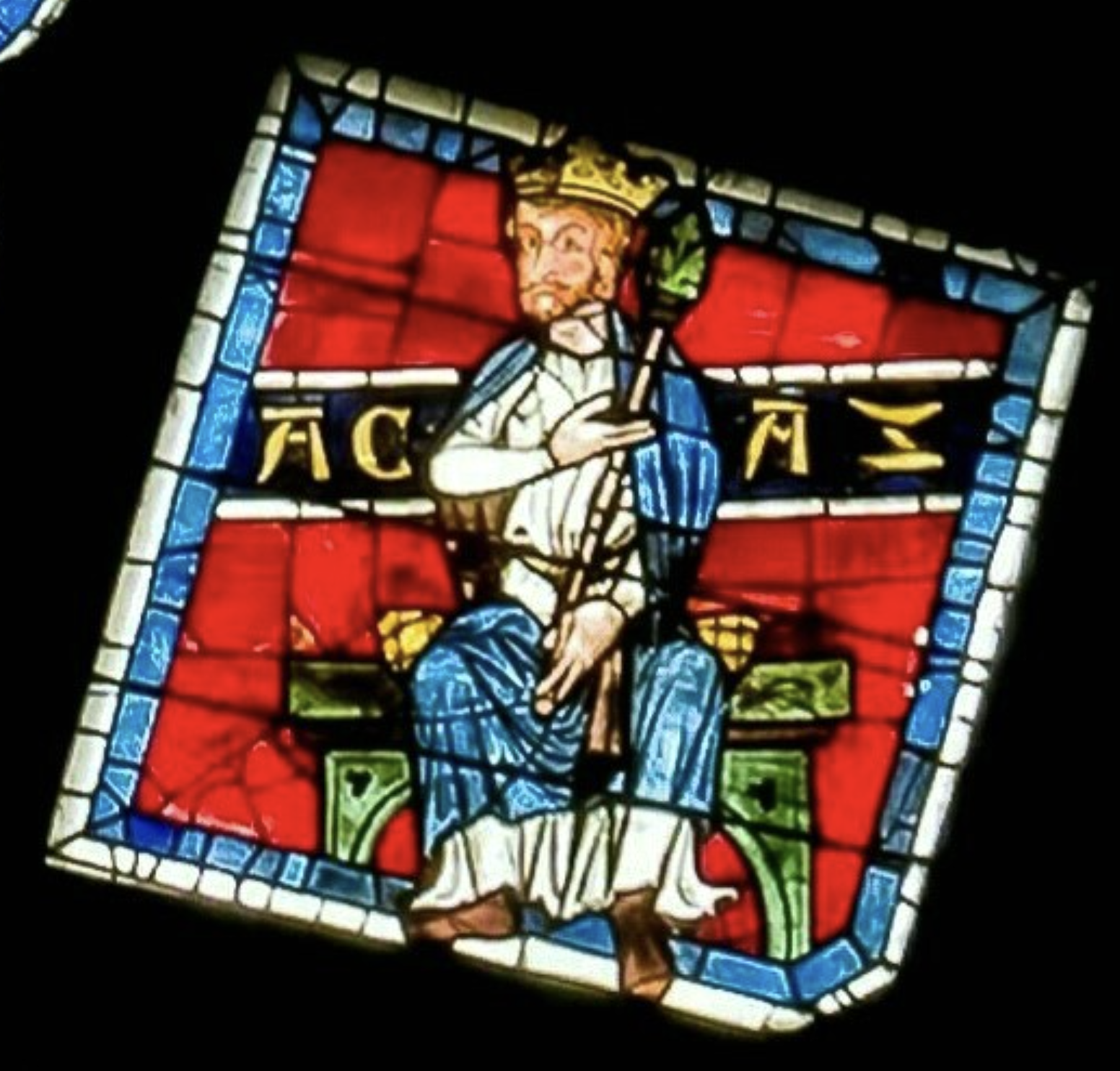
King Ahaz of Judah, from the north rose window of Chartres Cathedral

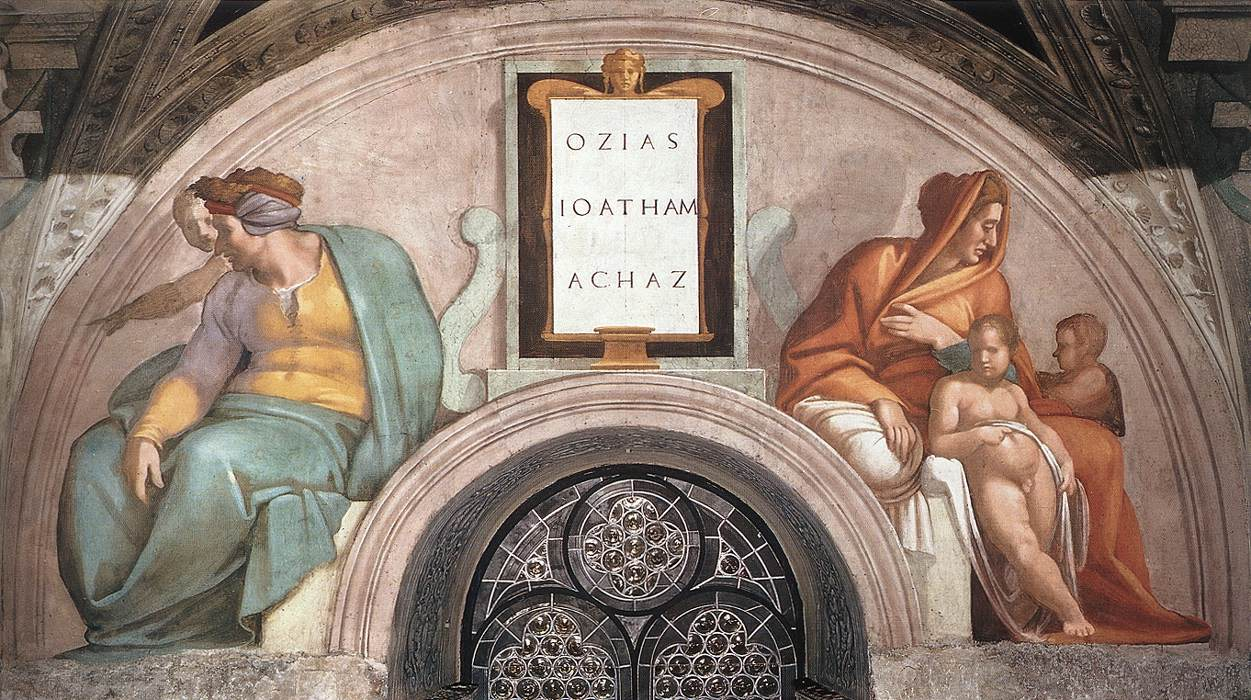
Uzziah, Jotham, and Ahaz, from the Sistine Chapel ceiling

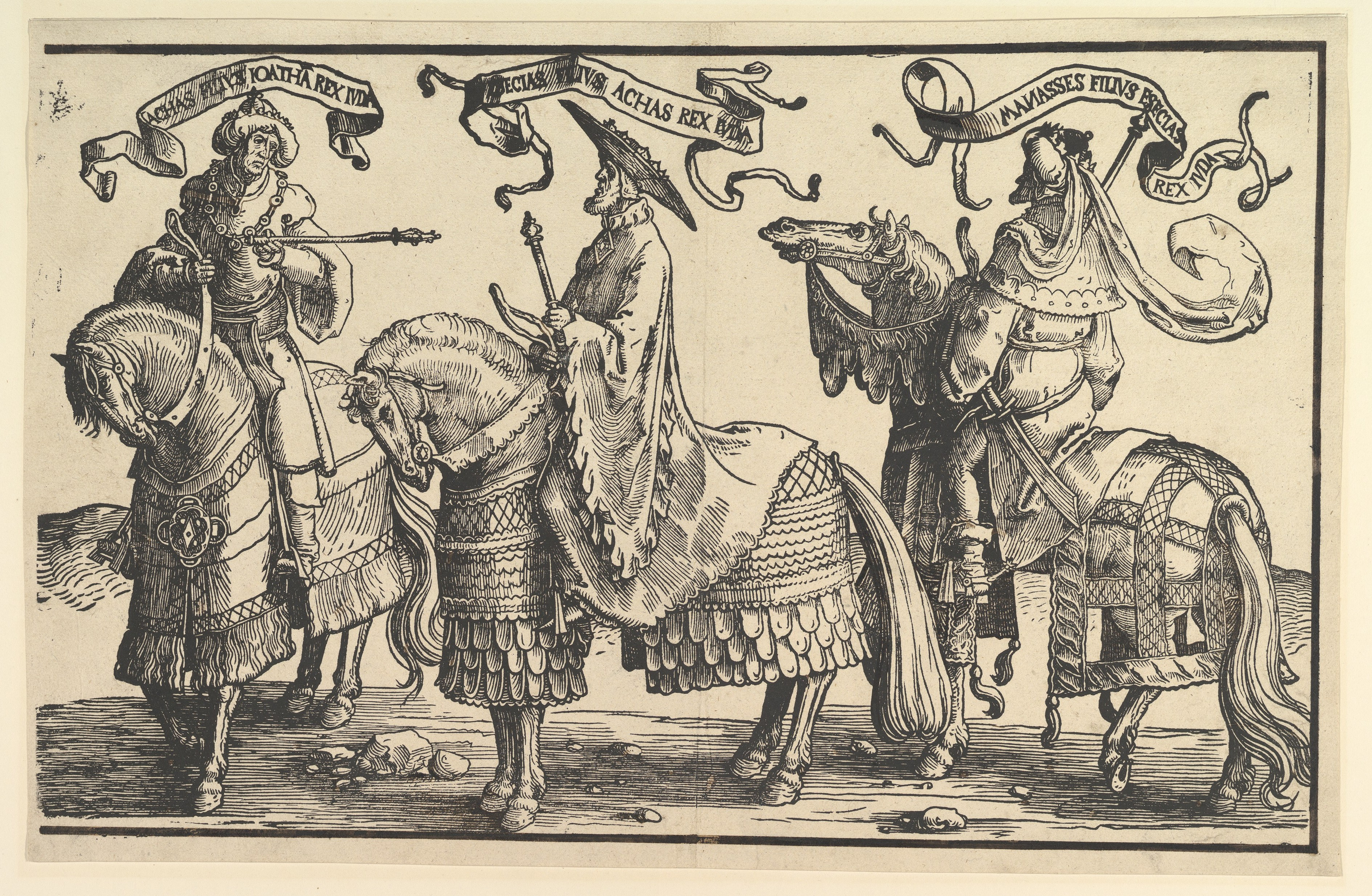
Ahaz, Hezekiah, and Manasseh, by Lucas van Leyden

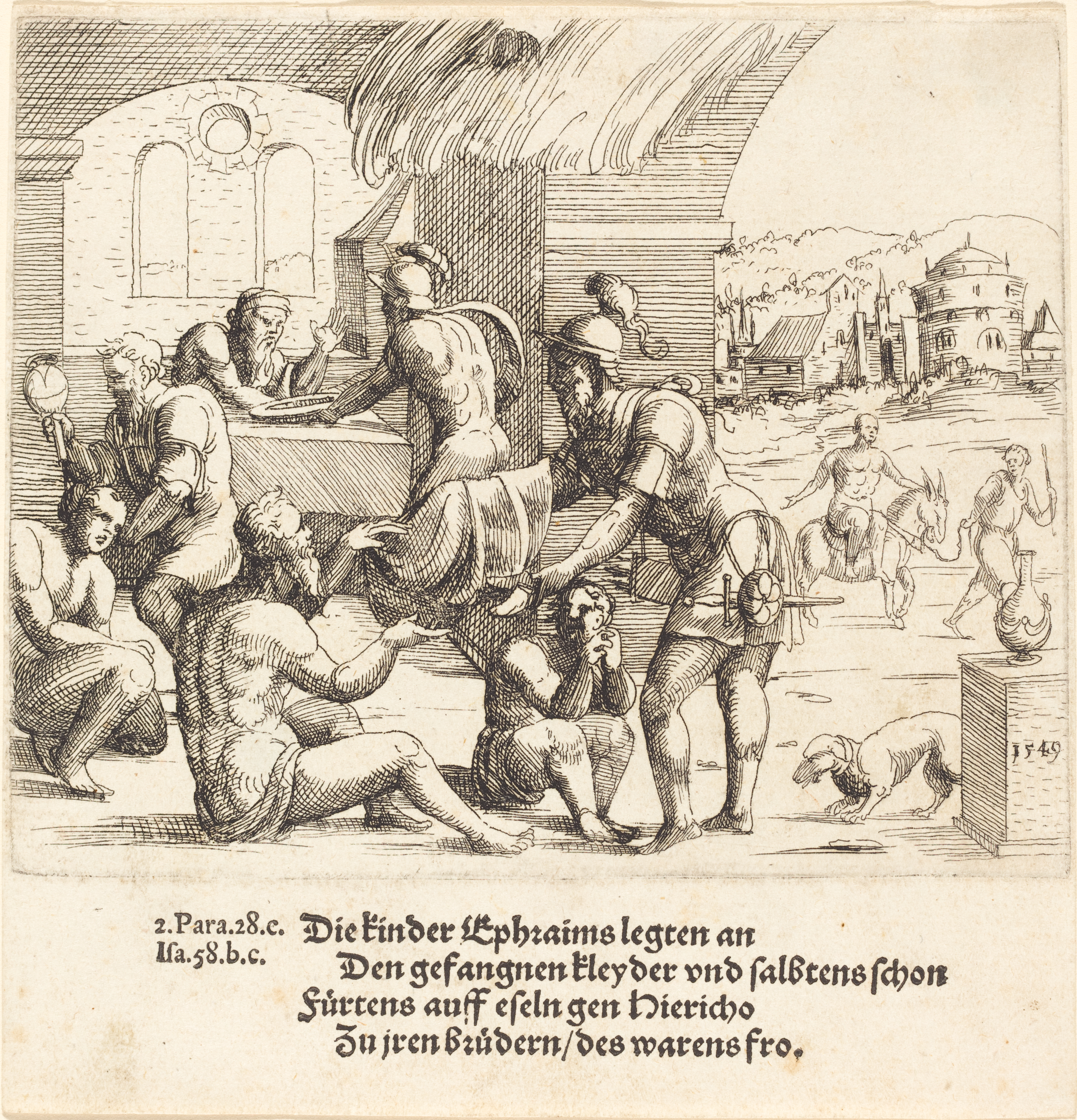
After the prophet Oded rebukes the Israelite army for its mistreatment of the captives from Judah, the men of Ephraim care for the captives and return them to their kinsfolk at Jericho. (2 Chronicles 28:8–15)

Ahaz (Hebrew: אָחָז, romanized: ʼĀḥāz, lit. '"has held"'; Greek: Ἄχαζ, Ἀχάζ Akhaz; Latin: Achaz) an abbreviation of Jehoahaz II (of Judah), "Yahweh has held" (Hebrew: יְהוֹאָחָז, Modern: Yəhō’aḥaz, Tiberian: Yŏhō’āḥāz; Akkadian: 𒅀𒌑𒄩𒍣 Ya'úḫazi [ia-ú-ḫa-zi]) was the twelfth king of Judah, and the son and successor of Jotham. Ahaz was 20 when he became king of Judah and reigned for 16 years.

Ahaz is portrayed as an evil king in the Second Book of Kings (2 Kings 16:2).

In Edwin R. Thiele's opinion, Ahaz was co-regent with Jotham from 736/735 BC, and his sole reign began in 732/731 and ended in 716/715 BC. However, William F. Albright has dated his reign to 744–728 BC.

The Gospel of Matthew lists Ahaz of Judah in the genealogy of Jesus. He is also mentioned in Isaiah 7 and Isaiah 14:28.

== Reign ==
Ahaz's reign commenced at the age of 20, in the 17th year of the reign of Pekah of Israel. It is described in 2 Kings 16; Isaiah 7–9; and 2 Chronicles 28.

=== Destruction of Northern Kingdom ===
Immediately upon his accession, Ahaz had to meet a coalition formed by northern Israel, under Pekah, and Damascus (Syria), under Rezin. These kings wished to compel him to join them in opposing the Assyrians, who were arming a force against the Northern Kingdom under Tiglath-Pileser III (Pul). Isaiah counsels Ahaz to trust in God rather than foreign allies, and tells him to ask for a sign to confirm that this is a true prophecy (verse 7:11). Ahaz refuses, saying he will not test God (7:12). Isaiah replies that Ahaz will have a sign whether he asks for it or not, and the sign will be the birth of a child, and the child's mother will call it Immanuel, meaning "God-with-us" (7:13–14).

To protect himself Ahaz called in the aid of the Assyrians. Tiglath-Pileser sacked Damascus and annexed Aram. According to 2 Kings 16:9, the population of Aram was deported and Rezin executed. Tiglath-Pileser then attacked Israel and "took Ijon, Abel Beth Maacah, Janoah, Kedesh and Hazor. He took Gilead and Galilee, including all the land of Naphtali, and deported the people to Assyria." Tiglath-Pileser also records this act in one of his inscriptions.

Through Assyria's intervention, and as a result of its invasion and subjection of the kingdom of Damascus and the Kingdom of Israel, Ahaz was relieved of his troublesome neighbors; but his protector henceforth claimed and held suzerainty over his kingdom. This war of invasion lasted two years (734–732 BC), and ended in the capture and annexation of Damascus to Assyria and of the territory of Israel north of the border of Jezreel. Ahaz in the meanwhile furnished auxiliaries to Tiglath-Pileser. This appeal to Assyria met with stern opposition from the prophet Isaiah, who counseled Ahaz to rely upon the Lord and not upon outside aid. Ahaz, during his whole reign, was free from troubles with which the neighboring rulers were harassed, who from time to time revolted against Assyria. Thus it was that, in 722, Samaria was taken and northern Israel wholly incorporated into the Assyrian empire.

=== Religious observance ===
Ahaz yielded readily to the glamour and prestige of the Assyrians in religion as well as in politics. In 732, he went to Damascus to swear homage to Tiglath-Pileser and his gods; and, taking a fancy to an altar which he saw there, he had one like it made in Jerusalem, which, with a corresponding change in ritual, he made a permanent feature of the Temple worship. Changes were also made in the arrangements and furniture of the Temple, "because of the king of Assyria" (2 Kings 16:18). Furthermore, Ahaz fitted up an astrological observatory with accompanying sacrifices, after the fashion of the ruling people. In other ways Ahaz lowered the character of the national worship.

2 Kings 16:3 records that Ahaz offered his son by fire to Moloch (or made his son pass through fire), a practice condemned by Leviticus 18:21. The words may refer to a ceremony of purification or a sacrificial offering. The account in 2 Chronicles 28:3 refers to sons (plural).

His government is considered by the Deuteronomistic historian as having been disastrous for the religious state of the country, and a large part of the reforming work of his son Hezekiah was aimed at undoing the evil that Ahaz had done.

== Succession ==
He died at the age of 36 and was succeeded by his son, Hezekiah. Because of his wickedness he was "not brought into the sepulchre of the kings" (2 Chronicles 28:27). An insight into Ahaz's neglect of the worship of the Lord is found in the statement that on the first day of the month of Nisan that followed Ahaz's death, his son Hezekiah commissioned the priests and Levites to open and repair the doors of the Temple and to remove the defilements of the sanctuary, a task which took 16 days.

== Rabbinic literature ==
According to the Talmudic rabbis, who refer to II Chron. xxviii. 19–25, Ahaz was the king who persisted in his wickedness even in the face of all the trials to which he was subjected, and would not repent (Sanh. 103a, Meg. 11a). Worse than this, he threatened Israel's religion to its very foundation, in order to destroy all hope of regeneration. He closed the schools and houses of worship so that no instruction should be possible, and the Shekinah (or Glory of God) should abandon the land. It was for this reason that Isaiah had to teach in secret (Yer. Sanh. x. 28b; Gen. R. xlii.), though Ahaz always humbly submitted to the prophet's rebukes—his only redeeming feature (Sanh. 104a). Abi saved the life of her son Hezekiah, whom her godless husband, Ahaz, had designed as an offering to Moloch. By anointing him with the blood of the salamander, she enabled him to pass through the fire of Moloch unscathed (Sanh. 63b).

== Chronological notes ==
There has been considerable academic debate about the actual dates of reigns of the Israelite kings. Scholars have endeavored to synchronize the chronology of events referred to in the Bible with those derived from other external sources.

The calendars for reckoning the years of kings in Judah and Israel were offset by six months, that of Judah starting in Tishri (in the fall) and that of Israel in Nisan (in the spring). Cross-synchronizations between the two kingdoms therefore often allow narrowing of the beginning or ending dates of a king to within a six-month range. For Ahaz, the Scriptural data allow dating the beginning of his coregency with Jotham to some time in the six-month interval beginning of Nisan 1 of 735 BC. By the Judean calendar that started the regnal year in Tishri (a fall month), this could be written as 736/735, or more simply 736 BC. His father was removed from responsibility by the pro-Assyrian faction at some time in the year that started in Tishri of 732 BC. He died some time between Tishri 1 of 716 BC and Nisan 1 of 715 BC, i.e. in 716/715, or more simply 716 BC.

Rodger Young offers a possible explanation of why four extra years are assigned to Jotham in 2 Kings 15:30 and why Ahaz's 16-year reign (2 Kings 16:2) is measured from the time of Jotham's death in 732/731, instead of when Jotham was deposed in 736/735. Taking into account the factionalism of the time, Young writes:

[A]ny record such as 2 Kings 16:2 that recognized these last four years for Jotham must have come from the annals of the anti-Assyrian and anti-Ahaz court that prevailed after the death of Ahaz. Ahaz is given sixteen years in these annals, measuring from the start of his sole reign, instead of the twenty or twenty-one years that he would be credited with if the counting started from 736t [i.e. 736/735 BC], when he deposed Jotham.

Ahaz of Judah House of David
Regnal titles
Preceded by Jotham	King of Judah; Coregency: 736–732 BC; Sole reign: 732–729 BC; Coregency: 729–716 BC	Succeeded by Hezekiah

== Surviving artifacts ==
In the mid-1990s a bulla appeared on the antiquities market. This bulla measures 0.4 inches (10 mm) wide. The back of the bulla bears the imprint of the papyrus it once sealed, as well as the double string which held it together. It contains a fingerprint on the left edge. Like many bullae, it was preserved due to being baked by fire, presumably incidentally (house or city was burned), as in a kiln. The inscription reads: "Belonging to Ahaz (son of) Yehotam, King of Judah." Given the process that created and preserved bullae, they are virtually impossible to forge, so most scholars believe this bulla to be authentic. It bears the seal of King Ahaz of Judah, who ruled from 732 to 716 BC.

An orange carnelian scaraboid seal dating to the 8th century BC also mentions Ahaz. Its inscription reads, "Belonging to Ushna servant of Ahaz." While Ushna is unknown, the seal refers to Ahaz, king of Judah, who is mentioned in 2 Kings 16. This artifact is currently part of the Yale University's collection of ancient seals.

Another important source regarding the historicity of Ahaz comes from the Tiglath-Pileser III annals, mentioning tributes and payments he received from Ahaz, king of Judah and Menahem, king of Israel. Furthermore, in 2015, Eilat Mazar discovered a royal bulla of the Judean king Hezekiah, biblical son of Ahaz, that reads "Belonging to Hezekiah [son of] Ahaz king of Judah", and dates to between 727 and 698 BC.

== See also ==
- List of biblical figures identified in extra-biblical sources
