= Jotham =

11th king of Judah (c.740–732 BCE)

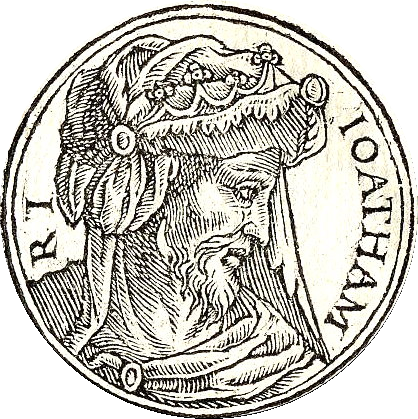
- Jotham from Guillaume Rouillé's Promptuarii Iconum Insigniorum, 1553

King of Judah
- Reign: 16 years c. 740 – 732 BCE
- Predecessor: Uzziah
- Successor: Ahaz
- House: House of David
- Father: Uzziah
- Mother: Jerusha (or Jerushah)

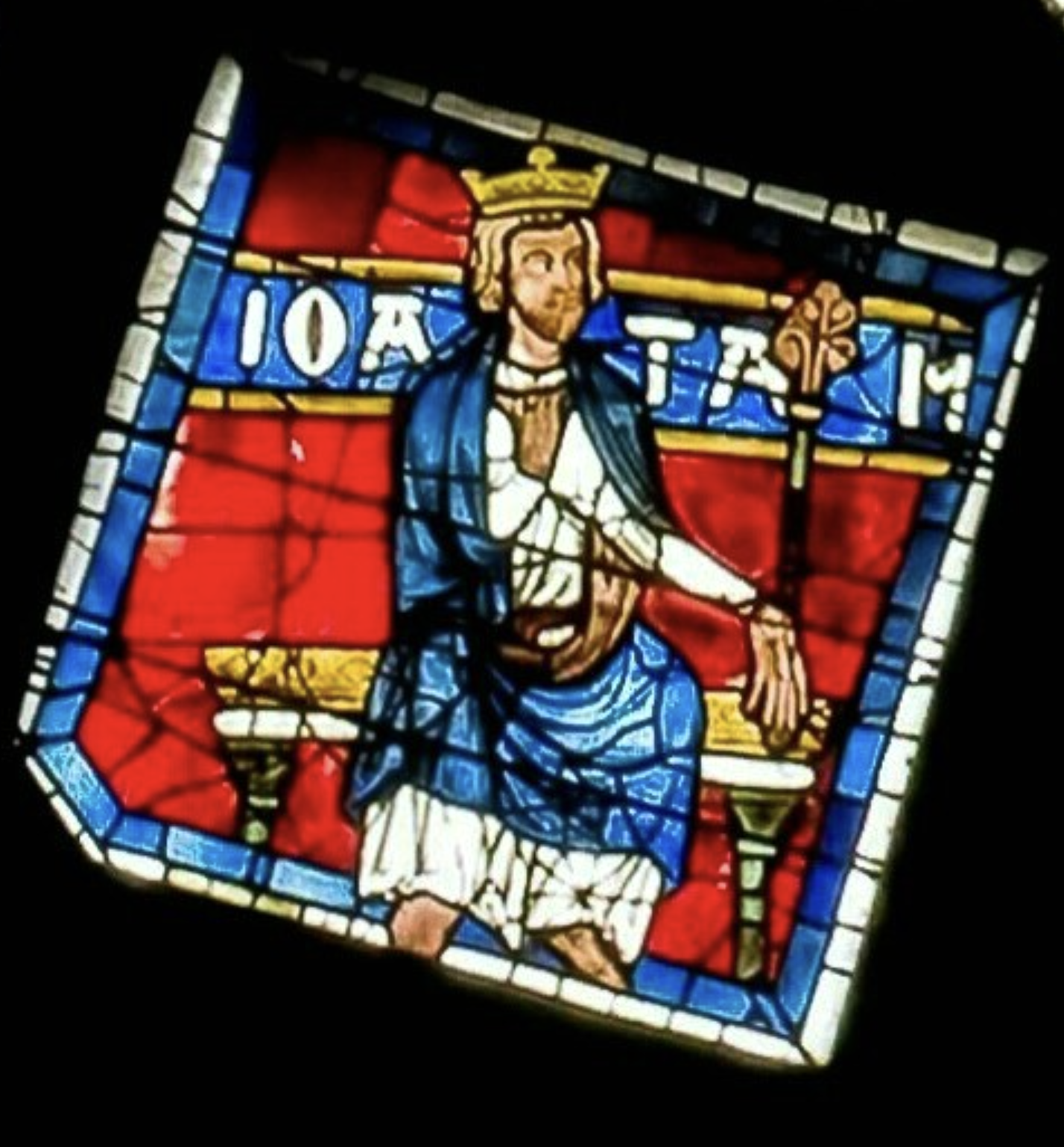
King Jotham of Judah, from the north rose window of Chartres Cathedral

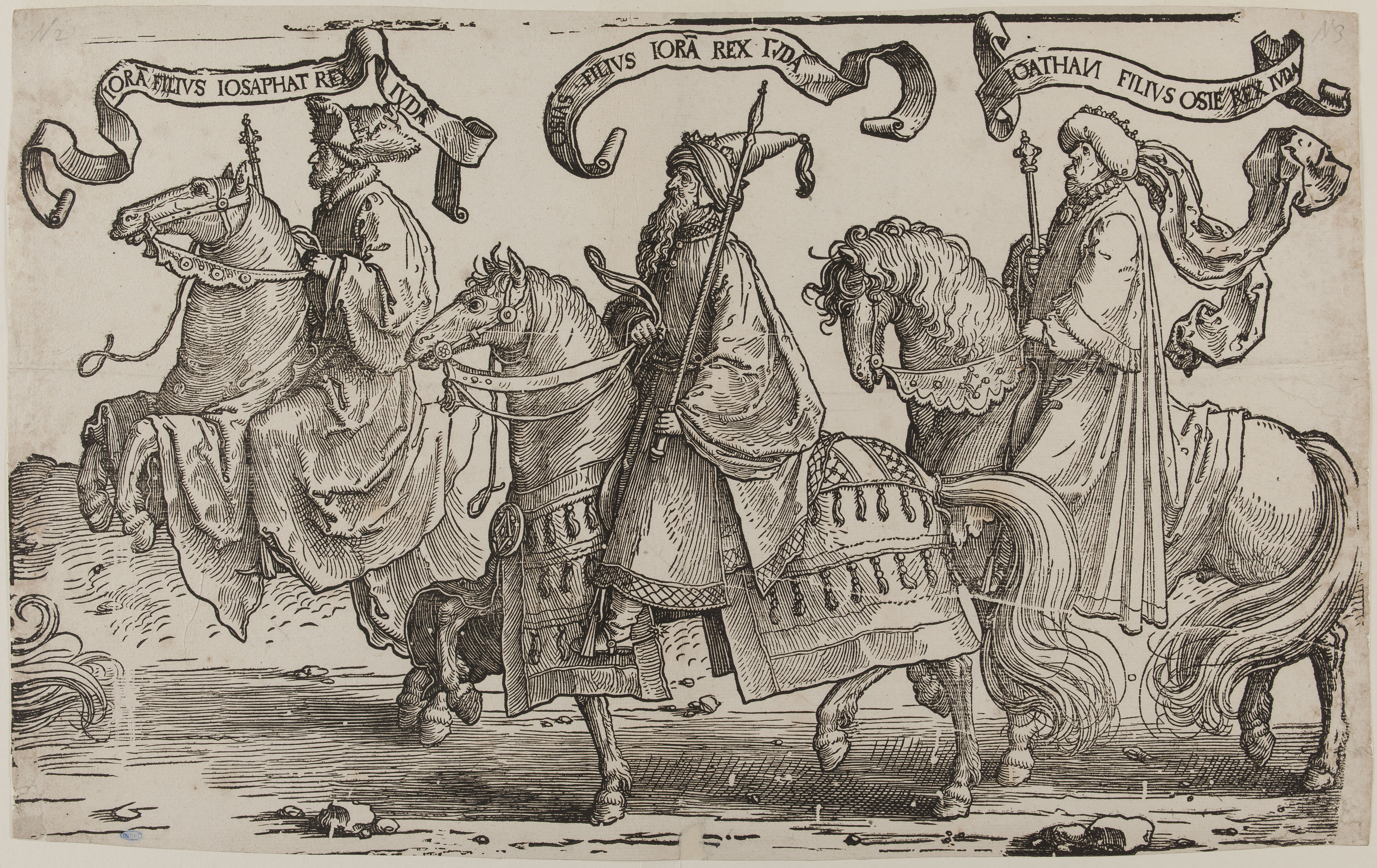
Jehoram, Uzziah, and Jotham, by Lucas van Leyden

Jotham or Yotam (Hebrew: יוֹתָם, Modern: Yōtam, Tiberian: Yōṯām; Greek: Ἰωάθαμ, romanized: Ioatham; Latin: Joatham; "YHWH is perfect") was the eleventh king of Judah, and son of Uzziah and Jerusha, daughter of Zadok. Jotham was 25 years old when he began his reign, and he reigned for 16 years. Edwin R. Thiele concluded that his reign commenced as a coregency with his father, which lasted for 11 years. Because his father Uzziah was afflicted with tzaraath after he went into the Temple to burn incense, Jotham became governor of the palace and the land at that time, i.e. coregent, while his father lived in a separate house as a leper.

William F. Albright dated his reign to 742–735 BCE. Thiele dated his coregency with Uzziah starting in 751/750 BCE and his sole reign from 740/39 to 736/735 BCE, at which time he was deposed by the pro-Assyrian faction in favor of his son Ahaz. Thiele places his death in 732/731 BCE.

The Gospel of Matthew lists Jotham of Judah in the genealogy of Jesus. The archeologist Nelson Glueck found an imprint of king Jotham near Eilat. Also near Eilat there is a wadi called "Yatam wadi".

== Reign ==
Jotham inherited a strong government, well-officered and administered. He is recorded as having built the High or Upper Gate of the Temple in Jerusalem, identified by Matthew Poole as the New Gate mentioned in Jeremiah 36:10. "He built cities in the mountains of Judah, and in the forests he built castles and towers."

2 Kings 15 mentions that Jotham fought wars against Rezin, king of the Arameans, and Pekah, king of Northern Israel (15:37). He also defeated Ammon, which paid him an immense annual tribute. However, the corruption of Northern Israel began to permeate Judah.

Jotham was a contemporary with the prophets Isaiah, Hosea, Amos, and Micah, from whose advice he benefited. He himself is said to have built the upper gate of the house of Yhwh and to have avoided the rashness which allowed his father to enter the Temple (II Chron. xxvii. 2). "He built cities in the mountains of Judah, and in the forests he built castles and towers." He also defeated the Ammonites, who paid him an immense annual tribute. His might is attributed by the Chronicler (ib. xxvii. 6) to his having "ordered his ways before Yhwh, his God."But the increasing corruption of the Northern Kingdom began to permeate Judah, as is seen in the words of Isaiah and Micah. Hosea's references to Judah indicate also a lack of purity of life and worship under Jotham's reign.

== Chronological issues ==
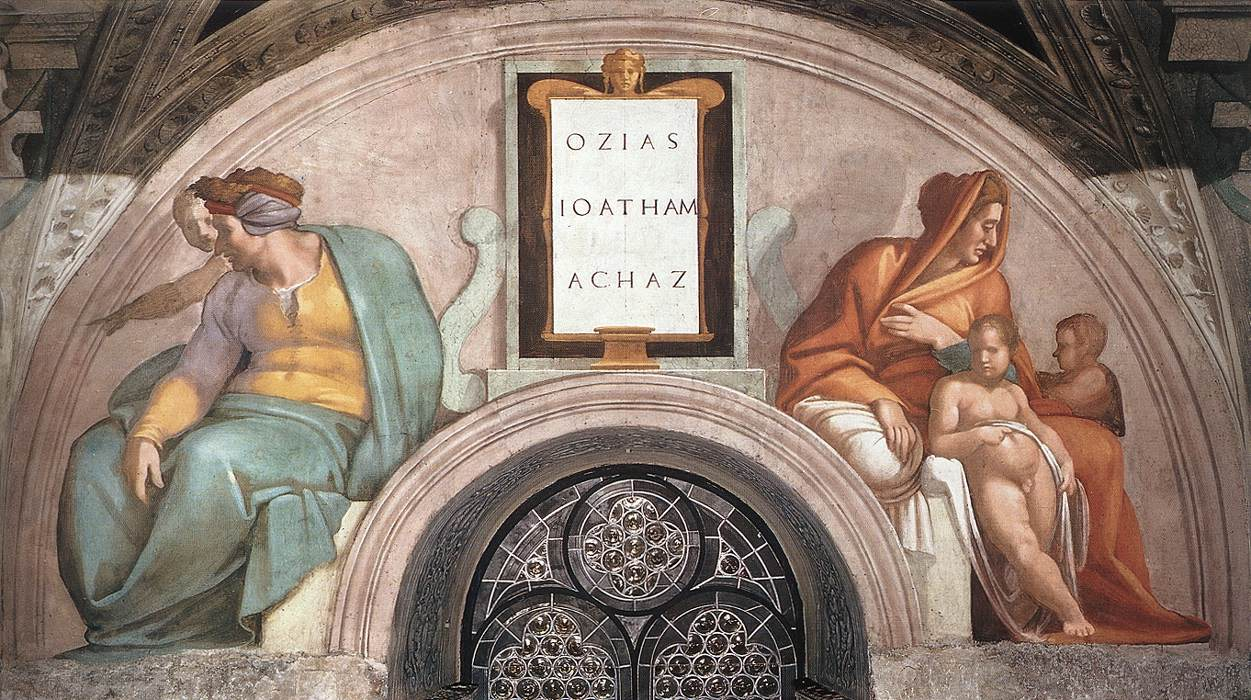
Uzziah, Ioatham and Achaz by Michelangelo Buonarroti, Sistine Chapel lunette, Vatican City. Traditionally Ioatham is the man in green on the left and the child with him is his son Achaz.

Biblical chronologies for the two Israelite kingdoms in the 8th century BC are both profuse and perplexing. Some of the reign lengths or synchronisms are given from the start of a sole reign, while others are given from the start of a coregency, or, in the case of Pekah, from the start of a rival reign. Thiele maintained that the key to understanding these records lies in a proper appreciation of the growing threat from Assyria that both kingdoms faced. In 754 BC, Ashur-nirari V led the Assyrians against Arpad in northern Aram. His successor Tiglath-Pileser III warred against Arpad in the years 743 to 740 BC, capturing the city after three years. In face of this threat, Rezin of Damascus made an alliance with Pekah of Israel, and the two were therefore enemies of the pro-Assyrian king of Judah, Ahaz (Isaiah 7:1). Meanwhile, Menahem, ruling in Samaria, sent tribute to Tiglath-Pileser (Biblical Pul) to "strengthen his hold on the kingdom," (2 Kings 15:19), apparently against his anti-Assyrian rival Pekah. According to Thiele, it is the existence of strong pro-Assyrian and anti-Assyrian factions in both Israel and Judah that explains the way the chronological data for the time were recorded:

When Jotham began his rule in Judah his reign was synchronized with that of Pekah and not with Menahem, although both were then on their thrones. This points to close Judean ties with Pekah than with Menahem, and a common resistance against the Assyrian threat could well have been the cause. The fact that Jotham's accession in 751/50 is synchronized with the years of Pekah provides strong evidence that Pekah was then ruling as king. And the fact that Ahaz's accession in 736/35 is likewise synchronized with a reign of Pekah that began in 752/51 provides further proof that it was at that time that Pekah began his reign. These synchronisms of II Kings 15:32 and 16:1 are not artificial and they are not late. No scribe of a later period unacquainted with the historical details of the time would, or could, have invented them.

In Judah, the growing Assyrian pressure strengthened the hand of those who sought accommodation to the enemy from the north, resulting in a change of leadership:

In 736 and 735 Tiglath-pileser was again in the northwest, in the regions of Mount Nal and Urartu. Many in Judah would no doubt think that the time had come to submit or be crushed. In 735 it is altogether likely that a pro-Assyrian group felt itself strong enough to force Jotham into retirement and to place Ahaz on the throne. Although Jotham continued to live to his (Ahaz') twentieth year (II Kings 15:30), 732/31, it was Ahaz who directed affairs from 735.

Thiele therefore explained the reason for the complexity of the chronological data for this time by taking into account the historical background. He then found that the regnal years for Judah and Israel that can be constructed from the Biblical texts fit into the known movements of the Assyrian kings during this time.

== Further chronological notes ==
The calendars for reckoning the years of kings in Judah and Israel were offset by six months, that of Judah starting in Tishri (in the fall) and that of Israel in Nisan (in the spring). Cross-synchronizations between the two kingdoms therefore often allow narrowing of the beginning or ending dates of a king to within a six-month range. For Jotham, the Scriptural data allow the narrowing of the beginning of his coregency with Uzziah as occurring some time in the six-month interval on or following Nisan 1, 750 BCE. In terms of Judean reckoning, this would be in the year that started in Tishri of 751 BCE. His sole reign began in the year that started on Tishri 1, 740 BCE, and its end was in the six-month interval that started on Nisan 1, 735 BCE. His death occurred in the year that started in Tishri, 732 BCE.

== Archeological findings ==
In the mid-1990s, an inscribed bulla seal belonging to Jotham's son, Ahaz, showed up on the antiquities market. The inscription read, "Belonging to Ahaz (son of) Yehotam, King of Judah". As the seal was unprovenanced, its authenticity is not universally agreed upon, though given the process which make and preserve bullae, it is generally agreed that faking a seal, while not impossible, is difficult. If genuine, it is perhaps the sole archaeological attestation of Jotham found to date.

== See also ==
- List of biblical figures identified in extra-biblical sources

== Notes ==
Jotham House of David
| Preceded by Uzziah | King of Judah; Coregency: 751–740 BCE; Sole reign: 740–736 BCE; Deposed, then died: 736–732 BCE | Succeeded by Ahaz |
