= Menahem =

Biblical character

Menahem מְנַחֵם
- King of Israel
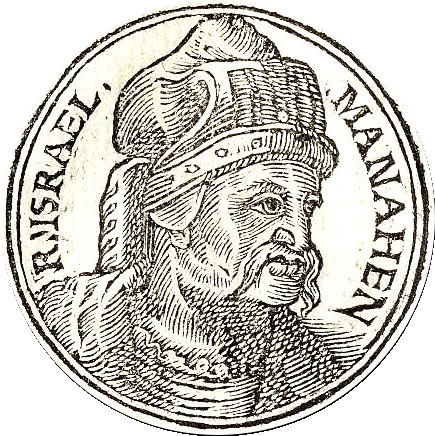
- Menahem from Guillaume Rouillé's Promptuarii Iconum Insigniorum.

King of Israel (Northern Kingdom)
- Reign: c. 752 – c. 742 BC
- Predecessor: Shallum
- Successor: Pekahiah
- Issue: Pekahiah
- Father: Gadi

Menahem or Menachem (Hebrew: מְנַחֵם, Modern: Mənaḥēm, Tiberian: Menaḥēm, "consoler" or "comforter"; Akkadian: 𒈪𒉌𒄭𒅎𒈨 Meniḫîmme [me-ni-ḫi-im-me]; Greek: Μεναέμ Manaem or Μαναὴμ Manaēm in the Septuagint, Μεναέν Manaen in Aquila; Latin: Manahem; full name: Hebrew: מְנַחֵם בֵּן-גדי, Menahem son of Gadi) was the sixteenth king of the northern Israelite Kingdom of Israel. He was the son of Gadi, and the founder of the dynasty known as the House of Gadi or House of Menahem.

== The Bible ==
=== Biblical narrative ===
Menahem's ten-year reign is told in 2 Kings 15:14–22. When Shallum conspired against and assassinated Zechariah in Samaria, and set himself upon the throne of the northern kingdom, Menahem—who, like Shallum, had served as a captain in Zechariah's army—refused to recognize the murderous usurper. Menahem marched from Tirzah to Samaria, about six miles westwards, and laid siege to Samaria. He took the city, murdered Shallum a month into his reign (2 Kings 15:13), and set himself upon the throne. (2 Kings 15:14) According to Josephus, he was a general of the army of Israel.

He did brutally suppress a revolt at Tiphsah. He destroyed the city and put all its inhabitants to death, even ripping open the pregnant women. (2 Kings 15:16)

=== Authorship ===
The author of the Books of Kings describes Menahem in a negative light and his rule as one of cruelty and oppression. Menahem is called a commander in the army, not a legitimate heir to the throne, and the author avoids using the title King of Israel/Samaria. The author is using an older source, apparently synopsizing the "annals of the Kings of Israel" (2 Kings 15:21) and gives scant details of Menahem's reign.

== Chronology ==
Accession. In 2 Kings 15:17, Menahem (the son of Gadi) began to reign over "Israel" in "Year 39 of Azariah, the King of Judah", and reigned "ten years in Samaria".

Succession. In 2 Kings 15:22, Menaham died (seemingly a natural death) and was succeeded by his son, Pekahiah. In 2 Kings 15:23, Pekahia began his reign in "Year 50 of Azariah, the King of Judah".

According to the chronology of Kautsch, he ruled from 743 BC; according to Schrader, from 745 to 736 BC. William F. Albright has dated his reign from 745 to 738 BC, while E. R. Thiele offers the dates 752–742 BC.

New Year Celebration. The Northern Kingdom of Israel (Samaria) celebrated New Year (start of the king's regnal year) in the month of Nisan (in spring around March-April, Assyrian tradition following the agricultural calendar), while the Southern Kingdom of Judah celebrated New Year in the month of Tishrei (September-October, Egyptian tradition where 1 Akhet Day 1 was on 11. September marking the start of its Inundation season, whereas Judah would more likely use the autumn equinox as anchor). Thus the regnal Year 39 of Azariah had already started in the month of Tishrei, when the regnal Year 1 of Menahem began in the month of Nisan. In addition, the author of 2 Kings is writing from the perspective of Judah, linking the northern king chronologically to the reign of the southern king.

== History ==
The "Annals of the Kings of Israel" was not preserved. The Biblical narrative in 2 Kings was finalized some time after the Babylonian Exile and was biased towards Judah, making it a secondary source. However, the story of Menahem is also known from the Annals of Tiglath-Pileser III. Menahem paid tribute to Tiglath-Pileser III as his overlord.

=== Tributary of Assyria ===
Tiglath-Pileser III of Assyria began his reign in 745 BC, seven years after Menahem had become king of Israel.

During Menahem's reign, the Assyrians first entered the kingdom of Israel, and had also invaded Aram Damascus to the north-east: "And Pul, king of the Assyrians, came into the land". (2 Kings 15:19) The Assyrians may have been invited into Israel by the Assyrian party. Hosea speaks of the two anti-Israelite parties, the Egyptian and Assyrian. (Hosea 7:11)

To maintain independence, Menahem was forced to pay a tribute of a thousand talents of silver (2 Kings 15:19)—which is about 37 tons (about 34 metric tons) of silver. It is now generally accepted that Pul referred to in 2 Kings 15:19 is Tiglath-Pileser III of the cuneiform inscriptions. Pul was probably his personal name and the one that first reached Israel. Tiglath-Pileser records this tribute in one of his inscriptions (ANET^{3} 283).

To pay the tribute, Menahem exacted fifty shekels of silver—about 1 1/4 pounds or 0.6 kg—from all the mighty men of wealth of the kingdom. (2 Kings 15:20) To collect this amount, there would have had to be at the time some 60,000 "that were mighty and rich" in the kingdom. After receiving the tribute, Tiglath-Pileser returned to Assyria. However, from that time the kingdom of Israel was a tributary of Assyria; and when Pekah some ten years later refused to pay any more tribute, it started a sequence of events which led to the destruction of the kingdom and the deportation of its population.

== See also ==
- List of biblical figures identified in extra-biblical sources
- Iran Stele

== Sources ==
Menahem House of Gadi; Contemporary King of Judah: Uzziah/Azariah, Jotham
Regnal titles
Preceded by Shallum	King of Israel; 752–742 BCE	Succeeded by Pekahiah
