= Elah (king) =

King of Israel in the 9th century BCE

Elah אֵלָה
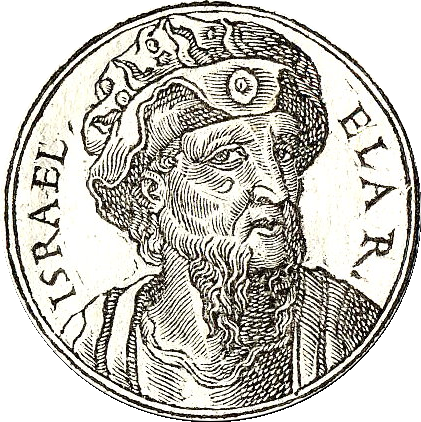
- Portrait from Promptuarium Iconum Insigniorum (1553) by Guillaume Rouillé

King of Israel (Northern Kingdom)
- Reign: 886–885 BCE
- Predecessor: Baasha
- Successor: Zimri
- Died: c. 885 BC

Elah (Hebrew: אֵלָה ’Ēlā; Greek: Ἠλά; Latin: Ela) was the fourth king of Israel, the son and successor of Baasha. William F. Albright has dated his reign to 877–876 BCE, while E. R. Thiele offers the dates 886–885 BCE.

Chapter 16 of 1 Kings relates how Elah and all his family members were murdered by his chariot commander Zimri, who became his successor.

Elah (king) Tribe of Issachar; Contemporary Kings of Judah: Asa
Regnal titles
Preceded by Baasha	King of Israel; 886–885 BCE	Succeeded by Zimri
