= Janohah =

Janoah or Janohah (Hebrew: יָנוֹחַ Yānōaḥ) is the name of one or more places mentioned in the Bible.

== Etymology ==
Janohah means "he rests" in Hebrew.

== Places in the Bible ==
The Book of Joshua (Joshua 16:6, 7), places a Janohah on the northern border of the Tribe of Ephraim: "the border went about eastward unto Taanathshiloh, and passed by it on the east to Janohah; And it went down from Janohah to Ataroth". The site of Janohah is thought by some to be at Yanun or nearby Khirbet Yanun, but this is not certain.

A Janohah is also mentioned in the Second Book of Kings (2 Kings 15:29): "came Tiglath-Pileser I king of Assyria, and took Ijon, and Abel-beth-maachah, and Janoah, and Kedesh, and Hazor, and Gilead, and Galilee, all the land of Naphtali, and carried them captive to Assyria".
