= Kingdom of Israel (Samaria) =

Israelite kingdom in the Southern Levant

Kingdom of Israel 𐤉𐤔𐤓𐤀𐤋
- c. 930 BCE–c. 720 BCE
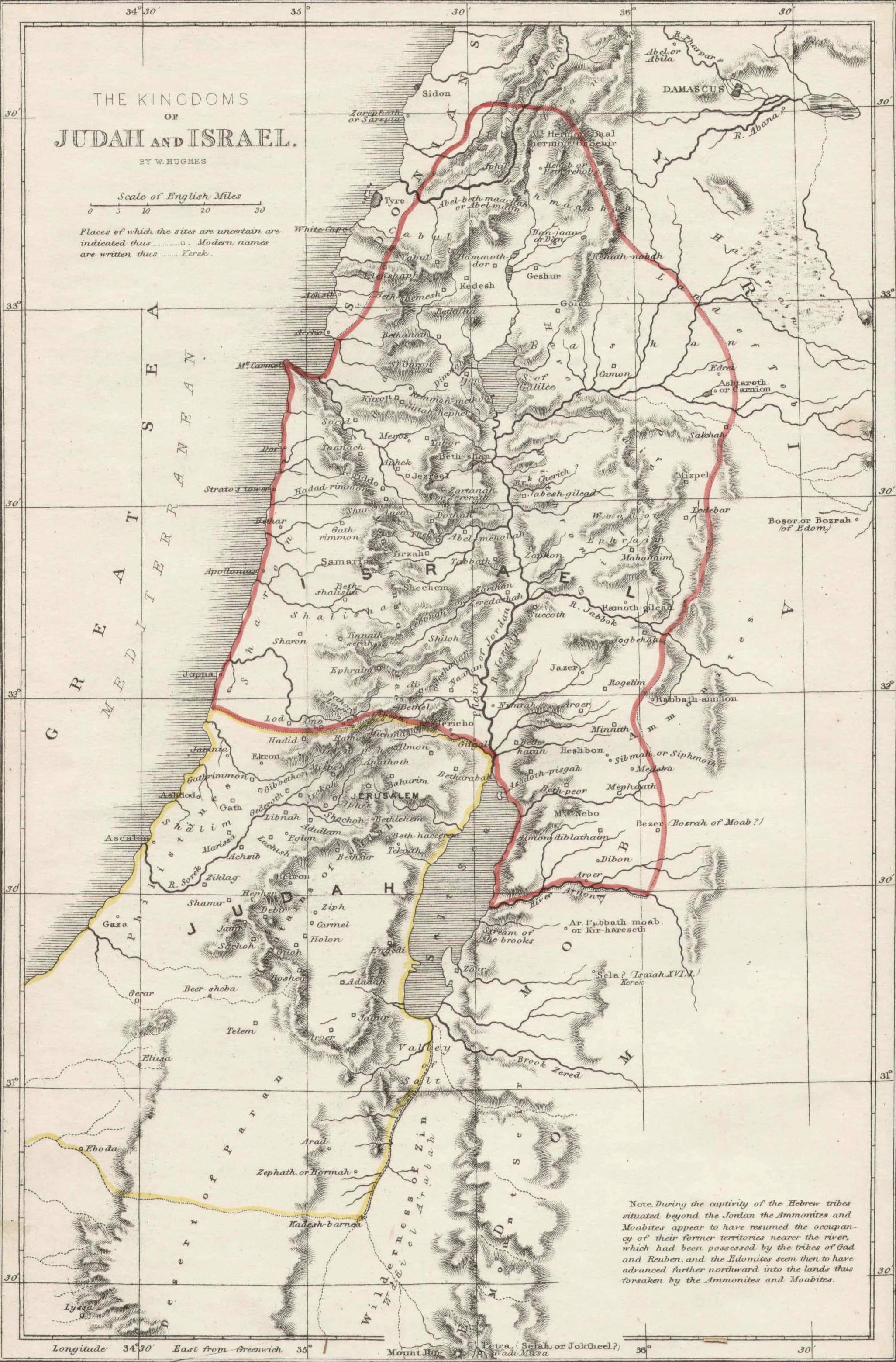
- Status: Kingdom
- Capital: Shiloh (c. 1000–931 BCE); Shechem (c. 931–909 BCE); Tirzah (c. 909–880 BCE); Samaria (c. 880–720 BCE)
- Common languages: Hebrew (Biblical, Israelian)
- Religion: Yahwism, other Semitic religions
- Demonym: Israelite
- Government: Monarchy
- King
  - 931–910 BCE: Jeroboam I (first)
  - 732–c. 720 BCE: Hoshea (last)
- Historical era: Iron Age
  - Established: c. 930 BCE
  - Assyrian conquest: c. 720 BCE
| Preceded by | Succeeded by |
| Twelve Tribes of Israel | Samerina (Assyrian province) |
- Today part of: Israel; Palestine (West Bank); Jordan; Lebanon; Syria

The Kingdom of Israel (Biblical Hebrew: מַמְלֶכֶת יִשְׂרָאֵל, romanized: Mamleḵeṯ Yiśrāʾēl), also called the Kingdom of Samaria or the Northern Kingdom, was an Israelite kingdom that existed in the Southern Levant during the Iron Age. Its beginnings date back to the first half of the 10th century BCE. It controlled the areas of Samaria, Galilee and parts of Transjordan; the former two regions underwent a period in which a large number of new settlements were established shortly after the kingdom came into existence. It had four capital cities in succession: Shiloh, Shechem, Tirzah, and the city of Samaria. In the 9th century BCE, the House of Omri ruled it, whose political centre was the city of Samaria.

According to the Hebrew Bible, the territory of the Twelve Tribes of Israel was once amalgamated under a Kingdom of Israel and Judah, which was ruled by the House of Saul and then by the House of David. However, upon the death of Solomon, who was the son and successor of David, there was discontent over his son and successor Rehoboam, whose reign was only accepted by the Tribe of Judah and the Tribe of Benjamin. The unpopularity of Rehoboam's reign among the rest of the Israelites, who sought Jeroboam as their monarch, resulted in Jeroboam's Revolt, which led to the establishment of the Kingdom of Israel in the north (Samaria), whereas the loyalists of Judah and Benjamin kept Rehoboam as their monarch and established the Kingdom of Judah in the south (Judea), ending Israelite political unity. While the existence of Israel and Judah as two independent kingdoms is not disputed, some historians and archaeologists reject the historicity of a United Monarchy of Israel and Judah. (Note: The debate is described in Amihai Mazar (2010), "Archaeology and the Biblical Narrative: The Case of the United Monarchy", pp. 29-30, fn. 2: "For conservative approaches defining the United Monarchy as a state 'from Dan to Beer Sheba' including 'conquered kingdoms' (Ammon, Moab, Edom) and 'spheres of influence' in Geshur and Hamath cf. e.g. Ahlström (1993), 455–542; Meyers (1998); Lemaire (1999); Masters (2001); Stager (2003); Rainey (2006), 159–168; Kitchen (1997); Millard (1997; 2008). For a total denial of the historicity of the United Monarchy cf. e.g. Davies (1992), 67–68; others suggested a 'chiefdom' comprising a small region around Jerusalem, cf. Knauf (1997), 81–85; Niemann (1997), 252–299 and Finkelstein (1999). For a 'middle of the road' approach suggesting a United Monarchy of larger territorial scope though smaller than the biblical description cf. e.g. Miller (1997); Halpern (2001), 229–262; Liverani (2005), 92–101. The latter recently suggested a state comprising the territories of Judah and Ephraim during the time of David, that was subsequently enlarged to include areas of northern Samaria and influence areas in the Galilee and Transjordan. Na'aman (1992; 1996) once accepted the basic biography of David as authentic and later rejected the United Monarchy as a state, cf. id. (2007), 401–402.")

Around 720 BCE, Israel was conquered by the Neo-Assyrian Empire. The records of Assyrian king Sargon II indicate that he deported 27,290 Israelites to Mesopotamia. This deportation resulted in the loss of one-fifth of the kingdom's population and is known as the Assyrian captivity, which gave rise to the notion of the Ten Lost Tribes. Some of these Israelites, however, managed to migrate to safety in neighbouring Judah, though the Judahites themselves would be conquered by the Neo-Babylonian Empire less than 1.5 centuries later. Those who stayed behind in Samaria following the Assyrian conquest mainly concentrated themselves around Mount Gerizim and eventually came to be known as the Samaritans. The Assyrians, as part of their historic deportation policy, also settled other conquered foreign populations in the territory of Israel.

== History ==
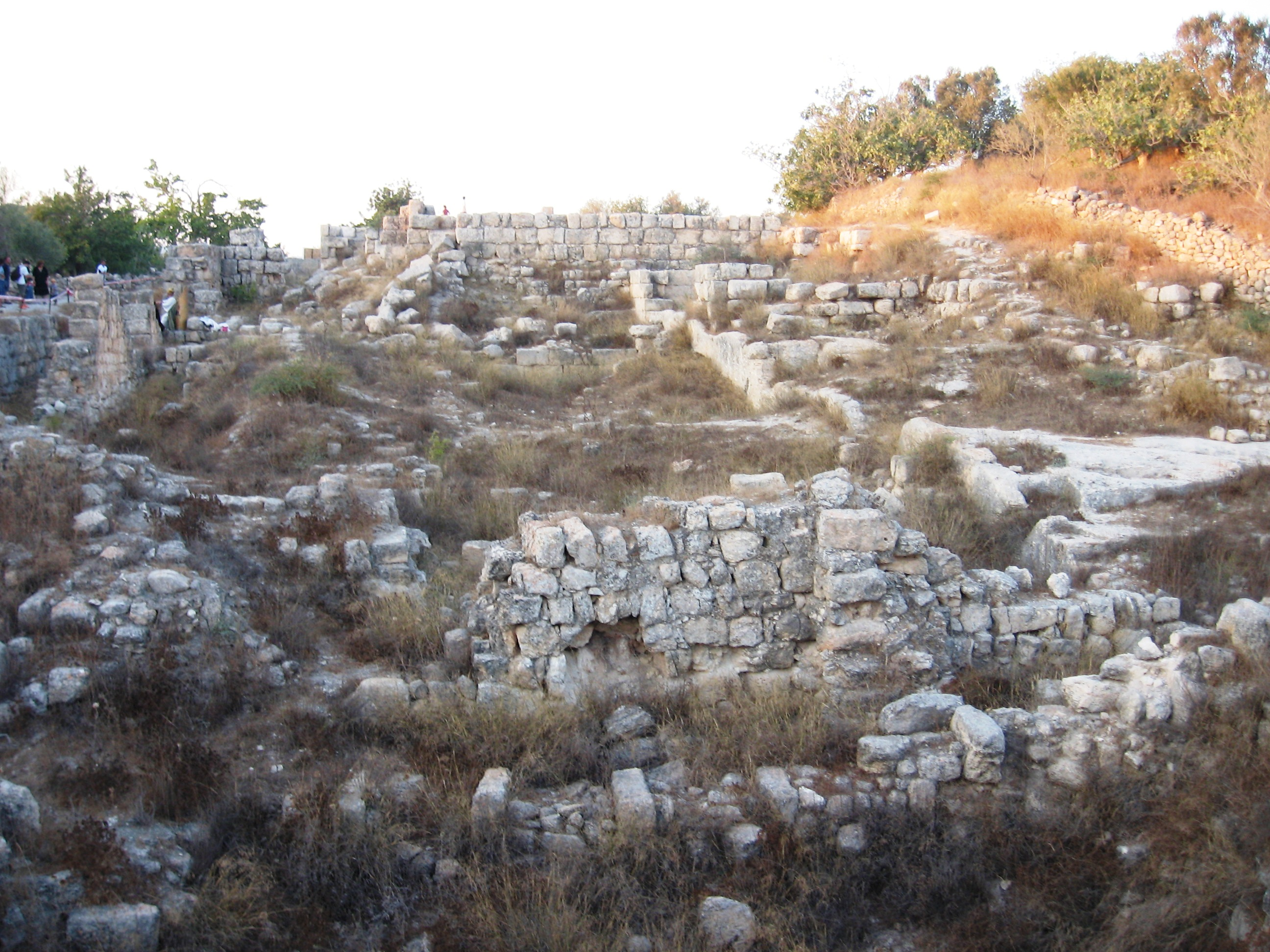
Ruins of the royal palace of the Omiride dynasty in the city of Samaria, which was the capital of Israel from 880 BCE to 720 BCE.

According to Israel Finkelstein, Shoshenq I's campaign in the second half of the 10th century BCE caused the collapse of the early polity of Gibeon in the central highlands, and made possible the beginning of the Northern Kingdom, with its capital at Shechem, around 931 BCE. Israel was consolidated as a kingdom in the first half of 9th century BCE, with its capital at Tirzah first, and next at the city of Samaria from 880 BCE. The existence of this Israelite state in the north is documented in 9th century BCE inscriptions. The earliest mention is from the Kurkh stela of c. 853 BCE, when Shalmaneser III mentions "Ahab the Israelite", plus the denominative for "land", and his ten thousand troops. This kingdom would have included parts of the lowlands (the Shephelah), the Jezreel plain, lower Galilee and parts of the Transjordan.

Ahab's forces were part of an anti-Assyrian coalition, implying that an urban elite ruled the kingdom, possessed a royal and state cult with large urban temples, and had scribes, mercenaries, and an administrative apparatus. In all this, it was similar to other recently founded kingdoms of the time, such as Ammon and Moab. Samaria is one of the most universally accepted archaeological sites from the biblical period. In around 840 BCE, the Mesha Stele records the victory of Moab (in today's Jordan), under King Mesha, over Israel, King Omri and his son Ahab.

Archaeological finds, ancient Near Eastern texts, and the biblical record testify that in the time of the Omrides, Israel ruled in the mountainous Galilee, at Hazor in the upper Jordan Valley, in large parts of Transjordan between the Wadi Mujib and the Yarmuk, and in the coastal Sharon plain.

In Assyrian inscriptions, the Kingdom of Israel is referred to as the "House of ʻOmri". The Black Obelisk of Shalmaneser III mentions Jehu, son of ʻOmri. The Neo-Assyrian emperor Adad-nirari III made an expedition into the Levant around 803 BCE mentioned in the Nimrud slab, which lists the places he went to, sometimes using the apellative for "land", mat: the Hatti and Amurru lands, Tyre, Sidon, the mat of Hu-um-ri (^{mat}Hu-um-ri, "land of ʻOmri"), Edom, Philistia, and Aram (not Judah). The Tell al-Rimah stela of the same king introduces a third way of talking about the kingdom, as Samaria, in the phrase "Joash of Samaria". The use of Omri's name to refer to the kingdom still survived, and was used by Sargon II in the phrase "the whole house of Omri" in describing his conquest of the city of Samaria in 722 BCE. It is significant that the Assyrians never mention the Kingdom of Judah until the end of the 8th century, when it was an Assyrian vassal state: possibly they never had contact with it, or possibly they regarded it as a vassal of Israel/Samaria or Aram, or possibly the southern kingdom did not exist during this period.

== In the Hebrew Bible ==
One traditional source for the history of the Kingdom of Israel has been the Hebrew Bible, especially the Books of Kings and Chronicles. These books were written by authors in Jerusalem, the capital of the Kingdom of Judah. Being written in a rival kingdom, they were inspired by ideological and theological viewpoints that influence the narrative. Anachronisms, legends and literary forms also affect the story. Some of the recorded events are believed to have occurred long after the destruction of the kingdom of Israel. Biblical archaeology has both confirmed and challenged parts of the biblical account. According to the Hebrew Bible, there existed a United Kingdom of Israel (the United Monarchy), ruled from Jerusalem by David and his son Solomon, after whose death Israel and Judah separated into two kingdoms.

The first mention of the name Israel is from an Egyptian inscription, the Merneptah Stele, dating from the Late Bronze Age (c. 1208 BCE); this gives little solid information, but indicates that the name of the later kingdom was borrowed rather than originating with the kingdom itself.

=== Relationship with the Kingdom of Judah ===
According to the Hebrew Bible, for the first sixty years after the split, the kings of Judah tried to re-establish their authority over the northern kingdom, and there was perpetual war between them. For the following eighty years, there was no open war between them, as, for the most part, Judah had engaged in a military alliance with Aram-Damascus, opening a northern front against Israel. The conflict between Israel and Judah was temporarily settled when Jehoshaphat, King of Judah, allied himself with the reigning house of Israel, Ahab, through marriage. Later, Jehosophat's son and successor, Jehoram of Judah, married Ahab's daughter Athaliah, cementing the alliance. However, the sons of Ahab were slaughtered by Jehu following his coup d'état around 840 BCE.

=== From Hazael to Jeroboam II ===
After being defeated by Hazael, Israel began a period of progressive recovery following the campaigns against Aram-Damascus of the Assyrian Adad-nirari III. This ultimately led to a period of major territorial expansion under Jeroboam II, who extended the kingdom's possessions throughout the Northern Transjordan. Following Jeroboam II's death, the Kingdom experienced a period of decline as a result of sectional rivalries and struggles for the throne.

=== Conquest by the Neo-Assyrian Empire (732–720 BCE) ===
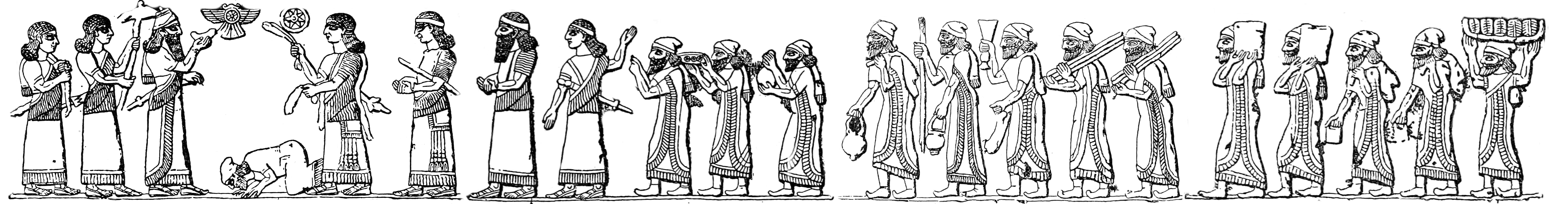
Jehu's delegation to Shalmaneser III, Black Obelisk, 841–840 BCE.

In c. 732 BCE, King Pekah of Israel, while allied with Rezin, king of Aram, threatened Jerusalem. Ahaz, King of Judah, appealed to Tiglath-Pileser III, the King of Assyria, for help. After Ahaz paid tribute to Tiglath-Pileser, Tiglath-Pileser sacked Damascus and Israel, annexing Aram and the territories of the tribes of Reuben, Gad and Manasseh in Gilead, including the desert outposts of Jetur, Naphish and Nodab. People from these tribes, including the Reubenite leader, were taken captive and resettled in the region of the Khabur River system, in Halah, Habor, Hara and Gozan (1 Chronicles 5:26). Tiglath-Pilesar also captured the territory of Naphtali and the city of Janoah in Ephraim, and an Assyrian governor was placed over the region of Naphtali. According to 2 Kings 16:9 and 2 Kings 15:29, the population of Aram and the annexed part of Israel was deported to Assyria.

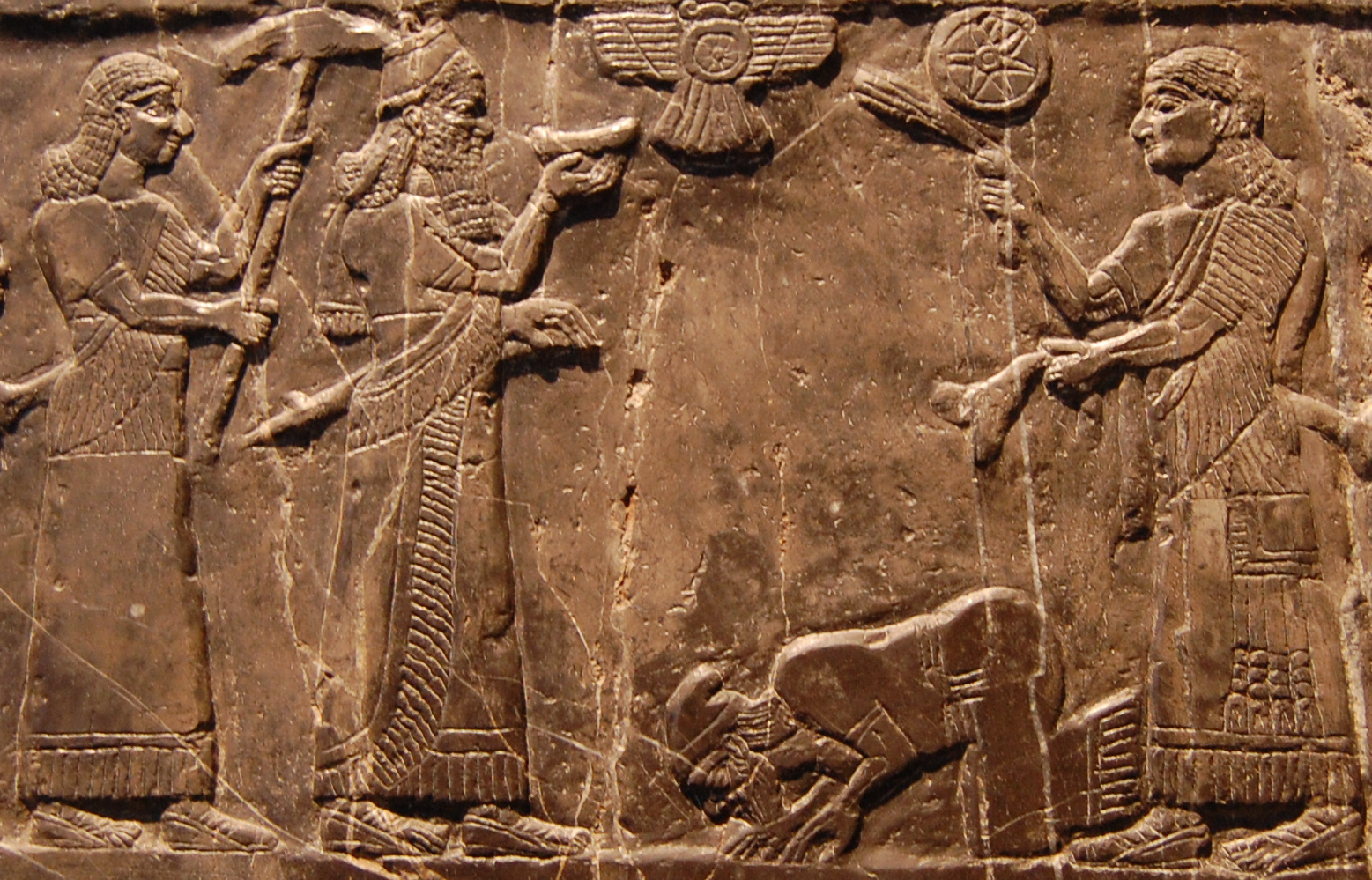
The tribute of Israel's king "Jehu of the people of the land of Omri" (Akkadian: 𒅀𒌑𒀀 𒈥 𒄷𒌝𒊑𒄿), as depicted on the Black Obelisk of Shalmaneser III from 841 to 840 BCE. This is "the only portrayal we have in ancient Near Eastern art of an Israelite or Judaean monarch."

The remainder of the northern kingdom of Israel continued to exist within the reduced territory as an independent kingdom until around 720 BCE, when it was again invaded by Assyria and more of the population was deported. Not all of Israel's populace was deported by the Assyrians. During the three-year siege of Samaria in the territory of Ephraim by the Assyrians, Shalmaneser V died and was succeeded by Sargon II, who himself records the capture of that city thus: "Samaria I looked at, I captured; 27,280 men who dwelt in it I carried away" into Assyria. Thus, around 720 BCE, after two centuries, the northern kingdom came to an end. Some of the Israelite captives were resettled in the Khabur region, and the rest in the land of the Medes, thus establishing Hebrew communities in Ecbatana and Rages. The Book of Tobit additionally records that Sargon had taken other captives from the northern kingdom to the Assyrian capital of Nineveh, in particular Tobit from the town of Thisbe in Naphtali.

The Hebrew Bible relates that the population of the Kingdom of Israel was exiled, becoming known as the Ten Lost Tribes. To the south, the Tribe of Judah, the Tribe of Simeon (that was "absorbed" into Judah), the Tribe of Benjamin and the people of the Tribe of Levi, who lived among them of the original Israelite nation, remained in the southern Kingdom of Judah. The Kingdom of Judah continued to exist as an independent state until 586 BCE, when it was conquered by the Neo-Babylonian Empire.

==== Samaritan tradition ====
The tradition of the Samaritan people states that much of the population of the Kingdom of Israel remained in place after the Assyrian captivity, including the Tribes of Naphtali, Manasseh, Benjamin and Levi – being the progenitors of the modern Samaritans. Many members of these northern tribes also fled south to the Kingdom of Judah. Jerusalem seems to have expanded in size five-fold during this period, requiring a new wall to be built, and a new source of water Siloam to be provided by King Hezekiah.

==== Recorded accounts ====
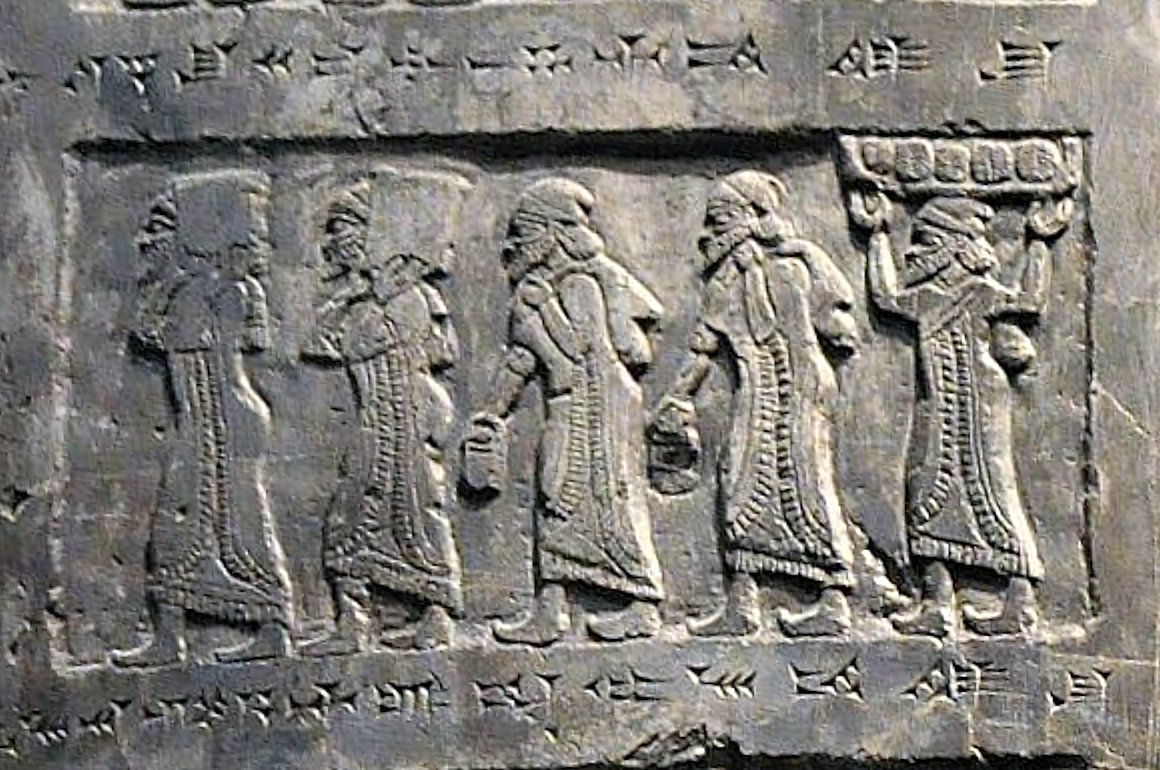
Part of the gift-bearing Israelite delegation of King Jehu, as depicted on the Black Obelisk of Shalmaneser III (841–840 BCE)

In their book The Bible Unearthed, Israeli authors Israel Finkelstein and Neil Asher Silberman estimate that only a fifth (about 40,000) of the population of the northern Kingdom of Israel were actually resettled out of the area during the two deportation periods under Tiglath-Pileser III and Sargon II. No known non-Biblical record exists of the Assyrians having exiled people from four of the tribes of Israel: Dan, Asher, Issachar, Zebulun. Descriptions of the deportation of people from Reuben, Gad, Manasseh, Ephraim and Naphtali indicate that only a portion of these tribes were deported, and the places to which they were deported are known locations given in the accounts. The deported communities are mentioned as still existing at the time of the composition of the Books of Kings and Chronicles and did not disappear by assimilation. 2 Chronicles 30:1–18 explicitly mentions northern Israelites who had been spared by the Assyrians, in particular people of Ephraim, Manasseh, Asher, Issachar and Zebulun, and how members of the latter three returned to worship at the Temple in Jerusalem during the reign of Hezekiah.

Map of the Assyrian captivity, showing the routes of the deported population of Israel after the kingdom was conquered by the Neo-Assyrian Empire in 720 BCE.

=== Religion ===
The religion of the Kingdom of Israel appears to have followed two major trends. The first was the worship of Yahweh; the religion of ancient Israel is sometimes referred to by modern scholars as Yahwism. The Hebrew Bible, however, states that some of the northern Israelites also adored Baal, a title for Hadad, a weather god whose worship was centered at Jebel Aqra (Hebrew Ṣafon; see 1 Kings 16:31 and the Baal Cycle discovered at Ugarit). The reference in Hosea 10 to Israel's "divided heart" may refer to these two cultic observances, although alternatively it may refer to hesitation between looking to Assyria and Egypt for support.

The Jewish Bible also states that Ahab allowed the cult worship of Baal to become acceptable within the kingdom. His wife Jezebel was the daughter of the Phoenician king of Tyre and a devotee to Baal worship (1 Kings 16:31).

=== Dynasties ===
According to the Bible, the Northern Kingdom had 19 kings across 9 different dynasties throughout its 208 years of existence.

The genealogy of the kings of the United Kingdom of Israel and Judea, the Kingdom of Israel and the kings of the Kingdom of Judah. Most historians follow either of the older chronologies established by William F. Albright or Edwin R. Thiele, or the newer chronologies of Gershon Galil and Kenneth Kitchen, all of which are shown below. All dates are BC/BCE.

== Mentions of Israel/Samaria in Assyrian literature and inscriptions ==
The table below lists all the historical references to the Kingdom of Israel (Samaria) in Assyrian records. King Omri's name takes the Assyrian shape of "Humri", his kingdom or dynasty that of Bit Humri or alike—the "House of Humri/Omri".

| Assyrian King | Inscription | Year | Transliteration | Translation |
|---|---|---|---|---|
| Shalmaneser III | Kurkh Monoliths | 853 BCE | KUR sir-'i-la-a-a | "Israel" |
| Shalmaneser III | Black Obelisk, Calah Fragment, Kurba'il Stone, Ashur Stone | 841 BCE | mar Hu-um-ri-i | "of Omri" |
| Adad-nirari III | Tell al-Rimah Stela | 803 BCE | KUR Sa-me-ri-na-a-a | "land of Samaria" |
| Adad-nirari III | Nimrud Slab | 803 BCE | KUR <Bit>-Hu-um-ri-i | "the 'land of [the House of] Omri" |
| Tiglath-Pileser III | Layard 45b+ III R 9,1 | 740 BCE | [KUR sa-me-ri-i-na-a-a] | ["land of Samaria"] |
| Tiglath-Pileser III | Iran Stela | 739–738 BCE | KUR sa-m[e]-ri-i-na-a-[a] | "land of Samaria" |
| Tiglath-Pileser III | Layard 50a + 50b + 67a | 738–737 BCE | URU sa-me-ri-na-a-a | "city of Samaria" |
| Tiglath-Pileser III | Layard 66 | 732–731 BCE | URU Sa-me-ri-na | "city of Samaria" |
| Tiglath-Pileser III | III R 10,2 | 731 BCE | KUR E Hu-um-ri-a | "land of the House of Omri" |
| Tiglath-Pileser III | ND 4301 + 4305 | 730 BCE | KUR E Hu-um-ri-a | "land of the House of Omri" |
| Shalmaneser V | Babylonian Chronicle ABC1 | 725 BCE | URU Sa-ma/ba-ra-'-in | "city of Samaria" |
| Sargon II | Nimrud Prism, Great Summary Inscription | 720 BCE | URU Sa-me-ri-na | "city of Samaria" |
| Sargon II | Palace Door, Small Summary Inscription, Cylinder Inscription, Bull Inscription | 720 BCE | KUR Bit-Hu-um-ri-a | "land of Omri" |

== See also ==
- History of ancient Israel and Judah
  - Kingdom of Judah, the other Israelite kingdom
  - Kings of Israel and Judah
- Kingdom of Israel and Judah, claimed by the Hebrew Bible as Israel's (and Judah's) predecessor state
- Ten Lost Tribes, the Northern Kingdom's population that was lost after the Assyrian conquest in 720 BCE
- Samaritan people, the traditional descendants of the Northern Kingdom's non-deported Israelites
