= List of Jewish biblical figures =

This is a list of Jewish biblical figures.

== Hebrew Bible ==
- Aaron, brother of Moses and Miriam, and the first High Priest
- Abigail, a prophetess who became a wife of King David
- Abishai, one of King David's generals and relative
- Abner, cousin of King Saul and commander of his army, assassinated by Yoav
- Abraham, Isaac and Jacob, Judaism's "Three Patriarchs"
- Absalom, rebellious son of King David
- Al-Walid ibn Mus'ab
- Amram and Jochebed, both Levites, parents of Moses, Aaron, and Miriam
- Bathsheba, queen, wife of King David, and mother of King Solomon
- Boaz, husband of Ruth and ancestor of King David
- Daniel, prophet famous for surviving the lion's den
- Ezra, Nehemiah and Zerubbabel, prophets and leaders of the Babylonian captivity and Return to Zion
- Elijah and Elisha, important prophets who rebuked the kings of Israel
- Elkanah and Hannah, parents of the judge and prophet Samuel
- Esther and Mordechai, Persian queen, and her cousin, saviors of the Jews on Purim
- Gedaliah, last governor of Judea appointed by Babylonians, (assassinated)
- Gershom and Eliezer, Moses and Zipporah's sons
- Hananiah, Mishael, and Azariah (fellow exiles with and friends of Daniel) were thrown into a furnace by Nebuchadnezzar, yet survived "without the smell of smoke"
- Hosea, Joel, Amos, Obadiah, Jonah, Micah, Nahum, Habakkuk, Zephaniah, Haggai, Zechariah, Malachi, the Twelve Minor Prophets
- Isaiah, Jeremiah, Ezekiel, the Major Prophets
- Jeroboam, Nadab, Baasha, Elah, Zimri, Omri, Ahab, Ahaziah, Jehoram, Jehu, Jehoahaz, Jehoash, Jeroboam II, Zachariah, Shallum, Menahem, Pekahiah, Pekah, Hoshea, the kings of the northern Kingdom of Israel
- Jethro, a priest of Midian, Zipporah's father, and father-in-law of Moses, became a convert after Mt. Sinai
- Jonah, prophet during Kingdom of Israel
- Jonathan, son of King Saul and slain with him in battle, trusted friend of David
- Joshua, Othniel, Ehud, Shamgar, Deborah, Barak, Gideon, Abimelech, Tola, Jair, Jephthah, Ibzan, Elon, Abdon, Samson, and Eli, Samuel, the Judges who ruled after Moses and before the kings
- Saul, David, and Solomon, the kings who ruled the United Kingdom of Israel and Judah
- Leah, wife of Jacob
- Melchizedek King of Salem at the time of Abraham
- Miriam, prophetess, sister of Moses and Aaron
- Moses, adopted by Pharaoh's daughter in Egypt, leader of the Exodus from Egypt received the Torah or Law of Moses.
- Nathan, prophet in time of King David
- Neriah a prophet, and his son Baruch the scribe of Jeremiah
- Reuben, Simeon, Levi, Judah, Issachar, Zebulun, Gad, Asher, Dan, Naphtali, Joseph, Benjamin, the Twelve Tribes the Children of Israel, sons of Jacob called Israel. (Ephraim and Manasseh, Joseph's sons were also counted as part of the twelve tribes at times.)Dina is the 13th child of Jacob.
- Rachel, wife of Jacob
- Rebekah, wife of Isaac and mother of Esau and Jacob
- Rehoboam, Abijam, Asa, Jehoshaphat, Jehoram, Ahaziah, (Queen) Athaliah, Jehoash, Amaziah, Uzziah, Jotham, Ahaz, Hezekiah, Manasseh, Amon, Josiah, Jehoahaz, Jehoiakim, Jeconiah, Zedekiah, the kings of the southern Kingdom of Judah
- Ruth, Moabite convert and ancestor of King David
- Samuel, last of the Judges and first of the Prophets
- Sarah, Rebekah, Rachel, and Leah, Judaism's Four Matriarchs
- Tamar, daughter-in-law, and then levirate wife, of Judah
- Tamar, daughter of David, raped by Amnon
- Yoav, relative of King David, impulsive military leader
- Zilpah and Bilhah, additional wives of Jacob, mothers of four of the twelve Tribes
- Zipporah, Moses' wife, daughter of Jethro, a convert

== See also ==
- List of burial places of biblical figures
- List of Jews
