= The Thistle and the Cedar =

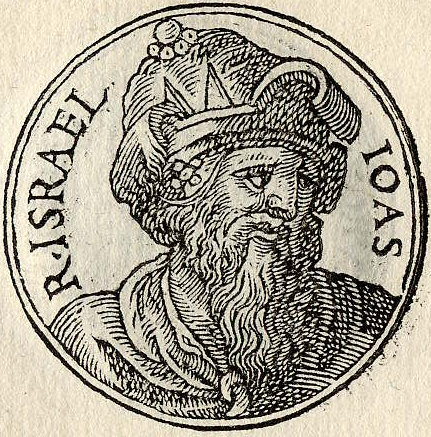
King Jehoash from Guillaume Rouillé's Promptuarii Iconum Insigniorum

The fable of the thistle and the cedar (or cypress) tree is a fable attributed to Jehoash King of Israel, and recounted in the Hebrew Bible in 2 Kings 14:9–10.

Amaziah sent messengers to Jehoash the son of Jehoahaz, the son of Jehu, king of Israel, saying, "Come, let us face one another in battle". And Jehoash king of Israel sent to Amaziah king of Judah, saying, "The thistle that was in Lebanon sent to the cedar that was in Lebanon, saying, 'Give your daughter to my son as wife'; and a wild beast that was in Lebanon passed by and trampled the thistle. You have indeed defeated Edom, and your heart has lifted you up. Glory in that, and stay at home; for why should you meddle with trouble so that you fall, you and Judah with you?" But Amaziah would not heed. Therefore Jehoash king of Israel went out; so he and Amaziah king of Judah faced one another at Beth Shemesh, which belongs to Judah. And Judah was defeated by Israel, and every man fled to his tent.

According to the Jewish historian Josephus, the reply to the challenge was given in a formal letter:

King Joash to King Amaziah [sends greeting]:
Once upon a time there was in Mount Lebanon a very tall cypress, and also there was a thistle. And the thistle sent to the cypress, saying, 'Contract thy daughter in marriage to my son'. And while this was transacting, a wild beast passed by and trod down the thistle. Let this be a warning to thee not to cherish immoderate desires, and not, because thou hast had success against Amalek, to pride thyself thereupon, and so draw down dangers both upon thee and upon thy kingdom.

Biblical commentator Andrew Fausset suggests that the thistle would be better described as a "thorn bush".
