= Zachary's =

Zachary's may refer to:

- Zachary's Chicago Pizza, a pizza restaurant chain in the San Francisco Bay Area
- Zachary's karate club, a social network of a university karate club
