= Joaddan =

Joaddan (Yehoadan, יהועדן) or Joaddin (Yehoadin, יהועדין) according to the Qere, is a female name of Hebrew origin and a person from the Hebrew Bible. She was the mother of Amaziah, the king of Judea.

== See also ==
- Joash of Judah

== Meaning ==
The name Joaddan means "God is bliss", but it can also be interpreted as "The Lord gives water to the earth".
