= Abakuasimbo =

- Town
- Location within Democratic Republic of the Congo
- Coordinates: 0°36′N 28°43′E
- Country: Democratic Republic of the Congo
- Province: Ituri Province
- Territory: Mambasa Territory
- Time zone: UTC+2 (CAT)

Abakuasimbo is a village in Ituri province near the border with North Kivu in eastern Democratic Republic of the Congo. It is connected by road to Mbunia in the southeast.
