= Zechariah (list of biblical figures) =

The male given name Zechariah is derived from the Hebrew זְכַרְיָה, meaning "The Lord has remembered." It has been translated into English in many variant forms and spellings, including Zachariah, Zacharias and Zachary.

It was the name of various men in the Bible.

== New Testament ==
- Zechariah (New Testament figure), the father of John the Baptist. In the King James version of the Bible and the Douay-Rheims Bible, his name was written Zacharias. He is recognized as a saint in both the Eastern Orthodox Church and the Roman Catholic Church. See also:
  - Islamic view of Zechariah, and
  - Benedictus (Song of Zechariah), his song (canticle) of thanksgiving.

== Hebrew Bible ==
Zechariah is the most common name in the Hebrew Bible.

- Zechariah (Hebrew prophet), a prophet of the kingdom of Judah, spelled this way in KJV.
  - His writings, the Book of Zechariah.
- Zechariah of Israel (Zachariah in KJV), king of Israel (reigned for 6 months in c. 752 BCE), son of Jeroboam
- Zechariah Ben Jehoiada, son of the High Priest in the times of Ahaziah and Joash. See also:
  - Tomb of Zechariah, a monument named after him in Jerusalem.

=== Minor characters ===
In addition to the characters named above, there are numerous minor characters in the Bible with the same name:

- A prophet, who had "understanding in the seeing of God," in the time of Uzziah, who was much indebted to him for his wise counsel: 2 Chron 26:5.
- One of the chiefs of the tribe of Reuben: 1 Chron 5:7.
- One of the porters of the tabernacle: 1 Chron 9:21.
- 1 Chron 9:37.
- A Levite who assisted at the bringing up of the ark from the house of Obed-edom: 1 Chron 15:20–24.
- A Kohathite Levite: 1 Chron 24:25.
- A Merarite Levite: 1 Chron 27:21.
- The father of Iddo: 1 Chron 27:21.
- One who assisted in teaching the law to the people in the time of Jehoshaphat: 2 Chron 17:7.
- A Levite of the sons of Asaph: 2 Chron 20:14.
- One of Jehoshaphat's sons: 2 Chron 21:2.
- The father of Abijah (queen), who was the mother of Hezekiah: 2 Chron 29:1 possibly the same as Isaiah's supporter Zechariah the son of Jeberechiah Isa 8:2.
- One of the sons of Asaph: 2 Chron 29:13.
- One of the "rulers of the house of God": 2 Chron 35:8.
- A chief of the people in the time of Ezra, who consulted him about the return from captivity in Ezra 8:16; probably the same as mentioned in Neh 8:4.
- Neh 11:12.
- Neh 12:16.
- Neh 12:35–41.

== See also ==
- Zacchaeus
