= Jeroboam II =

Israeli monarch

Jeroboam II יָרָבְעָם
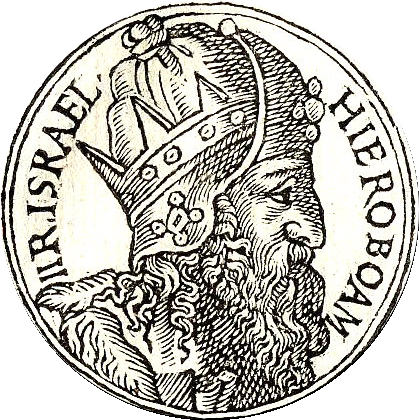
- Jeroboam II from Guillaume Rouillé's Promptuarium Iconum Insigniorum (1553)

King of Israel (Northern Kingdom)
- Reign: 41 years 793–753 BC or 786–746 BC
- Predecessor: Jehoash
- Successor: Zechariah
- Father: Jehoash

Jeroboam II (Hebrew: יָרָבְעָם, Yāroḇʿām; Greek: Ἱεροβοάμ; Latin: Hieroboam/Jeroboam), also referred to as Jeroboam son of Jehoash, was the successor of Jehoash (alternatively spelled Joash) and the thirteenth king of the ancient Kingdom of Israel, over which he ruled for forty-one years in the eighth century BC. His reign was contemporary with those of Amaziah and Uzziah, kings of Judah. Jeroboam is the fourth king of the House of Jehu and the longest-reigning king of the kingdom of Israel in Samaria. He is described as a military commander who fought Syria.

== History ==
William F. Albright has dated his reign to 786–746 BC, while Edwin R. Thiele says he was coregent with Jehoash 793 to 782 BC and sole ruler 782 to 753 BC.

He extended Israel to its former limits, from "the entering of Hamath to the sea of the plain".

In 1910, G. A. Reisner found 63 inscribed potsherds while excavating the royal palace at Samaria, which were later dated to the reign of Jeroboam II and mention regnal years extending from the ninth to the 17th of his reign. These ostraca, while unremarkable in themselves, contain valuable information about the script, language, religion and administrative system of the period. During the excavations at Megiddo in 1904, an 8th century BC Hebrew seal was found with the image of a roaring lion and the inscription "Belonging to Shema, servant of Jeroboam." In 2020, a number of scholars claimed to have authenticated an unprovenanced bulla belonging to the same official, but others hold that it is a forgery based on the Megiddo seal.

Archaeological evidence confirms the biblical account of his reign as the most prosperous that the northern kingdom of Israel had yet known. By the late 8th century BC, the territory of Israel was the most densely settled in the entire Levant, with a population of about 350,000. This prosperity was built on trade in olive oil, wine, and possibly horses, with Egypt and especially Assyria providing the markets. According to the prophet Amos, the triumphs of the king had engendered a haughty spirit of boastful overconfidence at home. Oppression and exploitation of the poor by the mighty, luxury in palaces of unheard-of splendor, and a craving for amusement were some of the internal fruits of these external triumphs. Archaeologist Israel Finkelstein has argued that many of the stories of King Solomon's rule over a large, prosperous kingdom were inspired by memories or records of the reign of Jeroboam II. For example, Finkelstein claimed that a list of districts in 1 Kings 4 supposedly under Solomonic rule actually matches the geographic boundaries of the Kingdom of Israel in the time of Jeroboam II. Thomas Römer has argued that Jeroboam I may not have existed and that Deuteronomistic redactors transferred the reign of Jeroboam II to Jeroboam I, although Lester L. Grabbe finds this theory unlikely.

Under Jeroboam II, the God of Israel was worshiped at Dan and Beth-el and at other old Israelite shrines, through actual images, such as the golden calf. These services at Dan and Beth-el, at Gilgal and Beer-sheba, were of a nature to arouse the indignation of the prophets, and the foreign cults, both numerous and degrading, contributed still further to arousing of the prophetic spirit. Jeroboam's reign was the period of the prophets Hosea, Joel, Amos and Jonah, all of whom condemned the materialism and selfishness of the Israelite elite of their day: "Woe unto those who lie upon beds of ivory ... eat lambs from the flock and calves ... [and] sing idle songs ..." The Book of Kings condemns Jeroboam for doing "evil in the eyes of the Lord", meaning both the oppression of the poor and his continuing support of the cult centres of Dan and Bethel, in opposition to the temple in Jerusalem. He was allowed to reign for 41 years because he protected the prophet Amos.

=== Earthquake in Israel c. 760 BC ===
A major earthquake had occurred in Israel c. 760 BC, which may have been during the time of Jeroboam II, towards the end of his rule. This earthquake is mentioned in the Book of Amos as having occurred during the rule of "Jeroboam son of Jehoash".

Geologists believe they have found evidence of this big earthquake in sites throughout Israel and Jordan. Archeologists Yigael Yadin and Israel Finkelstein dated the earthquake level at Tel Hazor to 760 BC based on stratigraphic analysis of the destruction debris. Similarly, David Ussishkin arrived at the same date based on the "sudden destruction" level at Lachish.

According to Steven A. Austin, the magnitude of this earthquake may have been at least 7.8, but more likely as high as 8.2. "This magnitude 8 event of 750 B.C. appears to be the largest yet documented on the Dead Sea transform fault zone during the last four millennia."

The epicenter of this earthquake may have been 200–300 km (120–190 mi) north of present-day Israel.

Multiple biblical references exist to this earthquake in the Book of Amos, and also in Zechariah 14:5.

Recent excavations by Aren Maeir in ancient Gath have revealed evidence of a major earthquake.

"Based on the tight stratigraphic context, this can be dated to the mid-8th cent. BCE" ...

== In the Bible ==
His name occurs in the Old Testament only in 2 Kings; 1 Chronicles; Book of Hosea; and Book of Amos. In all other passages it is Jeroboam I, the son of Nebat, that is meant.

== See also ==
- 2 Kings 14, 15
- Omrides, the previous dynasty
- Shema Seal
- List of biblical figures identified in extra-biblical sources

Jeroboam II House of Jehoshaphat; Contemporary Kings of Judah: Amaziah, Uzziah/Azariah
Regnal titles
Preceded by Jehoash	King of Israel; Coregent with Jehoash: 793–782 BCE; Sole reign: 782–753 BCE	Succeeded by Zachariah
