= Books of Kings =

Books of the Bible

The Book of Kings (Hebrew: סֵפֶר מְלָכִים, Sēfer Məlāḵīm) is a book in the Hebrew Bible, found as two books (1–2 Kings, sometimes called the books of 1 and 2 Kings or First Kings and Second Kings) in the Old Testament of the Christian Bible. It concludes the Deuteronomistic history, a history of ancient Israel also including the books of Joshua, Judges, and Samuel.

Biblical commentators believe the Books of Kings mixes legends, folktales, miracle stories and "fictional constructions" in with the annals for the purpose of providing a theological explanation for the destruction of the Kingdom of Judah by Babylon in c. 586 BC and to provide a foundation for a return from Babylonian exile. At the same time, the books are largely reliable for determining historical events. The two books of Kings present a history of ancient Israel and Judah, from the death of King David to the release of Jehoiachin from imprisonment in Babylon—a period of some 400 years (c. 960 – c. 560 BC). Scholars tend to treat the books as consisting of a first edition from the late 7th century BC and of a second and final edition from the mid-6th century BC.

== Contents ==
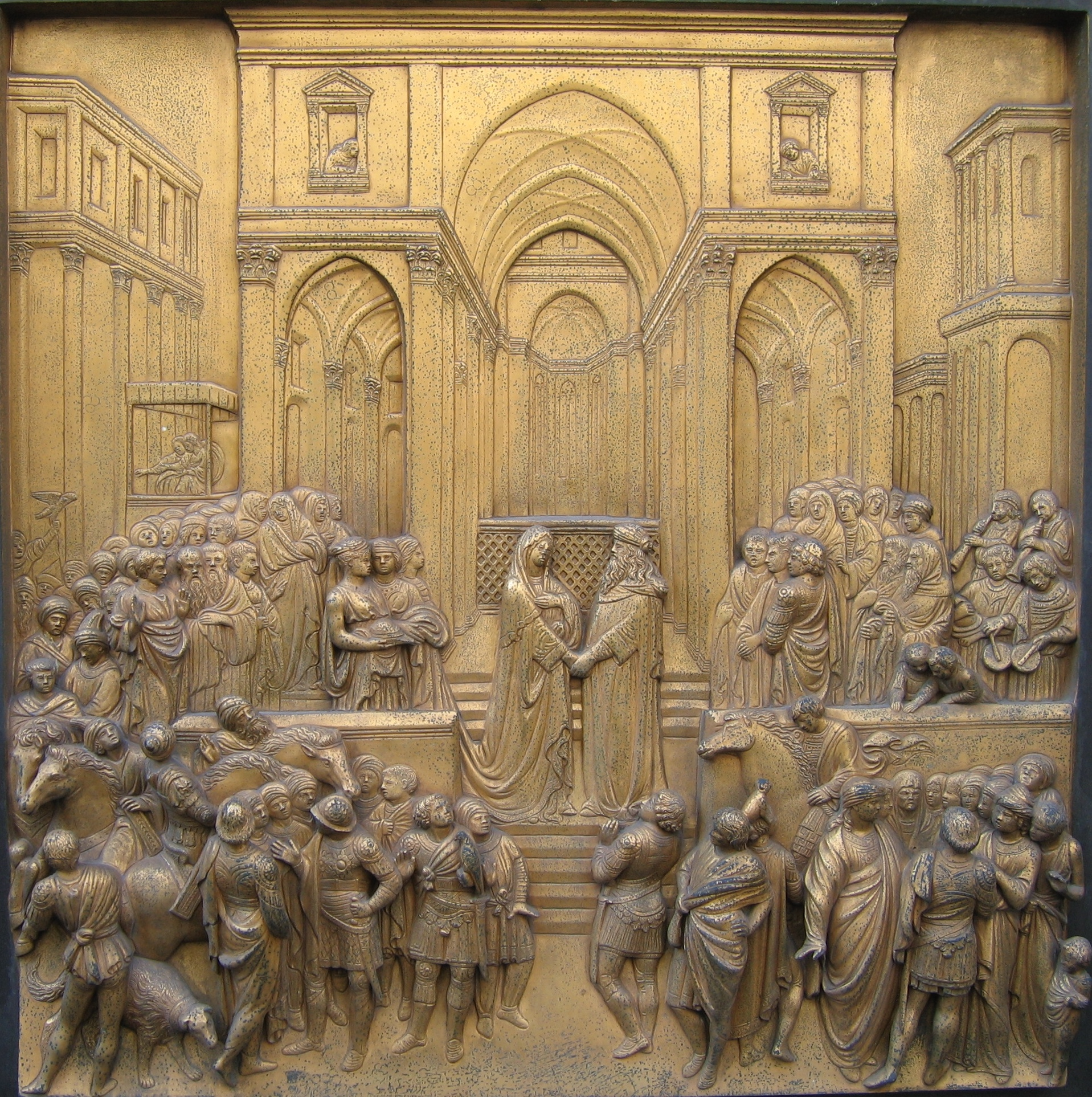
Solomon greeting the Queen of Sheba – gate of Florence Baptistry

The Jerusalem Bible divides the two Books of Kings into eight sections:

- 1 Kings 1:1–2:46. The Davidic succession
- 1 Kings 3:1–11:43. Solomon in all his glory
- 1 Kings 12:1–13:34. The political and religious schism
- 1 Kings 14:1–16:34. The two kingdoms until Elijah
- 1 Kings 17:1 – 2 Kings 1:18. The Elijah cycle
- 2 Kings 2:1–13:25. The Elisha cycle
- 2 Kings 14:1–17:41. The two kingdoms to the fall of Samaria
- 2 Kings 18:1–25:30. The last years of the kingdom of Judah

=== 1 Kings ===
==== The Davidic succession (1:1–2:46) ====
David is by now old, and so his attendants look for a virgin to look after him. They find Abishag, who looks after him but they do not have sexual relations. Adonijah, David's fourth son, born after Absalom, decides to claim the throne. With the support of Joab, David's general, and Abiathar, the priest, he begins a coronation procession. He begins the festivities by offering sacrifices at En Rogel in the presence of his brothers and the royal officials, but does not invite Nathan the prophet, Benaiah, captain of the king's bodyguard, or the bodyguard itself, or even his own brother Solomon.

Nathan comes to Bathsheba, Solomon's mother, and informs her what is going on. She goes to David and reminds him that he said Solomon would be his successor. As she is speaking to him, Nathan enters and explains the full situation to David. David reaffirms his promise that Solomon will be king after him and arranges for him to be anointed at the Gihon Spring. The anointing is performed by Zadok the priest. Following this, the population of Jerusalem proclaims Solomon king. This is heard by Adonijah and his fellow feasters, but they do not know what is happening until Abiathar's son Jonathan arrives and informs them. With Solomon officially enthroned, Adonijah fears for his life and claims sanctuary; Solomon decides to spare him unless he does something evil.

Shortly before his death, David advises his son on how to be a good king, and to punish David's enemies. Adonijah comes to Bathsheba and asks to marry Abishag. Solomon suspects this request is to strengthen Adonijah's claim to the throne and has Benaiah put him to death. He then takes away Abiathar's priesthood as punishment for supporting Adonijah, thus fulfilling the prophecy made to Eli at the start of 1 Samuel.

Joab hears what is going on and himself claims sanctuary, but when he refuses to come out of the tabernacle, Solomon instructs Benaiah to kill him there. He then replaces Joab with Benaiah and Abiathar with Zadok. Solomon then instructs Shimei ben Gera, the Benjaminite who cursed David as he was fleeing from Absalom, to move to Jerusalem and not to leave. One day, two of Shimei's slaves run away to Gath and Shimei pursues them. When he returns to Jerusalem, Solomon has him put to death for leaving Jerusalem.

==== Solomon in all his glory (3:1–11:43) ====
===== Solomon the sage (3:1–4:34) =====
Solomon makes an alliance with Egypt and marries the Pharaoh's daughter. After this, he continues the ancient practice of travelling between the high places and offering sacrifices. When he is at Gibeon, God speaks to him in a dream and offers him anything he asks for. Solomon, being young, asks for "an understanding heart to judge" (שָׁפַט). God is pleased and grants him not only "a wise...heart" (חכם), but also wealth, honor, and longevity, on the condition that Solomon is righteous like his father David. Solomon returns to Jerusalem and holds a feast for his servants in front of the Ark of the Covenant.

After the Judgment of Solomon amazes the Israelites, he appoints a cabinet and reorganizes the governance of Israel at a local level. The nation of Israel prospers and Solomon's provisions increase.

===== Solomon the builder (5:1–9:25) =====
Over a period of seven years, Solomon works to fulfill David's vow of building a temple to God with wood provided by the king of Tyre, Hiram I, an old friend of David's. He also builds himself a palace, which takes him thirteen years. Once the Temple is finished, Solomon hires a Tyrian half-Naphtalite named Huram to create the furnishings.

When finished, the things which David prepared for the Temple are brought in, and Solomon organizes a ceremony during which the priests carry the Ark of the Covenant into the Temple. A cloud fills the Temple, preventing the priests from continuing the ceremony. Solomon explains that this is the presence of God, and takes the opportunity to make a dedication speech. The dedication is completed with sacrifices, and a celebration is held for fourteen days. God speaks to Solomon and accepts his prayer, re-affirming his vow to David that his House will be kings forever unless they begin worshipping idols.

Solomon gives twenty towns in Galilee to Hiram as thanks for his help, but they are virtually worthless. He begins building and improvement works in various cities in addition to his major projects in Jerusalem and puts the remaining Canaanites into slavery.

===== Solomon the trader (9:26–10:29) =====
Solomon builds a navy.

The Queen of Sheba hears of Solomon's wisdom and travels to Jerusalem to meet him. Upon arriving, she praises him, saying she did not fully believe the stories about Solomon until she came to see him. The Queen gives Solomon 120 talents and a large amount of spices and precious stones, prompting Hiram to send a large amount of valuable wood and precious stones in response. Solomon also gives the Queen gifts and she returns to her country. Solomon by now has 666 talents of gold, and decides to forge shields and cups. He also maintains trading relations with Hiram, from whose country he receives many exotic goods. Overall, Israel becomes a net exporter of golden goods.

===== His decline (11:1–43) =====
Solomon amasses 700 wives and 300 concubines, many from foreign countries, including from countries God told the Israelites not to intermarry with. Solomon begins to adopt elements from their religions, and builds shrines in Jerusalem to foreign deities. God informs Solomon that because he has broken his commandments, the entire kingdom except one tribe will be taken away from his son.

At the same time, Solomon begins to amass enemies. A young prince named Hadad who managed to escape Joab's attempted genocide of the Edomites, hears Joab and David are dead, and returns to Edom to lead his people. Meanwhile, to the north, the Syrian king Rezon, whose Zobahite army was defeated by David, allies himself with Hadad and causes havoc for Israel from his base in Damascus.

On the home front, Jeroboam, who supervised the building of Solomon's palace terraces and the reconstruction of the city walls, encounters the prophet Ahijah the Shilonite on the road out of Jerusalem. Ahijah tears his cloak into twelve parts and gives ten of them to Jeroboam, saying that Jeroboam will rule over ten tribes of Israel upon Solomon's death as punishment for Solomon's idol worship. In response, Solomon tries to kill Jeroboam, but he flees to Egypt. Solomon dies after having reigned for forty years and is succeeded by his son Rehoboam.

==== The political and religious schism (12:1–13:34) ====
Rehoboam travels to Shechem to be proclaimed king. Upon hearing this, Jeroboam returns from Egypt and joins Rehoboam's older advisors in asking for the people to be treated better than under Solomon. Instead, Rehoboam turns to his friends for advice, and proclaims that he will treat the people worse. This greatly displeases the Israelites. When he sends a new minister of forced labour named Adoniram, they stone him to death. Rehoboam returns to safety in Jerusalem. The Israelites proclaim Jeroboam king. Judah remains loyal to Rehoboam, and he also controls Benjamin. From these two tribes, Rehoboam amasses an army to attack the north, but the prophet Shemaiah prevents the war.

Back in Shechem, Jeroboam becomes worried about the possible return of his tribes to loyalty to the House of David, and decides the best way to prevent this is to stop them worshipping the God of Israel, since he considers the point at which they are most likely to defect to be when they travel to Jerusalem to offer sacrifices. To this end, he sets up golden calves at altars at Bethel and Dan and appoints his own priests and festivals. One day, a prophet comes by and announces that some day a Davidic king named Josiah will be born and violently abolish Jeroboam's religion. Seeking to seize him, Jeroboam stretches out his hand, but it becomes withered and, as a sign, the altar splits open and its ashes pour out. Despite all this, Jeroboam does not change his ways. Later, the prophet is tested by a false prophet from Samaria and fails, dying in a lion attack as punishment. The Samarian prophet mourns his demise and requests to be buried next to him upon his own death.

==== The two kingdoms until Elijah (14:1–16:34) ====
Jeroboam's son Abijah becomes ill, so Jeroboam tells his wife to go in disguise to Ahijah, who has become blind with age. God tells Ahijah of the arrival of Jeroboam's wife. Ahijah prophesies the end of the House of Jeroboam, beginning with the death of Abijah, who will be the only member of the royal house to be buried. He prophesies that a usurper king will arise who will accomplish this. Jeroboam dies, and is succeeded by his son Nadab.

Meanwhile, in the Kingdom of Judah, the people set up high places, sacred stones and Asherah poles to foreign gods, and even allow male temple prostitution. The pharaoh Shishak sacks Jerusalem and takes all the royal and Temple treasures, including Solomon's gold shields, prompting Rehoboam to make bronze ones to replace them. Rehoboam dies and is succeeded by his son Abijah, a grandson of Absalom. Abijah is as bad as his father, but God continues to protect him and his family because of the promise He made to David. When Abijah dies, he is succeeded by his son Asa.

Asa, in contrast to his father and grandfather, is a good king, on par with David. He abolishes male temple prostitution and destroys idols, and even deposed his grandmother as Queen mother due to idolatry. He moves a collection of gold and silver objects back into the Temple. However, when he goes to war against Baasha of Israel, he gives the royal and Temple gold and silver to Ben-Hadad, king of Aram, to get him to break a treaty with Israel and attack with him. Ben-Hadad is surprisingly successful, and Baasha must withdraw from Ramah, leading Asa to issue a decree that Ramah's fortifications be taken down and used to build Geba and Mizpah. Asa dies an old man and is succeeded by his son Jehoshaphat.

Back in Israel, Nadab is on the throne. Like his father, he is evil. Baasha, son of an Issacharite named Ahijah, plots to kill him and succeeds in a sneak attack, taking him by surprise during the Siege of Gibbethon, a Philistine city. He then proceeds to kill Jeroboam's whole family, fulfilling the prophecy of Ahijah the prophet. However, Baasha commits the same sins as Jeroboam. God therefore informs the prophet Jehu that he will also end the House of Baasha. Baasha dies and is succeeded by his son Elah, who soon falls victim to a plot led by his charioteer Zimri. Zimri becomes king after Elah's killing, and fulfills the prophecy of Jehu; however, Zimri's army now proclaims its commander Omri as king and returns to Tirzah to lay siege to it. Seeing he is losing, Zimri sets fire to the palace.

The start of Omri's reign faces factionalism, with half his subjects supporting Tibni, son of Gibnath as king. He buys the hill of Shemer, upon which he builds the city of Samaria. However, he is the worst king yet. When he dies, he is succeeded by his son Ahab, who himself overtakes Omri in his evilness. Upon his marriage to Jezebel, daughter of Ethbaal, king of Sidon, he introduces the worship of Baal, building him a temple and setting up an Asherah pole. Meanwhile, a nobleman named Hiel of Bethel activates the curse proclaimed by Joshua by rebuilding Jericho, resulting in the death of his oldest and youngest sons.

==== The Elijah cycle (17:1–22:54) ====
===== The great drought (17:1–18:46) =====
A new prophet arises in Israel, named Elijah, who informs Ahab of a years-long drought about to begin. God then tells Elijah to hide in the Kerith Ravine, where he drinks from the stream and is fed by ravens. When the brook dries up, God tells Elijah to travel to Zarephath, where a widow will feed him. She is more than happy to give him water, but when he asks for bread, she informs him that she is just about to make a small loaf – only enough that she and her son may eat it as their last meal. Elijah instructs her to make him some anyway, telling her that she will not run out of food until the famine is over. Soon, the widow's son becomes ill and dies. At the widow's insistence, Elijah raises him from the dead.

Three years later, God tells Elijah to return to Ahab because the drought is coming to an end. On the way, Elijah meets his administrator Obadiah, who was hiding prophets during Jezebel's persecutions, and asks him to tell Ahab of his arrival. Seeking to end the worship of Baal for good, Elijah tells Ahab to invite four hundred priests of Baal and four hundred of Asherah to the top of Mount Carmel. There, he upbraids the people for their duplicity, telling them to choose either worship of the God of Israel or of Baal.

He then proposes a challenge: he and the priests will each prepare a sacrifice, and then call upon their respective gods to send fire to burn it. When the priests attempt to call down fire, none comes. On the other hand, despite having the Israelites pour much water over his altar, when Elijah prays for fire God sends it, accepting the sacrifice. Elijah orders the priests of Baal be killed, and informs Ahab of the coming rain. Climbing to the top of the mountain, Elijah sends his servant to look out to sea. After returning seven times, the servant eventually sees a small cloud rising far out at sea. Elijah tells the servant to inform Ahab to return to Jezreel in his chariot, while Elijah manages to run ahead of him.

===== Elijah at Horeb (19:1–21) =====
When she hears what has happened, Jezebel threatens to kill Elijah, causing him to run for his life. In the wilderness near Beersheba, Elijah, fed up, asks God to kill him. Instead, an angel supplies him with food, which gives him the strength to continue a further forty days until he reaches Mount Horeb, where he falls asleep in a cave. When Elijah wakes up, God tells him He is about to pass by. An earthquake occurs and a fire starts, but neither contain God.

Instead, God appears in the form of a whisper. After hearing Elijah's concerns about being killed, he instructs him to go to Damascus, where he is to anoint Hazael as king of Aram, Jehu as king of Israel and Elisha as Elijah's own successor. Elijah finds Elisha plowing with oxen. Elisha says goodbye to his parents, kills his oxen and cooks them by burning his plowing equipment. He distributes the meat to his neighbours and sets off to follow Elijah.

===== The Aramean wars (20:1–43) =====
Ben-Hadad II, the new king of Aram, raises an army and sends messengers demanding all Ahab's gold and silver, and the best of his wives and children. While agreeing to this demand, after consulting his advisors he decides not to accept a follow-up demand requesting anything else of value in his palace or his officials' houses. In response to this situation, Ben-Hadad attacks Samaria. At this point, Ahab receives a prophecy that his junior officers will defeat Ben-Hadad if Ahab starts the battle. Ben-Hadad tells his men to take the advancing troops alive, but each junior officer kills his Aramean equivalent.

The Arameans, including Ben-Hadad, begin a retreat, but Ahab's army inflicts heavy losses. The prophet who brought the first prophecy tells Ahab to improve his defences, since the Arameans will attack again. Ben-Hadad's advisors reason that the reason they lost was because God lives in the hills, leading them to attack Aphek, a city on the plains, the following spring. In response to this, God agrees to give the Israelites another victory to demonstrate his omnipresence. After a disastrous first day, Ben-Hadad sends messengers to Ahab, begging him to spare him. Ahab sends for Ben-Hadad, who offers to return the land his father took from Israel. The two kings sign a treaty and Ben-Hadad leaves.

After failing to get another prophet to strike him with his weapon, resulting in that prophet's death by lion, a prophet manages to get someone else to do it and appears before Ahab, telling him a parable about how his failing to guard a man in battle means he now must pay a talent. When he removes his headband, and Ahab sees he is a prophet, he tells Ahab that he will die because he spared Ben-Hadad, who God had told him to kill.

===== Naboth's vineyard (21:1–28) =====
Some time later, Ahab attempts to buy a vineyard belonging to Naboth the Jezreelite. When Naboth will not sell it to him on account of it being his inheritance, Ahab sulks and refuses to eat. Jezebel proclaims a day of fasting, upon which two false witnesses accuse Naboth of cursing God and the king. He is stoned to death, allowing Ahab to take possession of the vineyard. In response, God tells Elijah to confront Ahab and inform him that he will die in the vineyard and that his descendants and Jezebel will be wiped out. This has marked the peak of Ahab's evilness, and indeed the evilness of any king of Israel. Ahab repents, so God allows the disaster Elijah prophesied to come during the reign of his son instead.

===== Another war with Aram (22:1–38) =====
Three years pass with peace between Aram and Israel. Aram still possesses Ramoth-Gilead and, when Jehoshaphat agrees for the Judahite army to accompany him on a campaign during a state visit, Ahab decides to take it back. Four hundred prophets agree this is a good idea, but Jehoshaphat asks to speak with a prophet of God. Ahab reluctantly calls Micaiah, whom he dislikes for never prophesying in his favour. When he arrives, a prophet named Zedekiah uses a strange hat with horns to claim that Ahab will have victory over the Arameans.

Michaiah tells Ahab that if he attacks Ramoth-Gilead, he will die and Israel will be leaderless but that this is part of God's plan. Zedekiah slaps him, leading Michaiah to prophesy impending destruction, and Ahab tells his jailer to put Michaiah in prison with no food or water until Ahab returns safely.

Ahab and Jehoshaphat begin their campaign, agreeing that Ahab will be disguised while Jehoshaphat will wear his royal robes. The Arameans, being under instructions to kill no one except Ahab, begin pursuing Jehoshaphat but cease their pursuit when they see he is not Ahab. Ahab is hit between the plates of his armour by a random Aramean arrow. He withdraws from the battle and dies that evening. He is buried, his chariot is washed in a pool where prostitutes bathe, and his blood is licked by dogs.

===== After the death of Ahab (22:39–53) =====
Ahab's son Ahaziah succeeds him.

Jehoshaphat has been a good king his entire reign, following the example of his father Asa. He has not destroyed the high places, but he has kept peace with Israel. He has also gotten rid of the remaining male temple prostitutes and there is now a provincial governor rather than a king in Edom. He has built a merchant navy, but it was wrecked at Ezion-Geber. Ahaziah suggests they join forces in this regard, but Jehoshaphat refuses. Jehoshaphat dies and is succeeded by his son Jehoram.

Ahaziah does evil and allows the idol worship which flourished under his father to continue.

=== 2 Kings ===
==== The Elijah cycle (continued) (1:1–18) ====
===== After the death of Ahab (continued) (1:1–18) =====
Ahaziah falls through a lattice on an upper floor and injures himself. He sends a party to Ekron to consult its god, Baal-Zebub, about whether he will recover. The messengers are met by Elijah, who tells them to inform Ahaziah that he will die where he is for seeking advice from a non-Israelite god. Ahaziah sends two captains and fifty men each to summon Elijah, but both parties are consumed by fire at Elijah's command. When Ahaziah sends a third group, God tells Elijah to go with them and deliver his prophecy directly. Ahaziah dies and, having no sons, his brother Joram succeeds him.

==== The Elisha cycle (2:1–13:25) ====
===== Its opening (2:1–25) =====
Elijah and Elisha are walking from Gilgal. Elijah asks that Elisha stay where they are, but Elisha insists on coming with him to Bethel. Elijah informs him that he is going to be taken by God. Elisha seems to have some kind of knowledge of this. Once again, Elijah asks Elisha to stay where they are, but Elisha insists on coming with him to Jericho. Eventually, they reach the Jordan, where fifty prophets are. Elijah strikes the water with his cloak, the water divides, and the pair cross over. Elijah asks what Elisha wants when he is gone, and Elisha asks for a double portion of his spirit, which Elijah says will be given to him if he watches him go.

Suddenly, a fiery horse-drawn chariot takes Elijah and he ascends to heaven in a whirlwind. After mourning, Elisha picks up Elijah's cloak and himself uses it to part the Jordan. This leads the other prophets to recognise him as Elijah's successor, and offer to look for Elijah, an offer which Elisha refuses. They persist but, naturally, are unable to find him. As Elisha's first task, he throws salt into a spring in Jericho, resolving the locals' water problem by purifying the water. When Elisha leaves for Bethel, some boys start jeering him on account of his baldness. Bears come and maul them.

===== The Moabite war (3:1–27) =====
Joram is evil but gets rid of the sacred stone of Baal. After the death of Ahab, the king of Moab refused to continue paying tribute to Israel, so Joram teams up with Jehoshaphat and the king of Edom to put down the rebellion. They attack through the Desert of Edom but soon run out of water. They ask Elisha for advice. He first makes it very clear that he is only doing this for Jehoshaphat's sake and then calls for a harpist. Elisha prophesies a coming flood in the valley in addition to a complete defeat of Moab.

The water comes but looks like blood to the Moabites, which they conclude can only have come from the three kings having killed each other. However, when they cross, Israel wins a great victory and completely plunders the land. When the king of Moab sacrifices his firstborn son on the city walls, the Israelites are overwhelmed by great wrath and withdraw.

===== Some miracles of Elisha (4:1–6:7) =====
Elisha meets a widow whose creditors are threatening to take her two sons into slavery as payment. When he finds out the only other thing she has is a small jar of olive oil, he tells her to go and ask all her neighbours for jars. He tells her to pour oil into the jars, and it holds out until every jar is filled. Elisha finally tells her to sell the oil, pay the creditors and live off the rest. He then moves on to Shunem, where a woman invites him to eat and soon decides to build a room for use whenever he passes through.

His servant Gehazi informs him that she has no son, so Elisha tells her that she will have a child within a year, as payment for her kindness. One day, the child is helping his father's reapers when he complains of a pain in his head. He is returned to his mother and dies. His mother therefore seeks out Elisha, whom she meets at Mount Carmel. He tells Gehazi to quickly make his way to the house and lay his staff on the boy's face. When Elisha gets there with the woman, Gehazi informs him that this has not worked.

Elisha prays, paces, and lays himself on the boy, who then awakens. Elisha continues on to Gilgal, where a famine is raging. Seeking to help the local prophets, he tells his servant to cook a stew. One of the prophets inadvertently adds some poisonous berries to the pot, but Elisha adds some flour, negating the poison. A man comes from Baal-Shalish with twenty loaves of bread. Elisha uses them to miraculously feed the hundred people present.

An Aramean general named Naaman has leprosy. He hears of Elisha from an Israelite slave-girl and receives permission from the king to travel in an attempt to have his leprosy cured. He travels first to the king of Israel, but is eventually called by Elisha, who sends a messenger to tell him to wash seven times in the Jordan. He does what Elisha told him to and his leprosy is cured. Naaman offers Elisha a gift of thanks, but Elisha refuses. Naaman contents himself with taking earth back to Damascus in order to build an altar to God and asking God's forgiveness for when he has to participate in Aramean religious rituals when accompanying the king. As Naaman is leaving Gehazi catches up with him and lies about prophets arriving so that at least he can get a gift. As punishment for this, Elisha curses him to become leprous.

Several other prophets begin complaining that their meeting place with Elisha is too small, so he agrees to allow them to build a new one on the banks of the Jordan. During the building, someone's borrowed axehead falls in the river but miraculously floats.

===== The Aramean wars (6:8–8:29) =====
By this point, Aram is back at war with Israel. Elisha warns the king of Israel where the Arameans are camped several times, frustrating the king of Aram, who seeks him out. One morning, Elisha wakes up to find Dothan, the city where he is staying, surrounded by Arameans. His servant is frightened, until Elisha shows him the angels protecting them. He then prays that the Aramean army go blind, and they do. He then leads them to Samaria, where their eyes are opened.

The king of Israel asks Elisha whether he should kill them, but Elisha instead tells him to treat them with hospitality. This ends the war, but soon Ben-Hadad is back at war and laying siege to Samaria. The resulting famine gets so severe that soon people resort to cannibalism. The king feels the best way to deal with the situation is to execute Elisha, blaming God for the famine. Elisha prophesies that huge amounts of the finest flour and barley will soon come to Samaria, but that the king's official will not taste any of it.

Four lepers sit at the gate of Samaria and decide to surrender to the Arameans in the hope of not dying in the famine. God made the Arameans hear horses and chariots the night before and, thinking the Hittites and Egyptians were helping the Israelites, they fled. The lepers find the abandoned camp and tell the king. The Samaritans then go and plunder the camp, driving down the price of food in the city. In the chaos, the king's official who was with him when he went to see Elisha is trampled to death.

Elisha has warned the Shunammite woman about the famine, so she and her husband have gone to live in Philisitia. Upon return, she goes to the king to appeal for her land back. When she arrives, Gehazi is telling the king about how Elisha raised her son from the dead. This works in her favour, and her house and land are restored to her, as well as all her income. Next, Elisha goes to Damascus, where Ben-Hadad is ill. When he hears of Elisha's arrival, Ben-Hadad sends Hazael to him with a gift to ask whether he will get better. Elisha tells Hazael to tell the king that he will, even though he will in fact die, and Hazael will become king and cause much damage to Israel. The next day, Hazael smothers the king and succeeds him.

Back in Judah, Jehoram is king. Unlike his father and grandfather, he is evil and follows the ways of Israel, even marrying a daughter of Ahab. However, he is not destroyed, again because of God's covenant with David. His reign is plagued with instability, including revolts in Edom, who restores its monarchy, and Libnah. Jehoram dies and is succeeded by his son Ahaziah, who, like his father, follows in Ahab's footsteps. Ahaziah and Joram go to war together against Hazael. Joram is wounded, and after the battle Ahaziah goes to Jezreel to see him.

===== The history of Jehu (9:1–10:36) =====
Elisha tells a prophet to go to Ramoth-Gilead and anoint a commander of the royal guard named Jehu as king. Jehu leads his troops to Jezreel to challenge Joram. Joram sends two messengers, but both join Jehu. Jehu accuses Joram of continuing the idolatry of Jezebel. Joram flees, warning Ahaziah, but is struck in his heart between his shoulders and dies. Jehu tells his charioteer Bidkar to place him in Naboth's field. Jehu wants to kill Ahaziah too, but merely succeeds in wounding him, although he dies from his injuries at Megiddo.

His body is taken back to Jerusalem for burial. As Jehu enters Jezreel, Jezebel looks out of a window and compares him to Zimri. Two eunuchs push her out of a window at Jehu's behest and she dies. When two servants later go to prepare her body for burial as a king's daughter, they find nothing but some bones. She has been eaten by dogs, in accordance with Elijah's prophecy.

Jehu writes to Samaria, challenging the palace officials to pick Ahab's strongest son, put him on the throne and have him challenge Jehu. They refuse, and so Jehu instead asks for the heads of Ahab's seventy sons. After he has had them put inside the city gate of Jezreel, Jehu massacres the remaining members of the House of Ahab in order to fulfil Elijah's prophecy. Jehu then sets off for Samaria. On the way, he meets some of Ahaziah's relatives and has them killed too. Further along, he meets Jehonadab, who becomes his ally.

Upon finally reaching Samaria, he kills the rest of Ahab's family. Under the guise of preparing a sacrifice for Baal, he next summons all the priests of Baal. After the sacrifice is over, he has guards enter the temple and kill them. He destroys the sacred stone and tears down the temple, replacing it with a toilet, thus ending the worship of Baal. However, he does not destroy the golden calves at Bethel and Dan, which was Jeroboam's original sin. Nonetheless, God is pleased with his destruction of the Baal religion, and promises that his House will reign in Israel for four generations. However, Jehu is not meticulous in his worship of God, so God allows Hazael to conquer large portions of Israel. Jehu dies and is succeeded by his son Jehoahaz.

===== From the reign of Athaliah to the death of Elisha (11:1–13:25) =====
Athaliah, the mother of Ahaziah, seizes the throne after the death of her son and begins killing off members of the royal family. Ahaziah's sister, Jehosheba, manages to hide her nephew Joash. Seven years later, Jehosheba's husband, the priest Jehoiada, introduces Joash to the army, and informs all five units that they will now be required to guard the Temple on the Sabbath in order to protect Joash. He also gives them all the spears and shields from David's day that are kept in the Temple. Joash is crowned and anointed, and proclaimed king by the army. Athaliah claims treason, but Jehoiada has her taken back to the palace and killed. Next, the altars of Baal are destroyed, thus ending the religion in Judah as well. Finally, Joash is taken back to the palace and enthroned.

Joash is a good king, but does not remove the high places. When he grows up, his first act is to reform priestly pay, and use whatever is left to repair the Temple. Twenty-three years later, when the Temple is still not repaired, Joash once again reforms priestly pay so that all money from the Temple treasury goes towards repairs. Instead, the priests will earn money from offerings. This succeeds, and the Temple is repaired. Hazael is back at war with Israel, and it looks like he will cross the border and attack Jerusalem, so Joash sends him gifts and he leaves. Joash is assassinated and is succeeded by his son Amaziah.

Jehoahaz is evil, so God allows Hazael to continue oppressing Israel. He repents, so God allows the war to end. However, Jehoahaz does not get rid of Jeroboam's religion, or remove the Asherah pole in Samaria. In addition, the war has almost completely eradicated the Israelite army. Jehoahaz dies and is succeeded by his son Jehoash, who continues the evil of the previous kings of Israel. He goes to war with Amaziah. The key event of Jehoash's reign, is the death of Elisha. When Jehoash goes to see him, he tells him to shoot an arrow out of the east window, and prophesies that, based on this, the Arameans will be defeated at Aphek.

He then tells him to throw arrows at the floor. Jehoash throws three, which Elisha is angry about, since it means there will only be three victories there. He then dies and is buried. During a Moabite raid, some Israelite men burying a dead body panic and throw the body in Elisha's tomb. As soon as it touches Elisha's bones, the dead body returns to life. Hazael's wars have plagued Israel since the reign of Jehoahaz, but God does not destroy Israel because of the Abrahamic and Israelite covenants. Hazael dies and is succeeded by his son Ben-Hadad III. As prophesied, Jehoash defeats him three times, taking back the towns Hazael conquered.

==== The two kingdoms to the fall of Samaria (14:1–17:41) ====
Amaziah is a good king, but the high places have still not been abolished. Upon assumption of the throne, he executes his father's assassins, but spares their children in accordance with the Mosaic law. Amaziah defeats the Edomites and challenges Israel, but Jehoash advises him to stay at home. The pair meet at Beth Shemesh and Israel thoroughly defeats Judah, scattering Amaziah's troops and allowing Jehoash to sack Jerusalem. Jehoash dies and is succeeded by his son Jeroboam II. Amaziah faces a conspiracy and is killed in Lachish. He is buried in Jerusalem and succeeded by his son Azariah, who recovers and rebuilds Elath.

Jeroboam II is evil. He restores Israelite territory from Lebo-Hamath to the Dead Sea, in accordance with a prophecy by Jonah. This is because God has promised not to destroy Israel and has seen how much the Israelites are suffering. He dies and is succeeded by his son Zechariah.

Azariah is a good king, although the high places still exist. He is, however, a leper, and so is relieved of his responsibilities while his son Jotham acts as regent. Azariah dies and Jotham succeeds him.

Zechariah is evil, and falls victim of a conspiracy by Shallum, who assassinates and succeeds him, thus fulfilling God's promise to Jehu that his family would rule for four generations. Shallum is himself assassinated and succeeded by Menahem, who attacks Tiphsah, sacks it and rips open its pregnant women. During Menahem's reign, Pul of Assyria (also called Tiglath-Pileser) attacks Israel.

Menahem raises taxes to pay Pul both to leave and to support him on the throne. Menahem dies and is succeeded by his son Pekahiah, who is assassinated by his official Pekah and fifty mercenaries from Gilead. During Pekah's reign, Pul comes back and captures many towns in northern Israel, including all of the land belonging to the Tribe of Naphtali, and deports their populations to Assyria. Pekah is assassinated by Hoshea, who succeeds him as king.

Jotham is a good king, but, again, the high places are still being used. He rebuilds the Upper Gate of the Temple. Aram and Israel attack Judah during his reign. He dies and is succeeded by his son Ahaz. Ahaz is a bad king, even going so far as to sacrifice his son. Rezin, king of Aram, retakes Elath and gives it to Edom during the ongoing attacks. In an attempt to resolve the situation, Ahaz writes to Pul for help, which he gives by capturing Damascus, deporting its citizens and killing Rezin. Ahaz travels to Damascus to meet Pul, and while there sends a sketch of a new altar back to Jerusalem, which is built before he returns. He places it in the Temple upon his arrival. To symbolise his deference to the king of Assyria, he then removes much of the decoration in the Temple. He dies and is succeeded by his son Hezekiah.

Hoshea is evil, but not as bad as the preceding kings of Israel. During Hoshea's reign, Shalmaneser of Assyria attacks Israel in response to Israel's maintaining diplomatic relations with Egypt and refusing to pay tribute to Assyria. Shalmaneser conquers Samaria and deports its citizens to Media. All this happens because Israel has broken the commandments, principally by worshipping other gods and ignoring the prophets. This leaves only Judah, and even they are guilty of following the religious practices introduced by Israel. The king of Assyria then sends his subjects to resettle Samaria, led by an Israelite priest, whose job is to teach them the rites God requires. While they take this on board, they nonetheless continue worshipping their own national gods.

==== The last years of the Kingdom of Judah (18:1–25:30) ====
===== Hezekiah, the prophet Isaiah; Assyria (18:1–20:21) =====
Hezekiah, the 13th king of Judah, does "what [is] right in the Lord's sight just as his ancestor David had done". He institutes a far-reaching religious reform: centralising sacrifice at the temple in Jerusalem, and destroying the images of other gods, including the Nehushtan, the bronze snake Moses erected in the wilderness, which the Israelites have turned into an idol. He breaks his alliance with the Assyrians and defeats the Philistines. Following the capture of Samaria, the Assyrians attack Judah, but withdraw in return for money. The Assyrians soon attack again, and send a threatening and blasphemous message to Hezekiah, supposing that he has sought an alliance with Egypt.

The Assyrian commander then attempts to turn the Judahites against Hezekiah, claiming that he is powerless to protect him, but Hezekiah pre-empts and stops this from happening. When Hezekiah hears the message, he sends a delegation to the prophet Isaiah, who tells them that God will save Jerusalem and the kingdom from Assyria. When Sennacherib, king of Assyria, hears of the advance of Tirhakah, king of Cush, he retreats, but warns of a coming invasion. Hezekiah prays, and Isaiah sends another prophecy of Assyria's destruction. God sends an angel to kill the Assyrians, and the remaining Assyrians retreat in horror. Sennacherib is killed by his sons and is succeeded by a third son.

Hezekiah becomes ill, and Isaiah tells him he will die. Hezekiah prays, and God agrees to give him fifteen more years if he goes to the temple in three days. Isaiah prescribes a poultice of figs, and Hezekiah recovers. When Hezekiah goes to the Temple and stands on the steps of Ahaz, his shadow moves back ten steps, thus proving God's words to be true. The king of Babylon sends an embassy to Hezekiah, who shows them everything in the palace. Isaiah prophesies that one day the Babylonians will carry away everything in the palace. However, there is peace for the rest of Hezekiah's reign. Hezekiah builds an aqueduct consisting of a pool and a tunnel before he dies. He is succeeded by his son Manasseh.

===== Two wicked kings (21:1–26) =====
Manasseh reverses his father's reforms, murders the innocent, and sets up altars in the Temple. This breaches the Davidic-Solomonic covenant, and so God announces that he will destroy Jerusalem because of this apostasy by the king. He is succeeded by his son Amon. Amon follows in his father's footsteps, and is eventually assassinated by his officials. The assassins are executed, and Amon is succeeded by his son Josiah.

===== Josiah and the religious reform (22:1–23:30) =====
Josiah begins his reign with a rebuilding of the Temple. During this effort, Hilkiah, the high priest, finds a copy of the Book of Deuteronomy and has Shaphan, the royal secretary, read it to the king. When Josiah hears the laws which have been broken, he becomes sorrowful and sends a delegation to the prophetess Huldah to ask what to do. Huldah tells the delegation that God will destroy Jerusalem, but not until after Josiah has died.

Josiah plans a ceremony to renew the Mosaic covenant. First, he reads to the people from the scroll and has them all renew the covenant. Then, he has Hilkiah remove all the objects dedicated to other gods from the Temple, burn them in the Kidron Valley and take the ashes to Bethel. Finally, he fires the priests of the other gods, desecrates the high places and gets rid of the male shrine prostitutes and weavers of Asherah in the temple.

While he is at Bethel, in the midst of destroying the tombs there, he finds the tomb of the prophet who prophesied his coming and spares it along with that of the Samarian prophet who had then tested him. He then instructs his people to celebrate Passover, since its celebration had fallen out of use for many years. He gets rid of the mediums and spiritists. He is the best king in the history of Israel and Judah. Josiah goes to battle against Necho II of Egypt and the king of Assyria, but is defeated and killed by Necho at Megiddo.

===== The destruction of Jerusalem (23:31–25:30) =====
Necho takes Josiah's successor, Jehoahaz, captive and imposes huge demands on Judah. He places another of Josiah's sons, Jehoiakim, on the throne, who pays the demands by increasing taxes. Both of Josiah's successors are evil.

Nebuchadnezzar II of Babylon invades, and Jehoiakim becomes his vassal for three years until he rebels. In response to this, in order to fulfil what God had said with regards to Manasseh, a large number of raiders from neighbouring kingdoms and empires attack Judah. This time, there is no support from Egypt because it has already been invaded by the Babylonians. Jehoiakim dies and is succeeded by his son Jehoiachin, who is also evil. Nebuchadnezzar lays siege to Jerusalem, and the Judahites surrender.

Nebuchadnezzar takes Jehoiachin and his family hostage, and takes away everything from the Temple and the palace, fulfilling Isaiah's prophecy to Hezekiah. He then takes away everyone into exile except the very poorest people. He then puts Jehoiachin's uncle, Zedekiah, on the throne. Zedekiah is also evil. Eventually, he rebels against Nebuchadnezzar and Jerusalem is put under siege for two years. Finally, famine overcomes the city and the walls are broken through. Zedekiah's punishment, which he serves at Riblah, is to watch his sons being killed before having his eyes gouged out and being carried as prisoner to Babylon.

Nebuchadnezzar burns down Jerusalem, including the Temple, the palace and all the important buildings. The walls are broken down, and everyone left is carried off, except some of the poorest people to act as farmers. He also kills the remaining priests at Riblah. He appoints Gedaliah as provincial governor. However, he is eventually killed by the last remaining member of the royal family, Ishmael son of Nethaniah, and a large number of Judahites and Babylonians flee to Egypt. Awel-Murduk becomes king of Babylon on Nebuchadnezzar's death. He releases Jehoiachin, gives him a place at his table and an allowance, and places him higher in honour than all other kings in Babylon other than himself.

== Composition ==
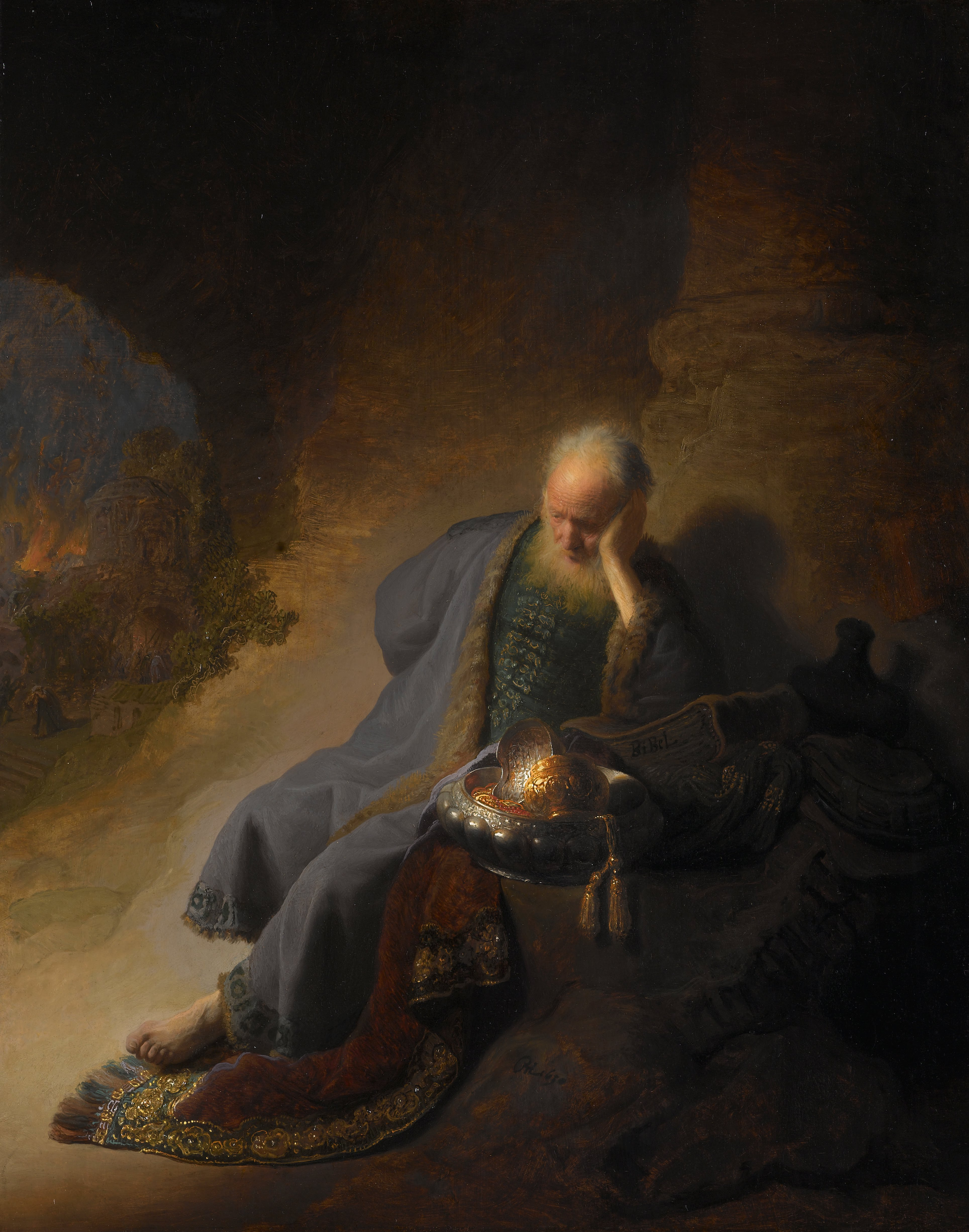
Rembrandt, Jeremiah Lamenting the Destruction of Jerusalem, c. 1630.

=== Textual history ===
In the Hebrew Bible, First and Second Kings are a single book, as are the First and Second Books of Samuel. When this was translated into Greek in the last few centuries BC, Samuel was joined with Kings in a four-part work called the Book of Kingdoms. Orthodox Christians continue to use the Greek translation (the Septuagint), but when a Latin translation (called the Vulgate) was made for the Western church, Kingdoms was first retitled "The Book of Kings, parts One to Four", and eventually both Samuel and Kings were separated into two books each.

Thus, the books now commonly known as 1 Samuel and 2 Samuel are known in the Vulgate as 1 Kings and 2 Kings (in imitation of the Septuagint). What are now commonly known as 1 Kings and 2 Kings would be 3 Kings and 4 Kings in old Bibles before the year 1516, such as in the Vulgate and the Septuagint. The division known today, used by Protestant Bibles and adopted by Catholics, came into use in 1517. Some Bibles—for example, the Douay Rheims Bible—still preserve the old denomination.

=== Deuteronomistic history ===
According to Jewish tradition the author of Kings was Jeremiah, who would have been alive during the fall of Jerusalem in 586 BC. The most common view today accepts Martin Noth's thesis that Kings concludes a unified series of books which reflect the language and theology of the Book of Deuteronomy, and which biblical scholars therefore call the Deuteronomistic history.

Noth argued that the History was the work of a single individual living in the 6th century BC, but scholars today tend to treat it as made up of at least two layers, a first edition from the time of Josiah (late 7th century BC), promoting Josiah's religious reforms and the need for repentance, and (2) a second and final edition from the mid-6th century BC. Further levels of editing have also been proposed, including: a late 8th century BC edition pointing to Hezekiah of Judah as the model for kingship; an earlier 8th-century BC version with a similar message but identifying Jehu of Israel as the ideal king; and an even earlier version promoting the House of David as the key to national well-being.

=== Sources ===
The editors/authors of the Deuteronomistic history cite a number of sources, including (for example) a "Book of the Acts of Solomon" and, frequently, the "Annals of the Kings of Judah" and a separate book, "Chronicles of the Kings of Israel". The "Deuteronomic" perspective (that of the book of Deuteronomy) is particularly evident in prayers and speeches spoken by key figures at major transition points: Solomon's speech at the dedication of the Temple is a key example. The sources have been heavily edited to meet the Deuteronomistic agenda, but in the broadest sense they appear to have been:

- For the rest of Solomon's reign the text names its source as "the book of the acts of Solomon", but other sources were employed, and much was added by the redactor.
- Israel and Judah: The two "chronicles" of Israel and Judah provided the chronological framework, but few details, apart from the succession of monarchs and the account of how the Temple of Solomon was progressively stripped as true religion declined. A third source, or set of sources, were cycles of stories about various prophets (Elijah and Elisha, Isaiah, Ahijah and Micaiah), plus a few smaller miscellaneous traditions. The conclusion of the book (2 Kings 25:18–21, 27–30) was probably based on personal knowledge.
- A few sections were editorial additions not based on sources. These include various predictions of the downfall of the northern kingdom, the equivalent prediction of the downfall of Judah following the reign of Manasseh, the extension of Josiah's reforms in accordance with the laws of Deuteronomy, and the revision of the narrative from Jeremiah concerning Judah's last days.

=== Manuscript sources ===
Three of the Dead Sea Scrolls feature parts of Kings: 5QKgs, found in Qumran Cave 5, contains parts of 1 Kings 1; 6QpapKgs, found in Qumran Cave 6, contains 94 fragments from all over the two books; and 4QKgs, found in Qumran Cave 4, contains parts of 1 Kings 7–8. The earliest complete surviving copy of the book(s) of Kings is in the Aleppo Codex (10th century CE).

== Themes and genre ==
The kings of Israel and Judah

Kings is "history-like" rather than history in the modern sense, mixing legends, folktales, miracle stories and "fictional constructions" in with the annals, and its primary explanation for all that happens is God's offended sense of what is right; it is therefore more fruitful to read it as theological literature in the form of history. Kings judges each king of Israel on the basis of whether he recognises the authority of the Temple in Jerusalem (none do, and therefore all are "evil"), and each king of Judah on the basis of whether he destroys the "high places" (rivals to the Temple in Jerusalem); it gives only passing mention to important and successful kings like Omri and Jeroboam II and ignores one of the most significant events in ancient Israel's history, the battle of Qarqar. Still, Kings is "history like", as it provides a chronology, contains coordination between its different parts, and is "a fairly reliable source for historical evidence".

The major themes of Kings are God's promise, the recurrent apostasy of the kings, and the judgement this brings on Israel:

- Promise: In return for Israel's promise to worship Yahweh alone, Yahweh makes promises to David and to Israel – to David, the promise that his line will rule Israel forever, to Israel, the promise of the land they will possess.
- Apostasy: the great tragedy of Israel's history, meaning the destruction of the kingdom and the Temple, is due to the failure of the people, but more especially the kings, to worship Yahweh alone (Yahweh being the God of Israel).
- Judgement: Apostasy leads to judgement. Judgement is not punishment, but simply the natural (or rather, God-ordained) consequence of Israel's failure to worship Yahweh alone.

Another and related theme is that of prophecy. The main point of the prophetic stories is that God's prophecies are always fulfilled, so that any not yet fulfilled will be so in the future. The implication, the release of Jehoiachin and his restoration to a place of honour in Babylon in the closing scenes of the book, is that the promise of an eternal Davidic dynasty is still in effect, and that the Davidic line will be restored.

== Textual features ==
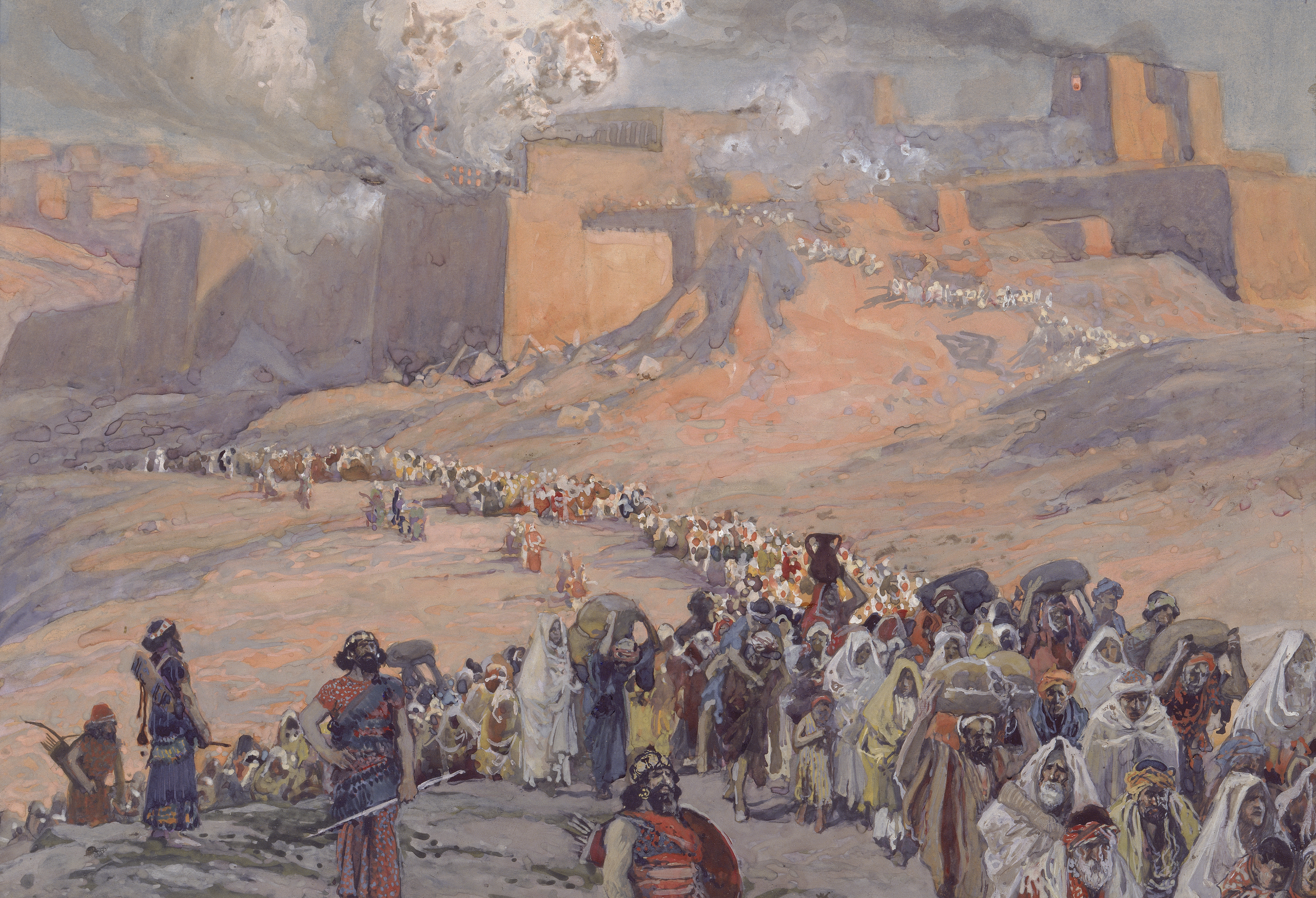
James Tissot, The Flight of the Prisoners – the fall of Jerusalem, 586 BC

=== Chronology ===
The standard Hebrew text of Kings presents an impossible chronology. To take just a single example, Omri's accession to the throne of the Kingdom of Israel is dated to the 31st year of Asa of Judah meanwhile the ascension of his predecessor, Zimri, who reigned for only a week, is dated to the 27th year of Asa. The Greek text corrects the impossibilities but does not seem to represent an earlier version. A large number of scholars have claimed to solve the difficulties, but the results differ, sometimes widely, and none has achieved consensus status.

=== Kings and 2 Chronicles ===
The second Book of Chronicles covers much the same time-period as the books of Kings, but it ignores the northern Kingdom of Israel almost completely, David is given a major role in planning the Temple, Hezekiah is given a much more far-reaching program of reform, and Manasseh of Judah is given an opportunity to repent of his sins, apparently to account for his long reign. It is usually assumed that the author of Chronicles used Kings as a source and emphasised different areas as he would have liked it to have been interpreted.

== See also ==
- Historicity of the Bible
- Kingdom of Israel (united monarchy)
- Kings of Israel and Judah

== Bibliography ==
=== Commentaries on Kings ===
- Fretheim, Terence E (1997). First and Second Kings. Westminster John Knox Press. ISBN 978-0-664-25565-7.
- Nelson, Richard Donald (1987). First and Second Kings. Westminster John Knox Press. ISBN 978-0-664-22084-6.
- Sweeney, Marvin (2007). I & II Kings: A Commentary. Westminster John Knox Press. ISBN 978-0-664-22084-6.

=== General ===
- Knight, Douglas A (1995). "Deuteronomy and the Deuteronomists". In Mays, James Luther; Petersen, David L.; Richards, Kent Harold (eds.). Old Testament Interpretation. T&T Clark. ISBN 978-0-567-29289-6.
- Knight, Douglas A (1991). "Sources". In Mills, Watson E.; Bullard, Roger Aubrey (eds.). Mercer Dictionary of the Bible. Mercer University Press. ISBN 978-0-86554-373-7.
- Leuchter, Mark; Adam, Klaus-Peter (2010). "Introduction". In Leuchter, Mark; Adam, Klaus-Peter; Adam, Karl-Peter (eds.). Soundings in Kings: Perspectives and Methods in Contemporary Scholarship. Fortress Press. ISBN 978-1-4514-1263-5.
- Moore, Megan Bishop; Kelle, Brad E (2011). Biblical History and Israel's Past: The Changing Study of the Bible and History. Eerdmans. ISBN 978-0-8028-6260-0.
- McKenzie, Steven L (1994). "The Books of Kings". In McKenzie, Steven L.; Patrick Graham, Matt (eds.). The History of Israel's Traditions: The Heritage of Martin Noth. Sheffield Academic Press. ISBN 978-0-567-23035-5.
- Perdue, Leo G (2001). "Preface: The Hebrew Bible in Current Research". In Perdue, Leo G. (ed.). The Blackwell Companion to the Hebrew Bible. Blackwell. ISBN 978-0-631-21071-9.
- Spieckermann, Hermann (2001). "The Deuteronomistic History". In Perdue, Leo G. (ed.). The Blackwell Companion to the Hebrew Bible. Blackwell. ISBN 978-0-631-21071-9.
- Sutherland, Ray (1991). "Kings, Books of, First and Second". In Mills, Watson E.; Bullard, Roger Aubrey (eds.). Mercer Dictionary of the Bible. Mercer University Press. ISBN 978-0-86554-373-7.
- Tomes, Roger (2003). "1 and 2 Kings". In Dunn, James D.G.; Rogerson, John William (eds.). Eerdmans Commentary on the Bible. Eerdmans. ISBN 978-0-8028-3711-0.
- Van Seters, John (1997). In search of history: historiography in the ancient world and the origins of biblical history. Eisenbrauns. ISBN 978-1-57506-013-2.
- Walton, John H. (2009). "The Deuteronomistic History". In Hill, Andrew E.; Walton, John H. (eds.). A Survey of the Old Testament. Zondervan. ISBN 978-0-310-22903-2.
- Wilson, Robert R (1995). "The Former Prophets: Reading the Books of Kings". In Mays, James Luther; Petersen, David L.; Harold Richards, Kent (eds.). Old Testament Interpretation: Past, Present and Future: Essays in honor of Gene M. Tucker. Continuum International. ISBN 978-0-567-29289-6.

Books of Kings History books
Preceded by Samuel	Hebrew Bible	Succeeded by Isaiah
Preceded by Samuel	Christian; Old Testament	Succeeded by 1–2 Chronicles
