= Jehoash of Israel =

Twelfth king of the ancient Kingdom of Israel

Jehoash יְהוֹאָשׁ
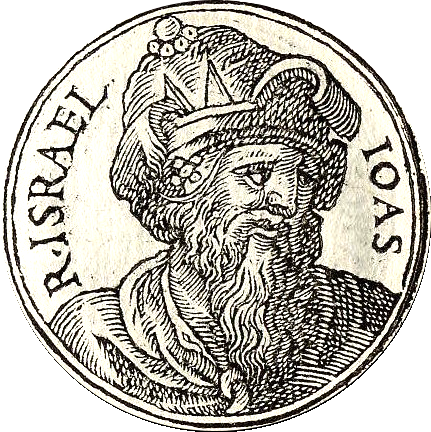
- Jehoash from Guillaume Rouillé's; Promptuarii Iconum Insigniorum

King of Israel (Northern Kingdom)
- Reign: 16 years c. 798 – c. 782 BC
- Predecessor: Jehoahaz
- Successor: Jeroboam II
- House: House of Jehu
- Father: Jehoahaz

Jehoash (Hebrew: יְהוֹאָשׁ Yəhō’āš or יוֹאָשׁ Yō’āš; Israelian Hebrew: 𐤀𐤔𐤉𐤅 *’Āšīyāw; Akkadian: 𒅀𒀪𒋢 Yaʾsu [ia-'-su]; Latin: Ioas; fl. c. 790 BC) was the twelfth king of the ancient northern Kingdom of Israel (Samaria) and the son of Jehoahaz. He was the 12th king of Israel and reigned for 16 years. When he ascended the throne, the Kingdom of Israel was suffering from the predations of Aram-Damascus, whose king Hazael was conquering land controlled by Samaria.

William F. Albright dated his reign to 801–786 BC, while Edwin R. Thiele offered the dates 798–782 BC.

== Biblical account of his reign ==
According to the second book of Kings, Jehoash was sinful and did evil in the eyes of Yahweh for tolerating the worship of the golden calves, yet outwardly at least he worshiped Yahweh. He reigned as king of Israel for 16 years and led the Israelites through some decisive battles, including a war with the kingdom of Judah.

=== Death of Elisha ===
Joash Shooting the Arrow of Deliverance by William Dyce, 1844

According to 2 Kings 13:14, Jehoash went to visit the prophet Elisha, who was sick with the illness that would eventually lead to his death. He held the prophet Elisha in honor, and wept by his bedside while he was dying. Jehoash pleased Elisha, addressing him in the words Elisha himself had used when Elijah was carried up into heaven: "Father, father! Israel’s chariots and riders!"

When Jehoash failed to obey Elisha's instructions completely, Elisha predicted that Jehoash would only defeat Aram-Damascus three times rather than five or six times, which may have been enough to end the Syrian threat. In three signal and successive victories, Jehoash overcame the Syrians and retook towns Hazael had captured.

=== War with Judah ===
Later in his reign, Jehoash led the men of the Kingdom of Israel in the defeat of king Amaziah of Judah. Amaziah had begun to worship some of the idols he had taken from the Edomites, which the author of Chronicles believes led to his ruin and his defeat by Jehoash, whom he had challenged to battle.

Jehoash had warned Amaziah, saying:

A thistle in Lebanon sent a message to a cedar in Lebanon, 'Give your daughter to my son in marriage.' Then a wild beast in Lebanon came along and trampled the thistle underfoot. You have indeed defeated Edom and now you are arrogant. Glory in your victory, but stay at home! Why ask for trouble and cause your own downfall and that of Judah also?

Jehoash utterly defeated Amaziah at Beth-shemesh, on the borders of Dan and Philistia. Jehoash then advanced on Jerusalem, broke down a portion of the wall, and carried away the treasures of the Temple and the palace. Jehoash took Amaziah as a prisoner. Amaziah's defeat was followed by a conspiracy that took his life. Jehoash also took hostages to assure good conduct.

After the battle he soon died and was buried in Samaria.

== Archaeology ==
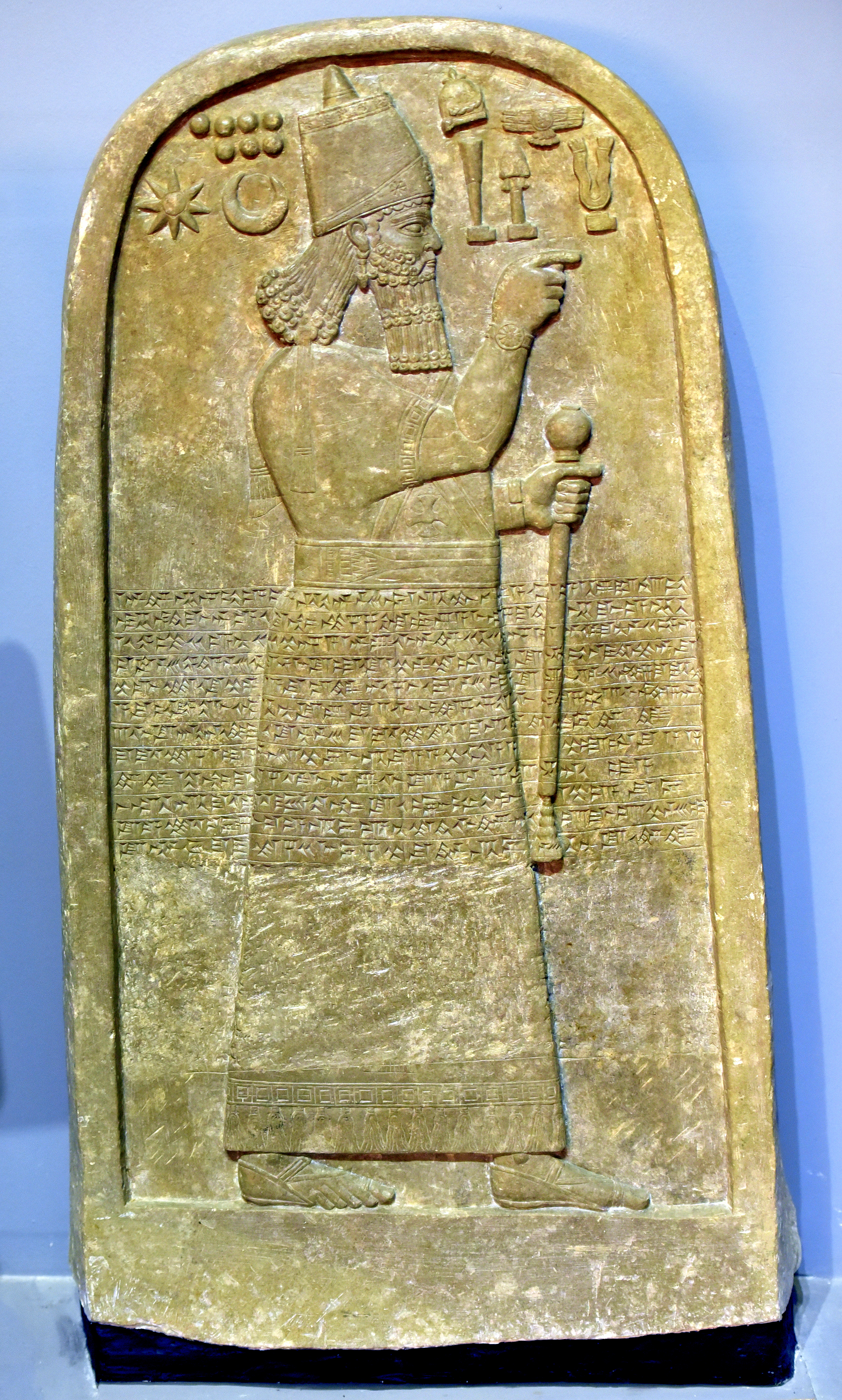
Stele of Adad-nirari III from Tell al-Rimah, now in the Iraq Museum, mentions the name of Jehoash the Samarian

The excavation at Tell al-Rimah yields a stele of Adad-nirari III which mentioned "Jehoash the Samarian" and contains the first cuneiform mention of Samaria by that name.

A postulated image of Jehoash is reconstructed from plaster remains recovered at Kuntillet Ajrud. The ruins were from a temple built by the northern Israel kingdom when Jehoash of Israel gained control over the kingdom of Judah during the reign of Amaziah of Judah.

== See also ==
- List of biblical figures identified in extra-biblical sources

Jehoash of Israel House of Jehoshaphat; Contemporary Kings of Judah: Jehoash/Joash, Amaziah, Uzziah
Regnal titles
Preceded by Jehoahaz	King of Israel; 798–782 BCE	Succeeded by Jeroboam II
