= Jehoahaz of Israel =

Jehoahaz יְהוֹאָחָז
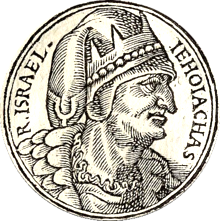
- Jehoahaz from Guillaume Rouillé's; Promptuarii Iconum Insigniorum

King of Israel (Northern Kingdom)
- Reign: 17 years c. 814 – c. 798 BC
- Predecessor: Jehu
- Successor: Jehoash
- Father: Jehu

Jehoahaz of Israel (Hebrew: יְהוֹאָחָז Yəhō’āḥāz, meaning "Yahweh has held"; Latin: Joachaz) was the eleventh king of Israel and the son of Jehu (2 Kings 10:35; 13:1). He reigned for seventeen years.

== History ==
William F. Albright dated his reign to 815–801 BC, while E. R. Thiele offered the dates 814–798 BC.

== Biblical narrative ==
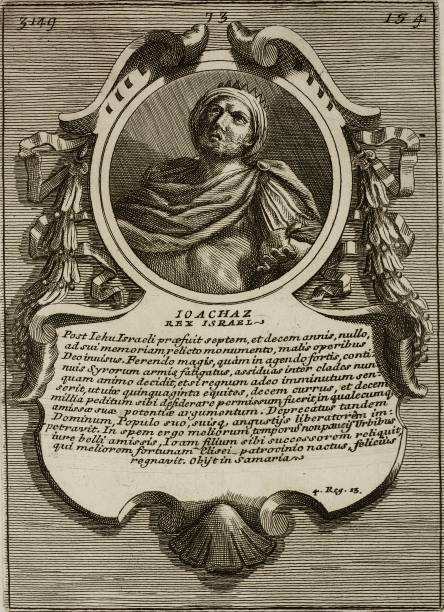
Engraving of Jehoahaz (Bartolomeo Gai, 1751)

The account in 2 Kings states that he did evil in the sight of Yahweh, and his people followed the religious practices of the house of Jeroboam, which included the worship of a cultic pole of Asherah in Samaria. The kings of the Arameans, Hazael and Ben-hadad, prevailed over him (2 Kings 13:1–3). Jehoahaz besought the Lord for a deliverer to relieve Israel from Aramean oppression, and He provided a savior for Israel, who is not named. The Arameans were defeated, but this left Jehoahaz with an army reduced to 50 horsemen, 10 chariots and 10,000 foot soldiers.

== Identity of the deliverer ==
2 Kings 13:25 suggests that Jehoahaz's son Joash, who recaptured a number of Israelite cities in three successful battles, could have been the deliverer referred to in 2 Kings 13:5, and the Geneva Study Bible maintains this view, but the Jerusalem Bible and the Cambridge Bible for Schools and Colleges argue that Jeroboam II, Joash's son, was the deliverer, citing 2 Kings 14:27:

The Lord ... saved them by the hand of Jeroboam the son of Joash

The Pulpit Commentary agrees that this was "probably" the case.

Adad-nirari III, King of Assyria, (812–783 BC) also made campaigns into the west (804–797 BC), and on one of these incursions captured and sacked the city of Damascus, thus removing the worst enemy of Israel's prosperity, and so he could also be considered the "deliverer".

Jehoahaz of Israel House of Jehoshaphat; Contemporary King of Judah: Jehoash/Joash
Regnal titles
Preceded by Jehu	King of Israel; 814–798 BCE	Succeeded by Joash/Jehoash
