= Uzziah =

10th king of Judah

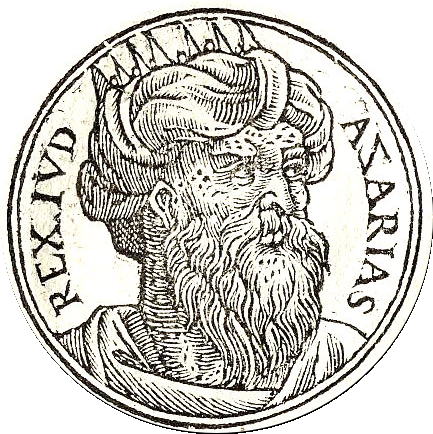
- Uzziah from Guillaume Rouillé's Promptuarii Iconum Insigniorum, 1553

King of Judah
- Reign: 52 years 791–750 BC (Thiele); 783–742 BC (Albright)
- Predecessor: Amaziah
- Successor: Jotham
- Spouse: Jerusha
- House: House of David
- Father: Amaziah
- Mother: Jecoliah

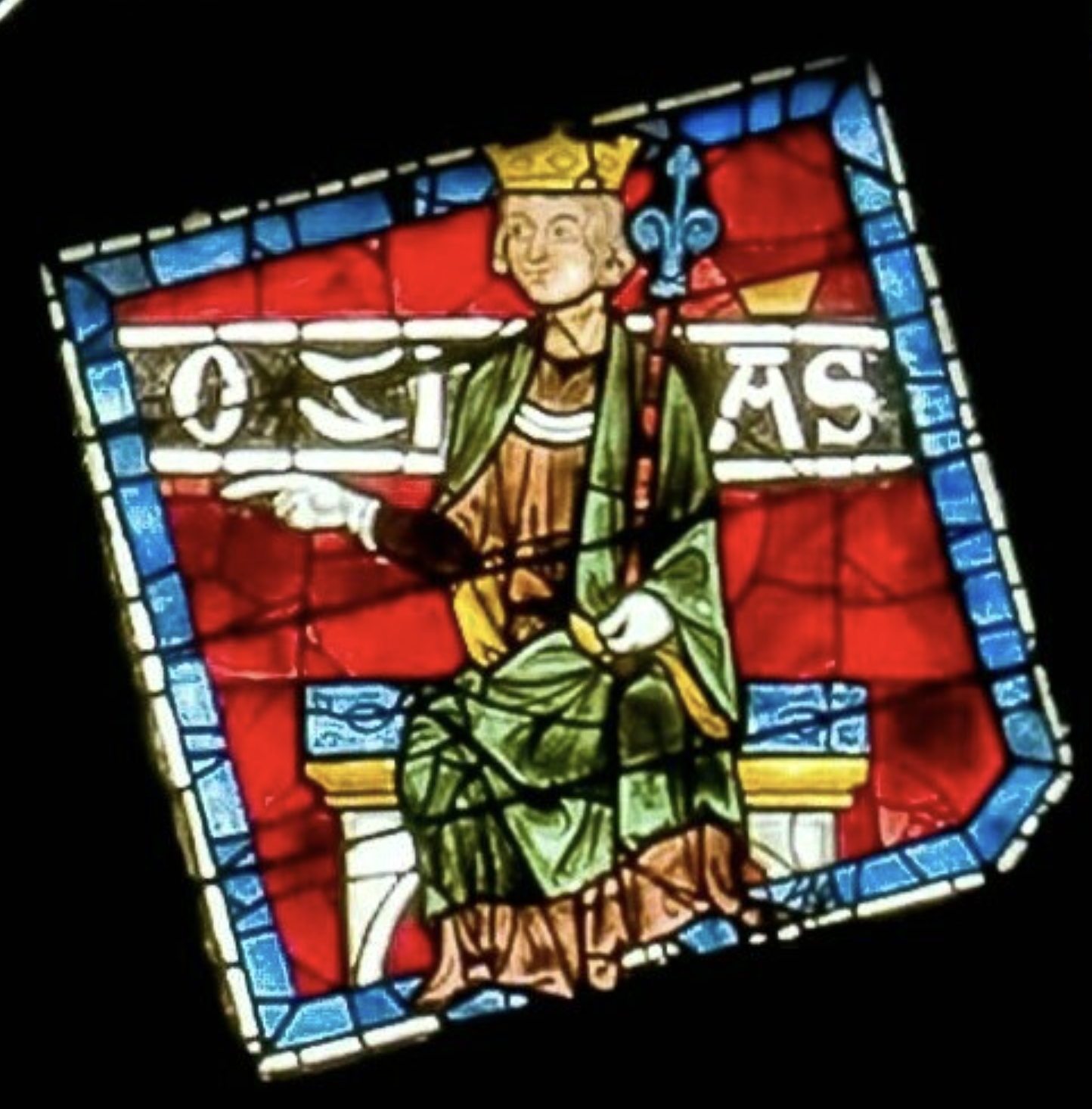
King Uzziah of Judah, from the north rose window of Chartres Cathedral

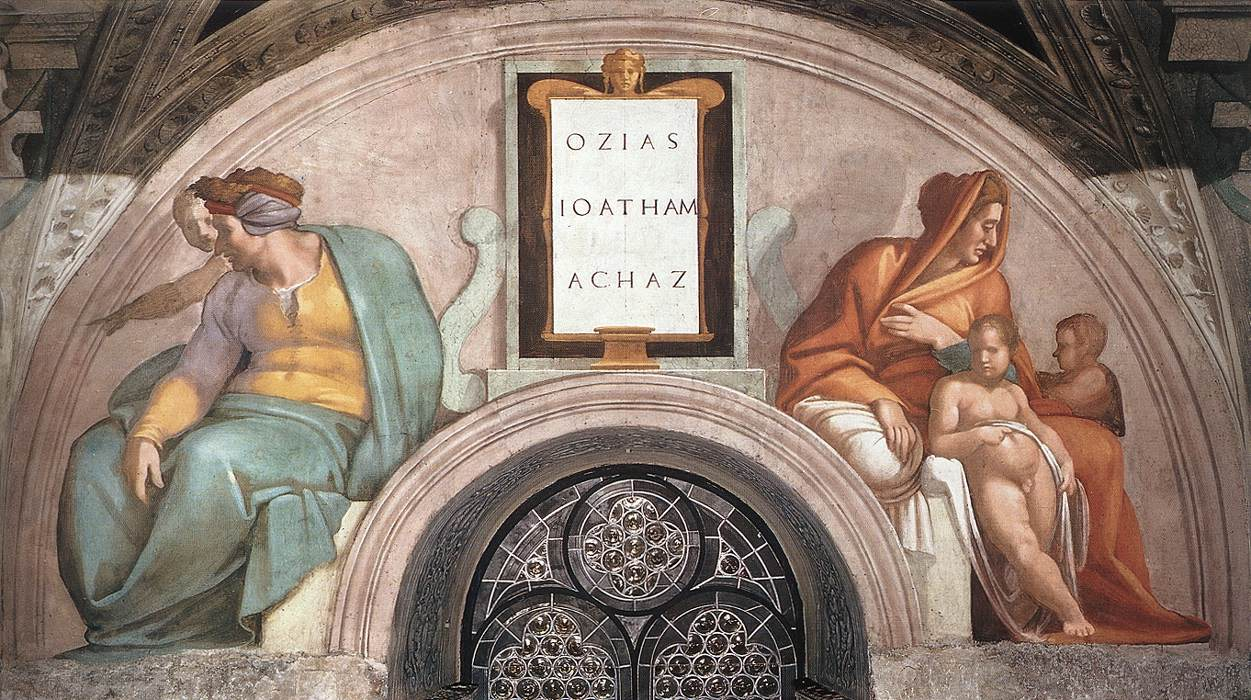
Uzziah, Jotham, and Ahaz, from the Sistine Chapel ceiling.

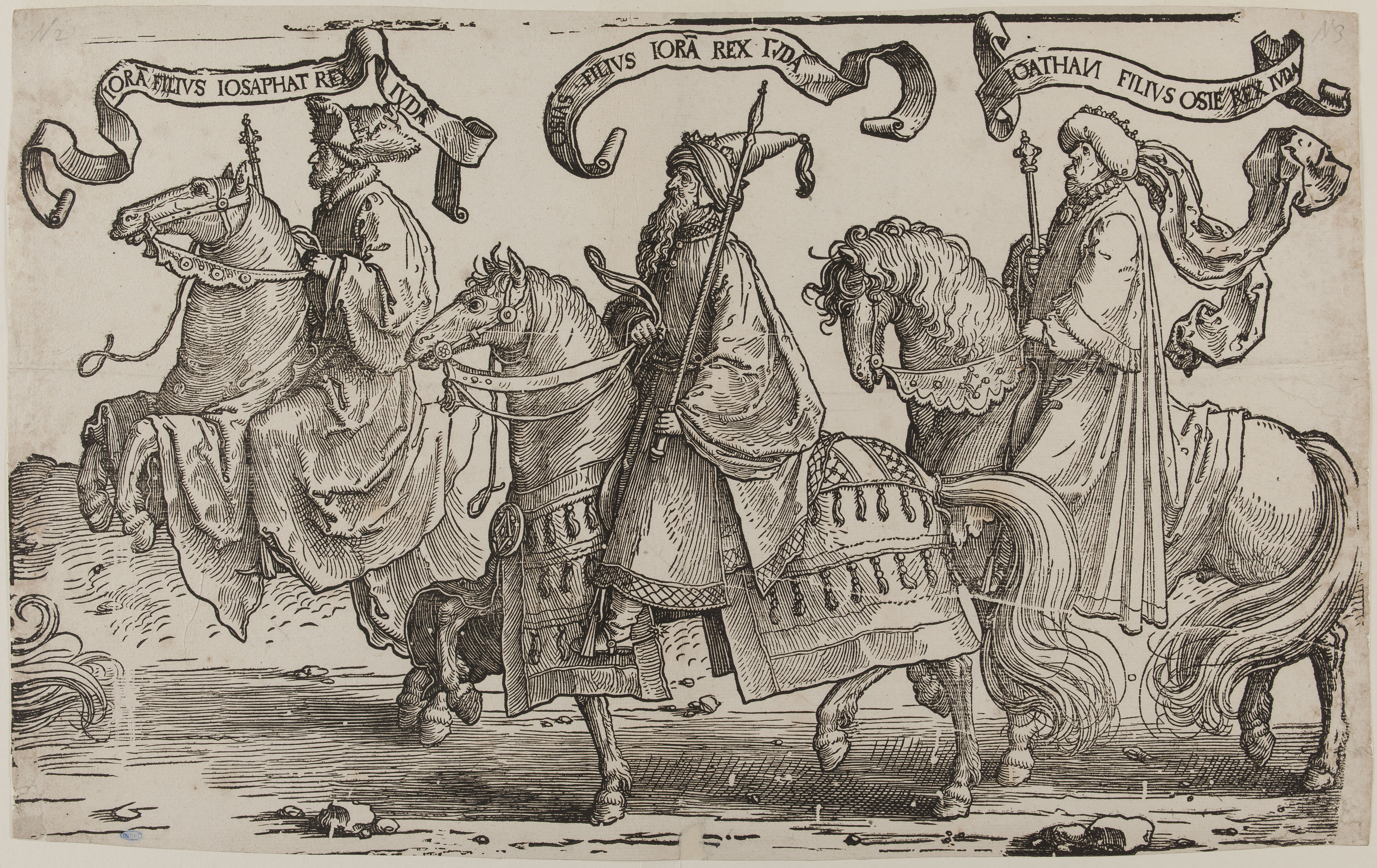
Jehoram, Uzziah, and Jotham, by Lucas van Leyden

Uzziah (/əˈzaɪə/; Hebrew: עֻזִּיָּהוּ ‘Uzzīyyāhū, meaning "my strength is Yah"; Greek: Ὀζίας; Latin: Ozias), also known as Azariah (/ˈæzəˈraɪə/; Hebrew: עֲזַרְיָה ‘Ăzaryā; Greek: Αζαρίας; Latin: Azarias), was the tenth king of the ancient Kingdom of Judah, and one of Amaziah's sons. (2 Chronicles 26:1) Uzziah was 16 when he became king of Judah and reigned for 52 years. The first 24 years of his reign were as a co-regent with his father, Amaziah.

William F. Albright dates Uzziah's reign to 783–742 BC. Edwin R. Thiele's chronology has Uzziah becoming coregent with his father Amaziah in 792/791 BCE and sole ruler of Judah after his father's death in 768/767 BCE. According to Jewish tradition, Uzziah was struck with tzaraath for disobeying God (2 Kings 15:5, 2 Chronicles 26:19–21). Thiele dates Uzziah's being struck with tzaraath to 751/750 BCE, at which time his son Jotham took over the government, with Uzziah living on until 740/739 BCE. Pekah became king of Israel in the last year of Uzziah's reign.

The Gospel of Matthew lists Uzziah in the genealogy of Jesus.

== Name ==
Uzziah is referred to several times in the Hebrew Bible as Azariah. According to Catholic theologian James F. Driscoll, the second form of his name is most likely the result of a copyist's error.

2 Kings mentions Azariah 8 times and Uzziah 4 times, whereas Chronicles consistently refers to Uzziah. There are many reasons for this use of multiple names for kings, but one of them is that kings used both their royal and secular names. For example, Solomon was his royal name, and his secular name at birth was Jedidiah. Uzziah is also a royal name, and Azariah is likely a personal name. Regnal names were given at the time of anointing and coronation.

== Biblical narrative ==
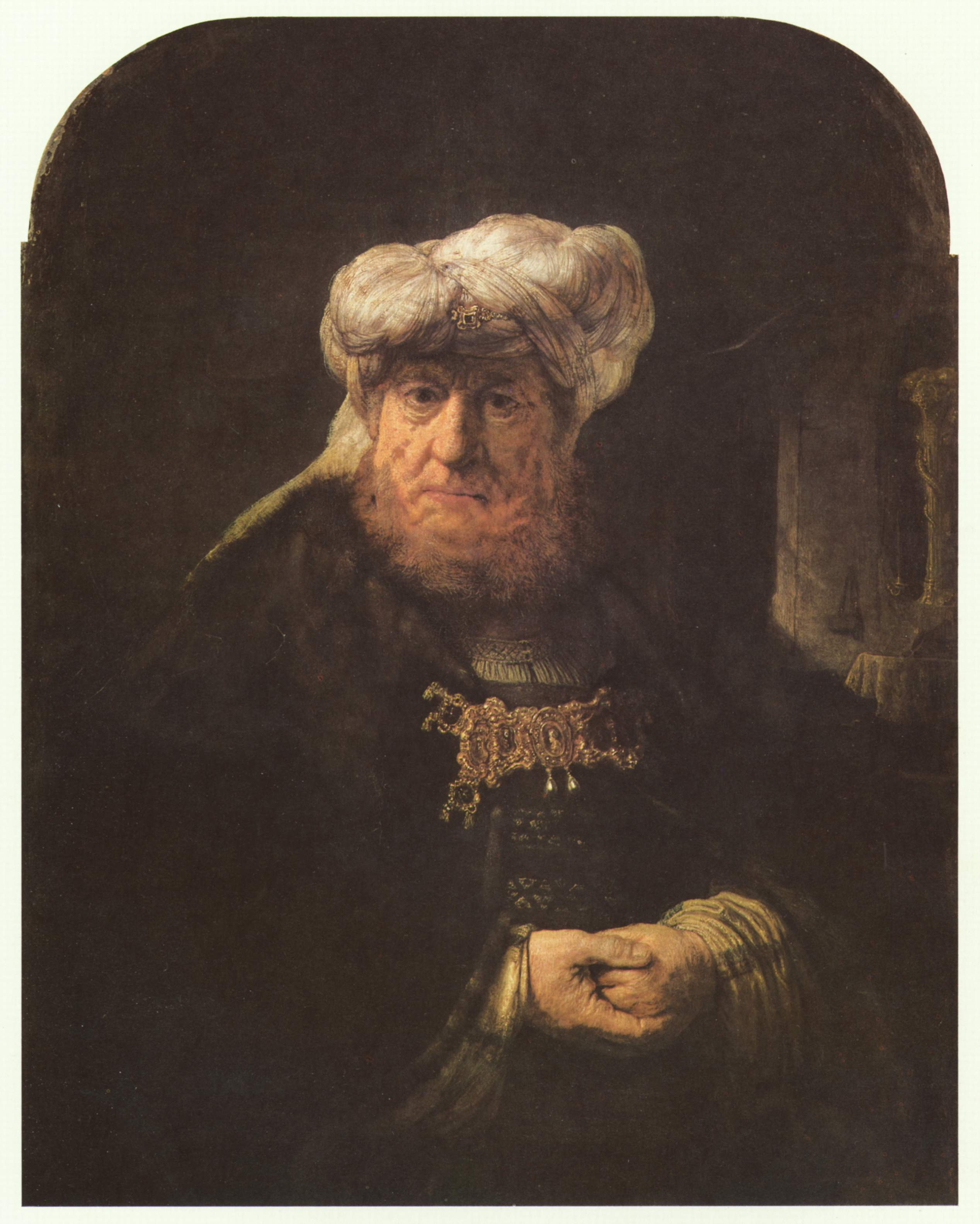
The King Uzziah Stricken with Leprosy, by Rembrandt, 1635.

Uzziah took the throne at age 16 and reigned for about 52 years. His reign was "the most prosperous excepting that of Jehoshaphat since the time of Solomon." In the earlier part of his reign, under the influence of a prophet named Zechariah, he was faithful to God and "did that which was right in the eyes of the Lord" (2 Kings 15:3; 2 Chronicles 26:4–5). The Kings record (ib. xv. 2) states that his reign extended through fifty-two years (788–737 B.C.), and that he was righteous as his father had been, though he did not take away the high places, but allowed the people to sacrifice and burn incense at them. II Chron. xxvi. relates how Uzziah conquered the Philistines and the Arabians and received tribute from the Ammonites; how he fortified his country, reorganized and reequipped his army, and personally engaged in agricultural pursuits. His success as king, administrator, and commander-in-chief of the army made him ruler over the largest realm of Judah since the disruption of the kingdom. His power and authority over the peoples of this realm help to explain to a certain extent the political situation in the reign of Judah's later kings, and probably also in 739, when Tiglathpileser III conquered nineteen districts in northern Syria which had belonged to Uzziah (Azri-ia-u). In Jerusalem he made machines designed by skillful men for use on the towers and on the corner defenses to shoot arrows and hurl large stones. He was a vigorous and able ruler, and "his name spread abroad, even to the entrance of Egypt." (2 Chronicles 26:8–14).

Uzziah's strength became his weakness; for he attempted to usurp the power of the priesthood in burning incense in the Temple of Yhwh. He entered the Temple to burn incense on the altar of incense. Azariah the high priest saw this as an attempt to usurp the prerogatives of the priests and confronted him with a band of eighty priests, saying, "It is not for you, Uzziah, to burn incense to the Lord, but for the priests, the sons of Aaron, who are consecrated to burn incense" (2 Chronicles 26:18). In the meantime a great earthquake shook the ground, and a rent was made in the temple, and the bright rays of the sun shone through it, and fell upon the king's face, insomuch that the leprosy (Hebrew: tzaraath) seized upon him immediately (Josephus Flavius, Antiquities IX 10:4). Uzziah was suddenly struck with leprosy before he had offered the incense (2 Chronicles 26:19), and he was driven from the Temple and compelled to reside in "a separate house" until his death (2 Kings 15:5, 27; 2 Chronicles 26:3). The government was turned over to his son Jotham (2 Kings 15:5), a coregency that lasted for the last 11 years of Uzziah's life (751/750 to 740/739 BC). The total number of years, fifty-two, attributed to Uzziah's reign include the period from his accession to his death.

He was buried in a separate grave "in the field of the burial which belonged to the kings" (2 Kings 15:7; 2 Chronicles 26:23).

=== Biblical references ===
- The Book of Isaiah uses "the year that king Uzziah died" as a reference point for describing the vision in which Isaiah sees the Lord of Hosts (Isaiah 6:1).
- The Book of Amos dates its words as being received when "Uzziah was king of Judah" (Amos 1.1).
- Another Uzziah, a Simeonite, son of Micah, is mentioned as the first of the city magistrates in Bethulia, Judith's town in the apocryphal Book of Judith.

== Archaeology ==
Archaeological findings from Mesopotamia—in the form of Assyrian correspondence and administrative texts discovered at Nimrud and sculptures from the royal palaces of Nineveh—indicate close ties between Assyria and Judah between the reigns of Uzziah and Manasseh and are evidence that Uzziah was contemporary with Tiglath-Pileser III. A highly fragmentary portion attributed to Tiglath-Pileser's annals mention the king "Azaria'u" of "Ya'uda", seemingly "Azariah of Judah", which some have stated is a reference to Uzziah; however, Nadav Na'aman showed the fragment actually belongs to the time of Sennacherib and refers not to Azariah but to Hezekiah. In Tiglath-Pileser's annals there are two references to an Azariah, but neither of these make any reference to his country being Judah, making an identification with the biblical figure dubious.

Uzziah's name appears in two unprovenanced iconic stone seals discovered in 1858 and 1863. The first is inscribed l’byw ‘bd / ‘zyw, "[belonging] to ’Abiyah, minister of ‘Uziyah", and the second (rev.) lšbnyw ‘ / bd ‘zyw, "[belonging] to Shubnayah, minister of ‘Uziyah." Despite being of unprovenanced origin, they are the first authentic contemporary attestations to the ancient king.

=== Uzziah Tablet ===
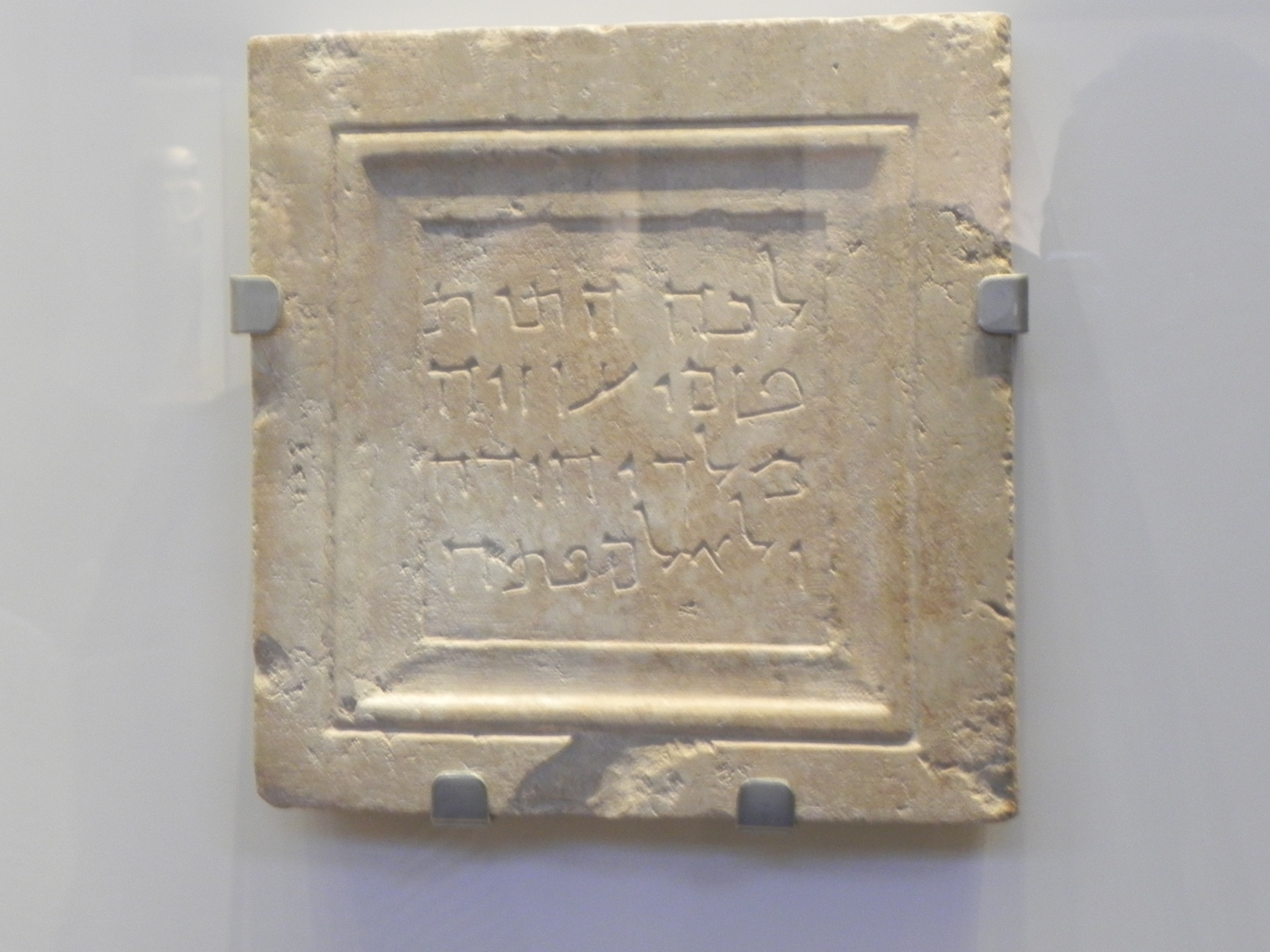
Gravestone of King Uzziah in Jerusalem

In 1931, an archaeological find known as the Uzziah Tablet was discovered by Professor E. L. Sukenik of the Hebrew University. He came across the artifact in the collection of the Russian Convent of the Ascension on the Mount of Olives, put together by the convent's founder, Archimandrite Antonin Kapustin. The provenance of the tablet previous to this is unknown and was not documented by the convent. The strongest theory as to its origin comes from a medieval Jewish source that locates the tomb of Uzziah on the modern site of the convent, which suggests that the tablet might have been discovered during the construction of the convent in the 1870s. The inscription on the tablet is written in an Aramaic dialect very similar to Biblical Aramaic. According to its script, it is dated to around 30–70 CE, around 700 years after the supposed death of Uzziah of 2 Kings and 2 Chronicles. Nevertheless, the inscription is translated, "Hither were brought the bones of Uzziah, king of Judah. Not to be opened." Accordingly, it may be that there was a later reburial of Uzziah during the Second Temple period.

=== Earthquake in the days of Uzziah ===
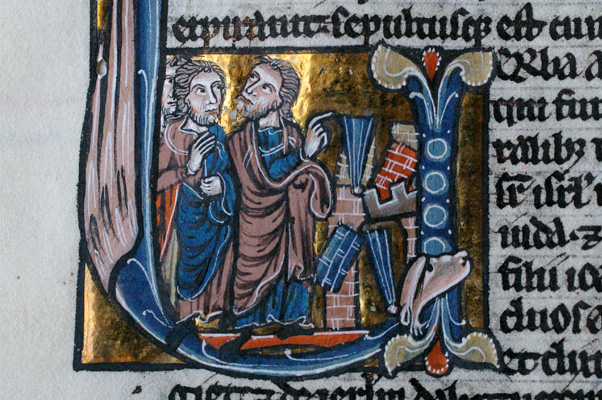
A depiction of the earthquake in the Book of Amos; Illuminated Bible from the 1220s, National Library of Portugal

A major earthquake is referred to in the book of the prophet Amos. Amos dates his prophecy to "two years before the earthquake, when Uzziah was king of Judah and Jeroboam II son of Jehoash was king of Israel" (Amos 1:1, NIV). Over 200 years later, the prophet Zechariah predicted a future earthquake from which the people would flee as they fled in the days of Uzziah (Zechariah 14:5). Geologists believe they have found evidence of this major earthquake in sites throughout Israel and Jordan. (Note: Uziel & Chalaf (2021): "Beyond the biblical text, paleo-seismic and archaeological data can be coupled to support the historicity of an earthquake effecting the region in the mid-eighth century BCE. Destruction at sites in the north, such as Hazor (Yadin 1975), Deir 'Alla (Agnon 2014), Gezer (Austin, Franz and Frost 2000), Tel Agol (Feigin in press) and further south, Tell es-Safi/Gath (Chadwick and Maeir 2018) have been attributed to the eighth century BCE earthquake. In fact, the effects of the earthquake had affected both sides of the Jordan Valley Rift (Refael and Agnon 2018). These sties all displayed archaeological evidence of destruction that could be conclusively dated to the mid-eighth century BCE, based on their stratigraphic and archaeological findings. At certain sites, the destruction was clearly not caused by human interaction. [...] Coupled with evidence from lake seismites from Dead Sea cores (e.g., Refael and Agnon 2018: 772), which indicate a disruption in the sea bedding caused by earthquakes in antiquity, there is convincing evidence of a significant earthquake which caused destruction at sites throughout Israel and Transjordan.") The geologists write:

Masonry walls best display the earthquake, especially walls with broken ashlars, walls with displaced rows of stones, walls still standing but leaning or bowed, and walls collapsed with large sections still lying course-on-course. Debris at six sites (Hazor, Deir 'Alla, Gezer, Lachish, Tell Judeideh, and 'En Haseva) is tightly confined stratigraphically to the middle of the 8th-century B.C., with dating errors of ~30 years. ... The earthquake was at least magnitude 7.8, but likely was 8.2. ... This severe geologic disaster has been linked historically to a speech delivered at the city of Bethel by a shepherd-farmer named Amos of Tekoa."

An exact date for this earthquake would be of considerable interest to archaeologists and historians, because it would allow a synchronization of the earthquake at all the sites affected by it in Israel, Jordan, Lebanon and Syria. Currently, the stratigraphic evidence at Gezer dates the earthquake at 760 BC, plus or minus 25 years, while Yadin and Finkelstein date the earthquake level at Hazor to 760 BC based on stratigraphic analysis of the destruction debris. Similarly, Ussishkin dates the "sudden destruction" level at Lachish to approximately 760 BC. A 2019 Haaretz report by geologists studying layers of sediment on the floor of the Dead Sea further confirms the occurrence of this particular seismic event.

Amos says that the earthquake was in the days of Uzziah king of Judah and Jeroboam (II), son of Jehoash king of Israel. The reference to Jeroboam II is helpful in restricting the date of Amos' vision, more so than the reference to Uzziah's long reign of 52 years. According to Thiele's widely accepted chronology, Jeroboam II began a coregency with his father in 793/792, became sole regent in 782/781, and died in late summer or the fall of 753 BC. Assuming that the prophecy took place after Uzziah became sole regent in 768/767, Amos' prophecy can be dated to some time after that and some time before Jeroboam's death in 753 BC, with the earthquake two years after that. These dates are consistent with the dates given by the archaeologists above for the earthquake. They are inconsistent with the tradition, found in Josephus and the Talmud but not in the Bible, that the earthquake occurred when Uzziah entered the Temple to offer incense, accepting that the beginning of the Uzziah/Jotham coregency began sometime in the six-month period after Nisan 1 of 750 BC.

=== Further chronological notes ===
The calendars for reckoning the years of kings in Judah and Israel were offset by six months, that of Judah starting in Tishri (in the fall) and that of Israel in Nisan (in the spring). Cross-synchronizations between the two kingdoms therefore often allow narrowing of the beginning or ending dates of a king to within a six-month range. For Uzziah, the Scriptural data allow the narrowing of the beginning of his sole reign to some time between Nisan 1 of 767 BCE and the day before Tishri 1 of the same year.

Some writers object to the use of coregencies in determining the dates of the kings of Judah and Israel, saying that there should be explicit reference to coregencies if they existed. Since there is no word for "coregency" in Biblical Hebrew, an explicit mention using this word is not found. Coregencies are well attested in Egypt, and in giving the year of their reign, the timelines of the pharaohs do not relate whether it is measured from a coregency. Egyptologists must determine the existence of a coregency from a comparison of chronological data, just as Thiele and those who have followed him have done from the chronological data of Scripture.

In the case of Uzziah, however, the statement that after he was stricken with leprosy, his son Jotham had charge of the palace and governed the people of the land (2 Kings 15:5) is a fairly straightforward indication of what in modern terms is called a coregency. Also there must have been a coregency in the beginning of Uzziah reign, as the bible states he became king in the 27th year of Jerobeam II, his father Amaziah ruled for 29 years. Amaziah is said to have become king in the second year of Joash from Israel, who ruled for 16 years, so Amaziah's death should then have been in the 14th year of Jerobeam II, creating a gap of more than a decade that can only be filled by coregencies, with years counted including coregencies (as done in Egypt).

Not all of the coregencies for the kings of Judah and Israel are as easy to identify as the Uzziah/Jotham coregency indicated by 2 Kings 15:5, but those who ignore coregencies in constructing the history of this time have failed to produce any chronology for the period that has found widespread acceptance. After noting how David set a pattern by setting his son Solomon on the throne before his death, Nadav Na'aman wrote, "When taking into account the permanent nature of the co-regency in Judah from the time of Joash, one may dare to conclude that dating the co-regencies accurately is indeed the key for solving the problems of biblical chronology in the eighth century BC".

The dates given in the infobox above are those of Thiele, except the starting date for the Amaziah/Uzziah coregency is taken as one year later than that given by Thiele, following Leslie McFall. This implies that Uzziah's 52 years are to be taken in a non-accession sense, which was Thiele's general practice for coregencies, but which he did not follow in the case of Uzziah.

== See also ==
- List of biblical figures identified in extra-biblical sources

== Notes ==
Uzziah House of David
Preceded by Amaziah	King of Judah; Coregent: 791–768 BCE; Sole reign: 767–751 BCE; Leprous and coregent: 751–740 BCE	Succeeded by Jotham
