= Mbunia =

- Town
- Location within Democratic Republic of the Congo
- Coordinates: 0.451°N 28.901°E
- Country: Democratic Republic of the Congo
- Province: North Kivu
- Territory: Lubero Territory
- Time zone: UTC+2 (CAT)

Mbunia is a small town in North Kivu in eastern Democratic Republic of the Congo.
