= Zechariah of Israel =

King of the Kingdom of Israel; son of Jeroboam II

Zechariah זְכַרְיָה
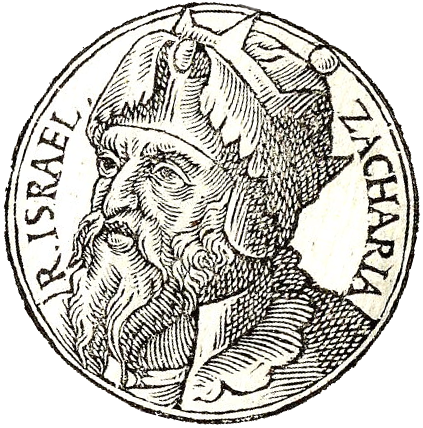
- Portrait from Promptuarium Iconum Insigniorum (1553)

King of Israel (Northern Kingdom)
- Reign: c. 752 BC (reigned 6 months)
- Predecessor: Jeroboam II
- Successor: Shallum
- Died: 752 BC; Kingdom of Israel
Names
- Zechariah ben Jeroboam
- Father: Jeroboam II

Zechariah (Hebrew: זְכַרְיָה Zəḵaryā, meaning "remembered by Yah"; also Zachariah, Zacharias; Latin: Zacharias) was the fourteenth king of the northern Israelite Kingdom of Israel, and son of Jeroboam II.

Zechariah became king of Israel in Samaria in the thirty-eighth year of Azariah, king of Judah. (2 Kings 15:8) William F. Albright has dated his reign to 746–745 BC, while E. R. Thiele offers the dates 753–752 BC.

The account of his reign is briefly told in 2 Kings (2 Kings 15:8–12). According to the Bible, Zechariah did what was evil in the Lord's sight, as the previous kings of Israel since Jeroboam I had done. Zechariah ruled Israel for only six months before Shallum, a captain from his own army, murdered him and took the throne. This ended the dynasty of Jehu after four generations of his descendants, fulfilling the prophecy in 2 Kings 10:30.

Zechariah of Israel House of Jehoshaphat; Contemporary Kings of Judah: Uzziah/Azariah
Regnal titles
Preceded by Jeroboam II	King of Israel; 753–752 BCE	Succeeded by Shallum
