= Zachary's Chicago Pizza =

Pizza restaurant chain in California

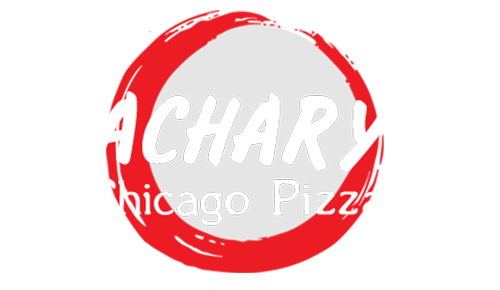

Restaurant information
- Established: July 25, 1983
- Owner: Employee-Owned (ESOP)
- Previous owners: Zach Zachowski and Barbara Gabel
- Food type: Chicago-style stuffed pizza
- Location: 5801 College Avenue, Oakland, Alameda County, California
- Other locations: Berkeley, Livermore, Grand Lake, Oakland, Pleasant Hill, Pleasanton
- Other information: Employee-owned restaurant chain
- Website: zacharys.com

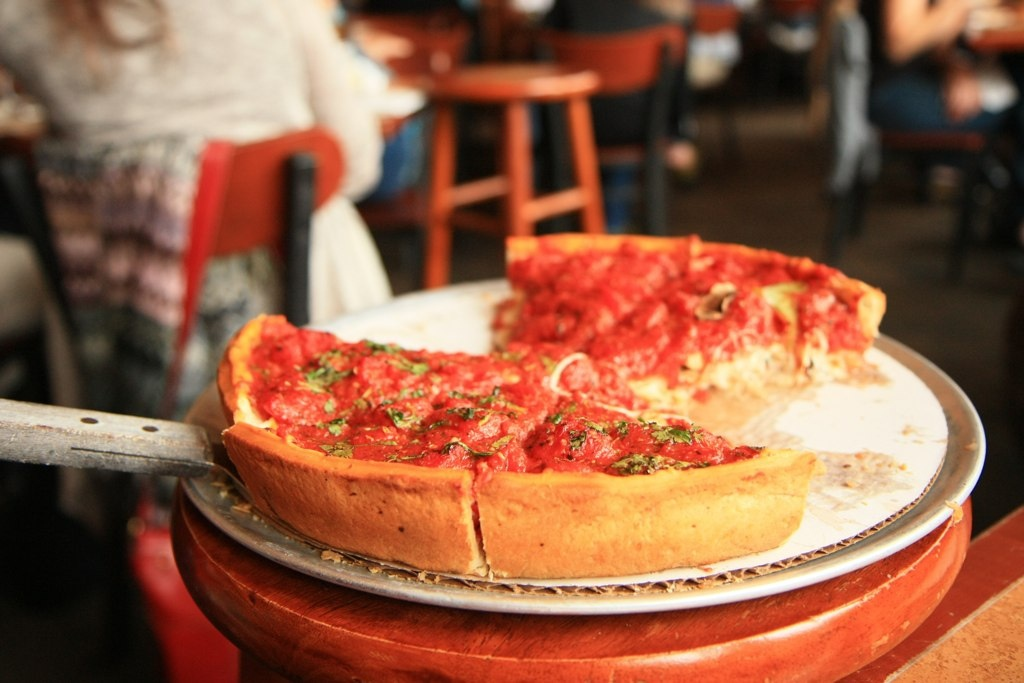
A stuffed Chicago-style pizza served at Zachary's Chicago Pizza

Zachary's Chicago Pizza is a Chicago-style stuffed pizza employee-owned restaurant business based in Oakland, California. As of 2026, Zachary's has 6 locations in the East Bay region. The company has received "Best Pizza" recognitions from the San Francisco Chronicle, East Bay Times, San Francisco Magazine, The Daily Californian, Oakland Magazine, among others.

== History ==
The company was founded on July 25, 1983 by Zach Zachowski and Barbara Gabel. The initial restaurant was located in Rockridge, Oakland, California. In 1984, Zachary's opened a second location in Berkeley, California on Solano Avenue. According to the company, the restaurant began receiving regional recognition within its first decade, winning "Best Pizza" from East Bay Express and San Francisco Magazine. In 2003, Zach Zachowski and Barbara Gabel retired the company transiting the ownership to employees through an employee stock ownership plan (ESOP). Over time, the ESOP let long-term employees accumulate company stock tax-free.

A third Zachary's location opened in San Ramon in September 2006, the first in Contra Costa County. The company became 100% employee-owned in 2011. The company further expanded in 2013 with a fourth location in Pleasant Hill. In 2019, Zachary's opened a second location Oakland, California on Grand Avenue, becoming its fifth location overall. In 2021, lease renewal negotiations for Zachary's San Ramon location fell through, resulting in its closure and relocation to Pleasanton. On February 2, 2026, Zachary's opened its sixth location overall in Livermore, California, its second in the Tri-Valley region.
