= Amaziah of Judah =

Ninth king of Judah

Amaziah
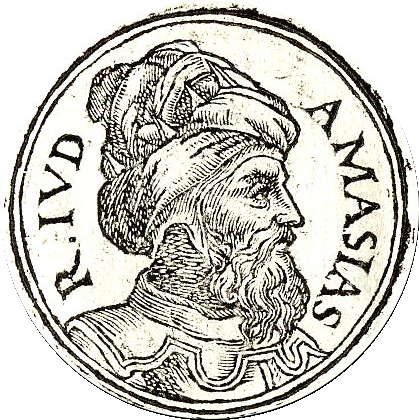
- Amaziah from Guillaume Rouillé's Promptuarii Iconum Insigniorum, 1553

King of Judah
- Reign: 796–792 BCE (over Judah); 796–767 BCE (entire reign)
- Predecessor: Joash
- Successor: Uzziah
- Born: c. 822 BCE
- Died: c. 767 BCE
- Spouse: Jecoliah
- Issue: Uzziah
- House: House of David
- Father: Joash
- Mother: Jehoaddan of Jerusalem

Amaziah of Judah (pronounced /æməˈzaɪ.ə/, Hebrew: אֲמַצְיָהוּ, romanized: ʼĂmaṣyāhū, lit. 'meaning "the strength of the Lord", "strengthened by Yahweh", or "Yahweh is mighty"'; Greek: Αμασίας; Latin: Amasias; c. 822 – c. 767 BCE), was the ninth king of Judah and the son and successor of Joash. His mother was Jehoaddan (2 Kings 14:1–4) and his son was Uzziah (2 Chronicles 26:1). He took the throne at the age of 25, after the assassination of his father, and reigned for 29 years (2 Kings 14:2 2 Chronicles 25:1), 24 years of which were with the co-regency of his son. The second Book of Kings and the second Book of Chronicles in the Hebrew Bible consider him a righteous king, but with some hesitation. He is praised for killing the assassins of his father only and sparing their children, as dictated by the Mosaic Law.

Edwin R. Thiele dates Amaziah's reign from 797/796 to 768/767 BCE. Thiele's chronology has his son Uzziah becoming co-regent with him in the fifth year of his reign, in 792/791 BCE, when Uzziah was 16 years old.

== Reign ==
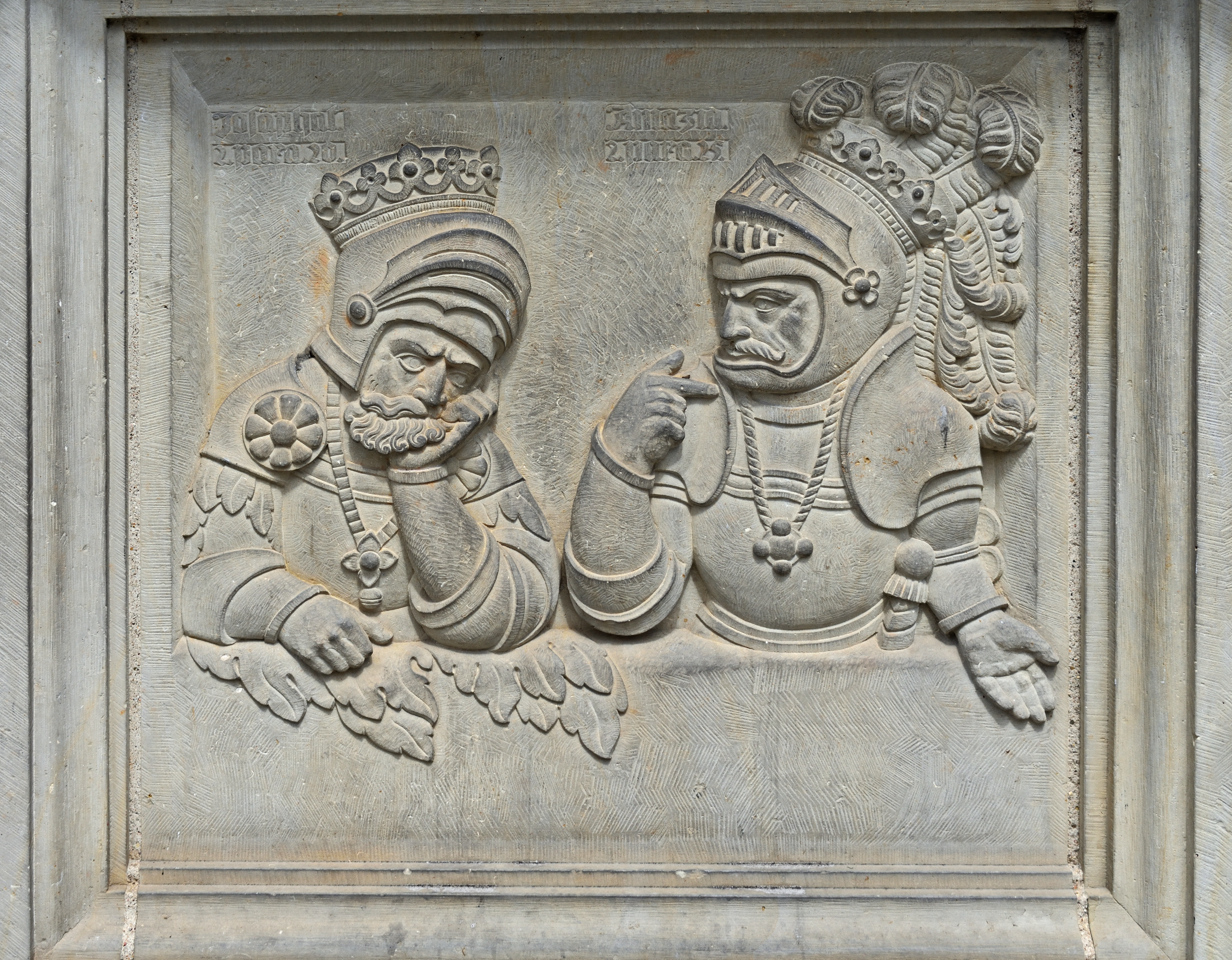
Kings Jehoshaphat (left) and Amaziah (right), the fountain at the Historic Market Place, Hildesheim, Germany.

As soon as his kingdom was established, Amaziah executed the murderers of his father, but he permitted their children to live in obedience to the Mosaic law:

Fathers shall not be put to death for their children, nor shall children be put to death for their fathers; a person shall be put to death for his own sin.

According to Chronicles, Amaziah was the first to employ a mercenary army of 100,000 soldiers from Ephraim (a force significantly larger than the one Alexander used for his conquest of Asia-minor) with 100 talents, as a supplement to his 300,000 Judean soldiers, in an attempt to reconquer Edom, which had rebelled during the reign of Jehoram, his great-grandfather. He was commanded by an unnamed prophet to send back the mercenaries, with whom he acquiesced (2 Chronicles 25:7–10, 13), much to the annoyance of the mercenaries. His obedience to this command was followed by a decisive victory over the Edomites (2 Chronicles 25:14–16).

Due to the Israelite mercenaries' anger at being excluded from the battle, they attacked and looted multiple towns in Judah. Amaziah resembled his father: at the beginning of his reign he was God fearing. Yet despite the fact that with the aid of God, Amaziah had won a brilliant victory over the Edomites, he knew no better way of manifesting his gratitude than to establish in Jerusalem the cult of the idol worshipped by his conquered foes. An unnamed prophet rebuked him for this, and the king responded by threatening him that if he continued to admonish him, he would have him executed. To compass his chastisement, God inspired Amaziah with the idea of provoking a war with Joash, the ruler of the northern kingdom. His victory over Edom inflated his pride, and he challenged to combat Jehoash, grandson of Jehu, king of Israel. Amaziah demanded that Joash should either recognize the suzerainty of the southern realm voluntarily, or let the fate of battle decide the question. At first Jehoash sought to turn Amaziah aside from his purpose by a parable reminding him of the fate of Shechem, which the sons of Jacob had visited upon him for having done violence to their sister Dinah. Amaziah refused to be warned. Jehoash's disdain and scorn for Amaziah are embodied in the stinging parable of the thistle and the cedar (2 Kings 14:9). In his resentment, Amaziah rushed into a disastrous battle at Beth-shemesh, and a humiliating defeat overtook his army and the land. The king was captured, 400 cubits of the wall of Jerusalem were broken down, the city, Temple, and palace were looted, and hostages were carried to Samaria.

His defeat was followed by a conspiracy which took his life. He, like his father, was the victim of assassins, apparently bent upon killing the one who had brought such dire disasters upon the land. After his defeat Amaziah was tortured to death by his own subjects at Lachish, to which he had fled, and his body was brought to Jerusalem, where it was buried in the royal sepulcher (2 Kings 14:19–20; 2 Chronicles 25:27–28). While the narrative in 2 Kings records the conspiracy "in fact only", the Chronicler "characteristically connects the conspiracy with Amaziah’s apostasy", which took place "after the time that" (and by implication, because) "Amaziah turned away from following the Lord".

The rabbis of the Talmud declared, based upon a rabbinic tradition, that Prophet Amoz was the brother of Amaziah (אמציה), the king of Judah at that time (and, as a result, the Prophet Isaiah himself was a member of the royal family).

== Biblical evaluation ==
According to the Books of Kings, Amaziah "did what was right in the sight of the Lord", but did not meet the standard of righteousness set by King David; in particular, because he did not remove the local shrines on the "high places" and centralize worship in Jerusalem. The writer of the Books of Chronicles also considers that during the earlier part of his reign, "he did what was right in the sight of the Lord, but not with a loyal heart".

Biblical scholar H. P. Mathys notes that 2 Chronicles 25:7–10, verses which deals with Amaziah's discharge of the mercenary army, are "often regarded as having stemmed from an independent source available to the Chronicler, since they do not conform with his theology.

== Chronological notes ==
The calendars for reckoning the years of kings in Judah and Israel were offset by six months, that of Judah starting in Tishri (in the fall) and that of Israel in Nisan (in the spring). Cross-synchronizations between the two kingdoms therefore often allow narrowing of the beginning or ending dates of a king to within a six-month range. For Amaziah, the Scriptural data allow the narrowing of his accession to some time between Nisan 1 of 796 BCE and the day before Tishri 1 of the same BCE year. For calculation purposes, this should be taken as the Judean year beginning in Tishri of 797/796 BC, or more simply 797 BCE. His death occurred at some time between Nisan 1 and Tishri 1 of 767 BCE, i.e. in 768/767 by Judean reckoning, or more simply 768 BCE.

Amaziah of Judah House of David Cadet branch of the Tribe of Judah
Regnal titles
Preceded by Jehoash	King of Judah; 797–768 BCE	Succeeded by Uzziah
