= Guillaume Rouillé =

French humanist bookseller-printer (c.1504–1589)

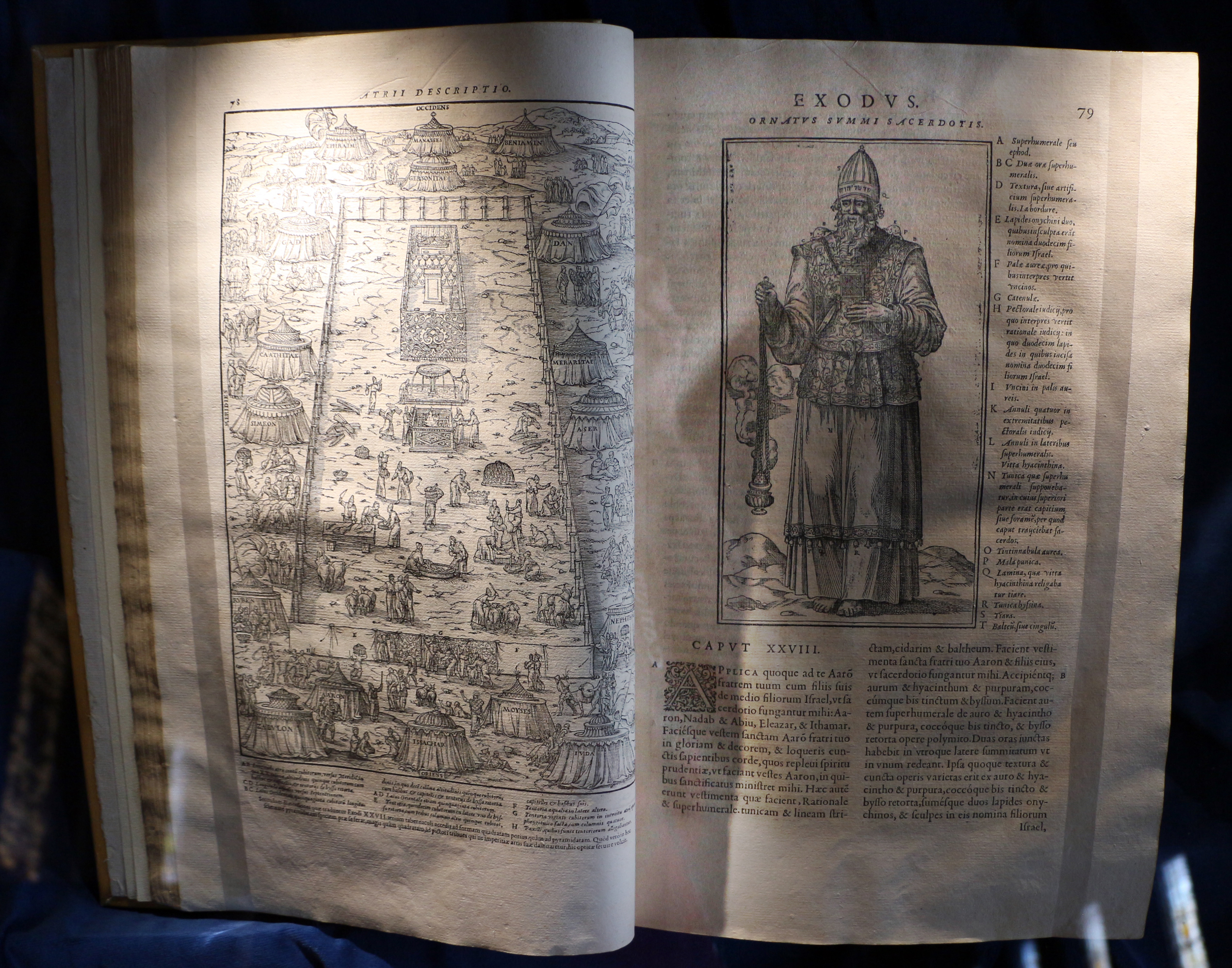
Edition of the Vulgate by Guillaume Rouillé, 1566

Guillaume Rouillé (French pronunciation: [ɡijom ʁuje]; Latin: Gulielmus Rovillius; c. 1504 – 1589), also called Roville or Rovillius, was one of the most prominent humanist bookseller-printers in 16th-century Lyon. He invented the pocket book format called the sextodecimo, printed with sixteen leaves to the folio sheet, half the size of the octavo format, and published many works of history and poetry as well as medicine, in addition to his useful compilations and handbooks.

Rouillé was born in Tours. Though he was a Frenchman, he served his apprenticeship in the Venetian printing-house of Gabriele Giolito de' Ferrari, and retained his connections with Venice as a source of texts after his arrival in Lyon around 1543.

Among his works was the French translation by Barthélemy Aneau of Andrea Alciato's pioneering emblem book, which formed part of a major publishing venture in Lyons by the team of Guillaume Rouillé and his printer Macé Bonhomme, 1549, which extended to translations in Italian and Spanish. Rouillé also published books of imprese by Paolo Giovio and Gabriele Simeoni. Another work of iconography was the useful compilation of portrait types of Antiquity, Promptuarii iconum insigniorum à seculo hominum, subiectis eorum vitis, per compendium ex probatissimis autoribus desumptis (First and second parts, 1553, etc.) in which each medal-like portrait head was followed by a brief biography. Later he was one of the four printers that edited the "Lyon printers tribute to Michael de Villanueva" edition of a Materia Medica, as a tribute for his friend, Michael Servetus, who was executed for heresy. French editions followed, Promptuaire des Medalles des plus renommées personnes..., 1581, etc. His Sententiae omnes undiquaque selectissimae, 1555, compiled moral maxims from the works of Aristotle.

On his title pages his emblem was prominently displayed: an eagle triumphant atop a globe on a pedestal, flanked by serpents with entwined tails. His heirs continued the press into the 17th century.

Rouillé died in Lyon on 20 June 1589.
