= Timeline of ancient Israel and Judah =

The following is a chronology of events in ancient Israel and Judah during the Iron Age.

== Early Israelites ==
1208 BCE

- The creation of the Merneptah Stele (also known as the Israel Stele), in which Egyptian Pharaoh Merneptah claims to have destroyed a people called "Israel".

c. 1200 BCE

- Early Israelites began settling in the central highlands of Canaan.

== Monarchic period ==
=== United Monarchy ===
1027 BCE

- Suggested beginning of Saul's reign.

1006 BCE

- Suggested end of Saul's reign.

1005 BCE

- Suggested beginning of David's reign.

970 BCE

- Suggested end of David's reign; he is succeeded by his son, Solomon.

=== Divided Monarchy ===
c. 931 BCE

- Suggested beginning of Jeroboam I's reign in Israel and Rehoboam's reign in Judah. According to the biblical narrative, after the death of Solomon, representatives of the northern tribes of Israel demanded that his son, Rehoboam, make changes to the kingdom's governance. When Rehoboam refused, the ten northern tribes rejected his rule and chose Jeroboam, a former rebel, as their king. These tribes retained the name "Israel" and established the northern kingdom, while the tribes of Judah and Benjamin remained loyal to the Davidic line, forming the kingdom of Judah. This division marked the beginning of the era of the Divided Monarchy.

914 BCE

- Rehoboam of Judah dies; he is replaced by Abijah.

911 BCE

- Abijah dies and is succeeded by Asa as the king of Judah.

c. 910 BCE

- Death of Jeroboam I of Israel.

909 BCE

- Short reign of Nadab of Israel; he is succeeded by Baasha in the same year.

886 BCE

- Death of Baasha.

885 BCE

- Elah reigns briefly over Israel before being killed by the chariot commander Zimri, who rules for seven days before being overthrown by Omri, who then establishes the Omride dynasty over Israel.

871 BCE

- Jehoshaphat ascends to the throne of Judah.

c. 853 BCE

- The Battle of Qarqar took place between Shalmaneser III of Assyria and a coalition of allied kings. Ahab of Israel contributed the second-largest contingent of troops, along with the largest number of chariots, to the coalition army. The battle is recorded on the Assyrian Kurkh Monoliths, which provide a detailed account of the conflict.

c. 852–851 BCE

- Ahaziah rules Israel.

851 BCE

- Jehoram ascends to the throne of Israel.

848 BCE

- Jehoram ascends to the throne of Judah.

841 BCE

- Hazael of Aram-Damascus conducts a campaign against Israel and Judah; Jehoram of Israel and Ahaziah of Judah die; according to the Bible, Jehoram is wounded in battle and later killed by the usurper Jehu alongside Ahaziah of Judah in Jezreel, during a purge of the Omri dynasty. In the Tel Dan Stele, Hazael claims responsibility for their deaths. Jehu becomes king of Israel, founding a new ruling dynasty. Jehu of Israel sends tribute to Shalmaneser III of Assyria, as recorded on the Black Obelisk.

734–732 BCE

- Tiglath-Pileser III campaigns against Israel, conquering Galilee and Transjordan. He also records receiving tribute from Ahaz of Judah.

722–720 BCE

- Samaria is conquered by Shalmaneser V and Sargon II; this event is documented in the Sargon II Display Inscriptions, Nimrud Prism, Assur Charter, and Babylonian Chronicle I, and corresponds with the biblical account in 2 Kings 17:5–6 and 18:9–12.

701 BCE

- Sennacherib's conquest of Lachish and the siege of Jerusalem.

c. 676 BCE

- Manasseh of Judah contributes forced laborers to Esarhaddon for construction projects in Nineveh, as recorded in an Assyrian prism.

667 BCE

- Manasseh of Judah sends tribute to Ashurbanipal during the Assyrian campaign against Egypt.

597 BCE

- Nebuchadnezzar II's first siege of Jerusalem culminated in the city's fall on March 16. In the aftermath, Zedekiah was installed as king of Judah.

587/586 BCE

- Jerusalem is besieged and destroyed by Nebuchadnezzar II of Babylon. 2 Kings 25:8 and Jeremiah 52:12 date the fall to his 19th regnal year (traditionally 586 BCE); other evidence, such as Jeremiah 52:29, which records a deportation in his 18th year, suggests variation in regnal year calculation. Based on this, the actual fall likely occurred in July 587 BCE.

== See also ==
- Chronology of the Bible
- History of the ancient Levant
- Timeline of Jewish history
- Timeline of the Second Temple period

== Bibliography ==
- Stiebing, William H.; Helft, Susan N. (2023). Ancient Near Eastern History and Culture (4th ed.). Routledge. ISBN 9780367744250.
- van Bekkum, Koert (2022). "Competing Chronologies, Competing Histories: Ancient Israel and the Chronology of the Southern Levant ca. 1200–587 BCE". In Keimer, Kyle H.; Pierce, George A. (eds.). The Ancient Israelite World. Routledge. ISBN 9780367815691.
