= Zimri (king) =

Zimri זִמְרִי
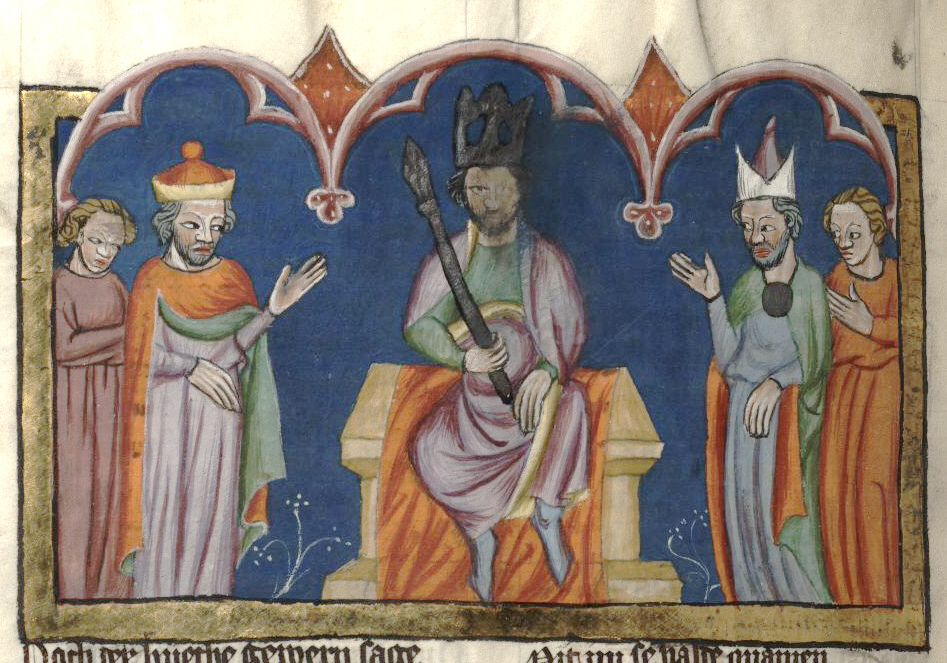
- Depiction of the coronation of Zimri, from Rudolf von Ems' Chronicle of the World

King of Israel (Northern Kingdom)
- Reign: 885 BCE
- Predecessor: Elah
- Successor: Tibni and Omri
- Died: 885 BC
- House: House of Zimri

Zimri (Hebrew: זִמְרִי, Zīmrī, lit. 'praiseworthy', also transliterated as Zambri due to a Greek corruption of Omri), was the fifth king of Israel. His reign lasted only seven days. William F. Albright has dated his reign to 876 BCE, while E. R. Thiele offers the date 885 BCE. His story is told in 1 Kings, Chapter 16.

== Ancestry ==
According to Louis Ginzberg, Zimri was the only monarch born from the Tribe of Simeon. Reportedly, this Tribe never received a blessing from Moses, and did not have an impact in the royal successions of Israel.

In Judah's Sceptre and Joseph's Birthright (1902), J. H. Allen suggested that Zimri was a descendant of Zerah. Zerah is a character in the Book of Genesis, one of the twin sons of Judah and Tamar. Zerah was the twin brother Perez, and one of the founding members of the Tribe of Judah. Allen's speculation was based on the Books of Chronicles. In 1 Chronicles 2:6, another character called "Zimri" is listed among the five sons of Zerah:

The sons of Zerah: Zimri, and Ethan, and Heman, and Calcol, and Dara; five of them in all.

Allen thought it likely that Zimri, son of Zerah was a namesake ancestor of King Zimri.

Tomoo Ishida suggested instead that the narrative of dynastic instability in the Kingdom of Israel suggests an underlying rivalry among tribes for its throne. In the biblical narrative, the House of Jeroboam was from the Tribe of Ephraim, while the House of Baasha was from the Tribe of Issachar. The Omrides are connected in this narrative with the city of Jezreel, where they maintained a second palace. According to the Book of Joshua, Jezreel was controlled by the Tribe of Issachar. Ishida views the narrative as suggesting that the Omrides themselves were members of the Tribe of Issachar. The assassinated king Elah and Omri thus shared a "common tribal origin", and were possibly kinsmen. Omri and the Tribe of Issachar's opposition to Zimri indicates that Zimri was not a member of their tribe.

Ishida views both Zimri and his successor Tibni as likely members of the Tribe of Ephraim, its candidates in an attempt to reclaim the throne. But he also suggests another hypothesis, that Tibni originated from the city of Gina (also known as Beth-haggan) mentioned in the Amarna letters (14th century BC). In the Biblical narrative, this city was under the control of the Tribe of Manasseh. So Tibni could instead be the Tribe of Manasseh's candidate for the throne.

Similarly, genealogist David Hughes speculated that Zimri and Tibni were members of the Tribe of Ephraim, and siblings to each other. He further speculated that they were descendants of Hoshea, son of Azaziah, one of the rulers of the Tribe of Ephraim. Hoshea and Azaziah are characters briefly mentioned in the Books of Chronicles (I Chronicles 27:20), where Hoshea is a contemporary of David:

...of the children of Ephraim, Hoshea the son of Azaziah

== Reign ==
He was the chariot commander who murdered king Elah and all his family members at Tirzah, as Elah was drinking in the house of Arza, his steward. Zimri succeeded Elah as king. However, Zimri reigned only seven days, because the army elected Omri as king. With their support, Omri laid siege to Tirzah. Finding his position untenable, Zimri set fire to the palace, killing himself. Omri solidified his reign only after four years of war with Tibni, another claimant to the throne.

== Analysis ==
In the biblical text, Zimri is introduced as the military commander who leads half of the chariotry in the army of Elah, King of Israel. The text offers no background information on Zimri, focusing entirely on the assassination of Elah by Zimri, and the subsequent extermination of the House of Baasha which Zimri orchestrated. According to Marvin A. Sweeney, this lack of detail is a consequence of the ephemerality of Zimri's reign, which reportedly lasted only seven days. Other than his extermination of the House of Baasha, Zimri apparently had no historical impact.

The motivation behind Zimri's coup d'état is not stated in the biblical text, though it is "readily intelligible" from its context in the narrative. in the late years of his reign, Baasha of Israel had faced a military alliance against him, formed by the Kingdom of Judah and the Arameans. The northernmost areas of the Kingdom of Israel were under the threat of an Aramean invasion, and Baasha had been forced to abandon his control over the city of Ramah in Benjamin. In other words, Israel was facing a military and political disaster, which likely undermined the political support for the reigning House of Baasha.

According to the biblical text, Elah was assassinated in the city of Tirzah. Zimri attacked him within the residence of Arza, who was apparently the royal steward. The sparse narrative offers no other information on Arza. The narrative does mention that Elah was suffering from alcohol intoxication at the time of the assassination.

During his short reign, Zimri reportedly managed to exterminate the entire House of Baasha, along with their kinspeople and their supporters. The narrative claims that Zimri was following an oracle, given by a diviner called Jehu. Zimri reportedly left the corpses of his victims, the members of the House of Baasha, unburied. The corpses were used as food by the local dogs and birds.

The biblical text then mentions that the army of Israel was far from Tirzah at the time of the assassination. The army was besieging Gibbethon, a city controlled by the Philistines. The implication here is that Zimri was free to act, because the absent army could not defend king Elah. Presumably Zimri hoped that he could secure his place on the throne before the army could react to his coup.

In the Biblical narrative, the army of Israel refuses to accept Zimri as a legitimate king, and instead elects its commander Omri as a rival candidate for the throne, an anti-king. The text implies that Zimri used to be subordinate to Omri in the command hierarchy of the army, and still had more influence on the troops than Zimri.

The narrative continues with Omri and his army rapidly marching towards Tirzah, and besieging the city. Zimri apparently did not expect such a rapid response to his coup, and did not have enough time to organize the defense of the city. The city fell after a brief siege. Zimri set the royal palace on fire and died in the flames, choosing suicide by self-immolation over surrendering to Omri.

Following Zimri's death, the narrative continues with a civil war between the rival kings Omri and Tibni. The sparse text leaves it unclear whether Tibni was a supporter of Zimri who took over the leadership of Zimri's political faction, or whether he was an opportunist who was merely attempting to take advantage of the power vacuum created by Zimri.

William H. Barnes interprets the phrase "half the king's chariot" to mean that there were two chariot military formations in the army of Israel. Zimri apparently led a chariot formation stationed at the city of Tirzah itself, from where it could easily respond to military attacks by the Kingdom of Judah. The other formation, which is not mentioned in the text, was likely stationed at the city of Megiddo.

Barnes suggests that Elah was attending a private party at the time of his assassination. The writers of the Books of Kings used this occasion to express their disapproval of political or military leaders drinking to excess. Not directly stated is that Zimri took advantage of the party, to strike at Elah while his guard was down. The host of the party, Arza, was the supervisor of the palace. Making his position equivalent to that of a majordomo or prime minister.

Zimri's elimination of all members of the previous reigning family was a then-"typical procedure", in order to avoid reprisals from Elah's heirs.

Despite holding a high-ranking position in the military, Zimri never receives a patronymic in the biblical narrative. This likely indicates that this monarch's ancestry was humble or obscure. The name 'Zimri" has been suggested to derive from the Aramaic language. Another possible explanation is that it was a theophoric name, a shortening of the phrase "strength of Yahweh". If so, Yahweh was Zimri's tutelary deity.

Barnes calls attention to the siege of Gibbethon in the narrative of Zimri's reign. A previous siege of Gibbethon is mentioned in the First Books of Kings, taking place in the last year of the reign of Nadab of Israel, 24 years before Zimri's rise to the throne. Several writers have suggested that the implication in the text is the army of Israel had been intermittently besieging this city for 24 years, without ever managing to capture it. A testament to the military weakness of Israel under the rule of the House of Baasha.

The biblical narrative views Zimri's death in the flames as a "tragically heroic" manner of dying, indicating that suicide was not seen as a cowardly way to die. Zimri's suicide has similarities to Samson's suicide in the Book of Judges. The text describing the fire is vague enough to allow the possibility that Omri's army had set the palace on fire, instead of Zimri himself. However, the text otherwise indicates that Zimri chose the manner of his death.

The writers of the Books of Kings accuse Zimri of repeating the sins of his distant predecessor, Jeroboam. This is a standard condemnation, used in the narrative to vilify every king of Israel. Zimri did not reign long enough to emulate Jeroboam's policies, or to commit the other sins typically indicated.

While a reign of seven days is usually attributed to Zimri, there is a divergent account in the Greek-language text of the Codex Vaticanus. This variant attributes a reign of seven years to Zimri. The difference likely derives from the Hebrew term "Yamim" and how it was interpreted. It is variously translated as "days" or "years", and specifically translates to "years" in passages from the Books of Samuel.

Barnes notes that there is a discrepancy in the way the narrative depicts Zimri. He is castigated as a usurper and a traitor in nearly every passage of the narrative, yet treated as a tragic hero in the narrative of his death. Zimri's suicide by self-immolation is not unique in ancient narratives. The legendary king Sardanapalus of Assyria supposedly died in this manner, and there are similar accounts on the deaths of the historical kings Shamash-shum-ukin of Babylon (reigned 667–648 BC) and Sinsharishkun of Assyria (reigned c. 627–612 BC).

Barnes notes that Zimri was the last king of Israel to use Tirzah as his capital city. His successor Omri transferred the capital to the city of Samaria.

Hillel I. Millgram draws a number of inferences, based on the available information in the sparse text. First, Zimri's coup was probably the result of "meticulous planning", and prepared in advance. Within a few days, Zimri and his unnamed supporters managed to hunt down and execute the extended royal family, along with its friends and its supporters. This suggests that the entire ruling circle of the Kingdom was swiftly executed. In Millgram's views, this suggests that Zimri had prepared a hit list which identified the intended victims. The executions were likely carried out by death squads employed by Zimri.

Zimri's swift executions seem to have had a clear purpose, to prevent the formation of a counter-revolution which would oppose his regime. He probably expected the rest of the kingdom to accept the regime change as fait accompli, miscalculating his own influence over the royal army. The news of the assassinations may have caught Omri by surprise, but likely inspired the ambitious general to claim the throne for himself. Zimri's purge likely inspired resentment among the troops, which Omri managed to use for his own purposes.

Millgram estimates a distance of 40–50 mi (64–80 km) between Zimri's headquarters in Tirzah, and Omri's headquarters outside the walls of Gibbethon. A distance which an army could cover within two days of loaded marching. The fall of Tirzah after a surprisingly short siege, allows insight into the flaws of Zimri's planning. The capital city lacked the provisions to endure a longer siege. Zimri may have found preparations for a siege unnecessary, or he devoted most of his attention to the purge instead of the defensive measures needed. The general population of the city would be unlikely to take risk in defense of the new regime, as this regime had been dedicated to killing part of the city's residents. The city probably fell with minimal resistance, and Zimri's suicide indicates that Zimri himself accepted the defeat of his forces. His main concern was to escape captivity at the hands of his enemies.

The narrative of his brief reign suggests that Zimri never left Tirzah. Consequently, he did not have the time to make a pilgrimage to the holy site of Bethel, which was a religious duty for the kings of Israel. Millgram makes the observation that the narrative in the Books of Kings presents Zimri as more ruthless and bloodthirsty than the previous usurpers of the king. Jeroboam had usurped the throne from the legitimate king Rehoboam, but did not actually kill Rehoboam. Jeroboam's supporters merely killed Adoniram, one of Rehoboam's subordinate officials. Baasha had usurped the throne from the legitimate king Nadab, by killing both Nadab and the extended royal family of the House of Jeroboam. But Baasha is not mentioned killing Nadab's other supporters. Zimri killed Elah the extended royal family of the House of Baasha, and their supporters. In this narrative of successive usurpations, Zimri's reign thus represents an event of conflict escalation.

The suicide of Zimri plays a role in the narrative concerning the succession. It absolves Omri from accusations of regicide. Following Jeroboam and Nadab, Omri becomes the third king of Israel who has neither committed regicide (unlike Baasha and Zimri), nor is the son of a regicide (unlike Elah).

According to Edward F. Campbell, there is one distinctive feature of the biblical narrative concerning the kings Zimri and Omri. The military of Israel itself is the instigator of the action in this narrative, assisting in the elevation of both kings in power. No prophet is depicted in this narrative, there is neither divine intervention, nor any hint of divine approval or disapproval for any action in this narrative. The narrative does not depict any deity, and any representative of a deity. The transition in government is thus not explained through an appeal to divine authority, unlike other narratives in the Books of Kings.

Robin Gallaher Branch has observed that the Biblical text uses the term "'ebed" (slave, servant) in reference to Zimri's social position before rising to the throne, rather than the term "mesharet" (free servant) which was often used for military officials serving the Hebrew monarchs. In his view, this suggests that Zimri may have been a literal slave who was entrusted with a military position. Zimri's relatively high-ranking military position suggests that he had sufficient "brawn, brute force, and technical skill" to serve in this position.

In the biblical narrative, Elah behaves similarly to his distant predecessor David. David remained in his capital Jerusalem during wartime operations, choosing to stay away from the front lines. David entrusted the leadership of his army to Joab and devoted his own time to committing adultery with a married woman, Bathsheba. Following David's precedent, Elah entrusted the leadership of his army to Omri, and stayed away from the front lines. He devoted his own time to alcohol drinking and attending parties. The behavior seems intended to prevent the kings from risking their own lives in war, and to use their soldiers to handle life-threatening situations. Yet, this behavior gave Zimri the opportunity to assassinate Elah, in the absence of most of the royal army.

Zimri was not the only Biblical character to commit suicide. The group of other Biblical suicide victims includes Saul, Ahitophel, and Judas Iscariot.

While the Biblical narrative depicts Zimri's boldness and willingness to take decisive action, his short reign exhibits only one outstanding skill of this monarch: Zimri was a "proficient killer". Branch observes that the narrative implies that Zimri lacked administrative skills. He connects Zimri to a passage of the Book of Proverbs (30:21–22) which disparages servants who become kings, apparently because their powerful position makes them "excessively pretentious, arrogant, and disagreeable". Such behaviour by Zimri could explain why he lacked sufficient popular support in his conflict with Omri.

== Legacy ==
The name Zimri became a byword for a traitor who murdered his master. When Jehu led a bloody military revolt to seize the throne of Israel, killed both Jehoram king of Israel and Ahaziah king of Judah, and entered the citadel of Jezreel to execute Queen Jezebel, she greeted him with the words: "Is it peace, Zimri, you murderer of your master?" (2 Kings 9:31). In John Dryden's Absalom and Achitophel, the character of Zimri stands for the Duke of Buckingham.

Zimri (king) Contemporary King of Judah: Asa
Regnal titles
Preceded by Elah	King of Israel; 885 BCE	Succeeded by Omri
