= House of Baasha =

10th-century BCE dynasty of the Kingdom of Israel

The House of Baasha or Baasha dynasty was the second reigning dynasty of the Northern Kingdom of Israel. They are depicted in the first of the Books of Kings. Their estimated reign is placed in the late 10th century BCE and early 9th century BCE.

== Reign ==
This dynasty was reportedly the second dynasty of the Kingdom of Israel, succeeding the House of Jeroboam. The eponymous dynasty founder was Baasha of Israel, son of Ahijah and member of the Tribe of Issachar. He rose to the throne as a usurper, after assassinating his predecessor Nadab of Israel. Baasha also killed all known descendants of the House of Jeroboam. He reportedly reigned for 24 years and was succeeded by his son Elah. Elah reigned for 2 years and was eventually assassinated by his successor Zimri. Zimri had served Elah, as the captain of his chariots. Elah was reportedly ambushed and killed while in a drunken stupor.

Zimri reportedly managed to kill Elah's entire family and Elah's friends, following the orders of the prophet Jehu. Zimri had an ephemeral reign of 7 days. His reign was not widely recognized, and his opponents elected Omri as a rival king. Omri besieged Zimri's house, and Zimri committed suicide by setting his own palace on fire. The House of Baasha was then succeeded by a new dynasty, the Omrides.

== Analysis ==
The Kingdom of Israel survived for about two centuries. During this period, the Books of Kings mention 9 occasions where the throne of the kingdom was captured by usurpers. Among these 9 usurpers, only Omri and Jehu managed to establish relatively stable and long-lived dynasties. Both the House of Jeroboam and the House of Baasha were only represented by two generations of kings, while 4 of the usurpers were succeeded by someone not related to them.

The Deuteronomist redactor of the Books of Kings considered the kings Nadab and Elah as legitimate heirs to the throne, as each of them succeeded their father on the throne. The language of the Deuteronomist instead stigmatizes each usurper, for the conspiracies which elevated them to the throne. The dynastic principle of succession seems to have been clearly understood. This explains why the usurpers had to eliminate the heirs of the previous dynasties, in an effort to solidify their own hold on the throne.

Baasha seems to have orchestrated his coup d'état at a time when the House of Jeroboam was relatively weak, following unsuccessful wars against Shishak and Abijah of Judah, and territorial losses. The fall of the House of Baasha seems to have been a consequence of their own military weakness, as it followed lost unsuccessful wars against Asa of Judah and Ben-Hadad I.

In the narrative of the Books of Kings, new and inexperienced monarchs often had to face prospective usurpers in the early years of their reign. The successful usurpations represent cases where the legitimate king could not survive this power struggle. The short reigns of both Nadab and Elah are among these cases in the narrative.

Most of the usurpers in the narrative of the Kings of Israel were depicted as military men. Zimri was a commander of the chariots, Omri and Jehu were both army commanders, and Pekah was another king's aide-de-camp. The military background of Baasha is not explicit in the text, though he reportedly killed Nadab within the king's own military camp. Which would indicate that Baasha was a soldier or officer in Nadab's army. These usurpers of military background were evidently able to mobilize military forces in support of their respective coups. Their perceived competence as war-leaders was likely their main qualification for the position of king, as leadership during war was among the main duties of an Israelite king.

== See also ==
- House of Gadi
- House of Jehu
- House of Jeroboam
- House of Zimri
- Omride Dynasty
