= Jehu (prophet) =

Biblical prophet and son of Hanani

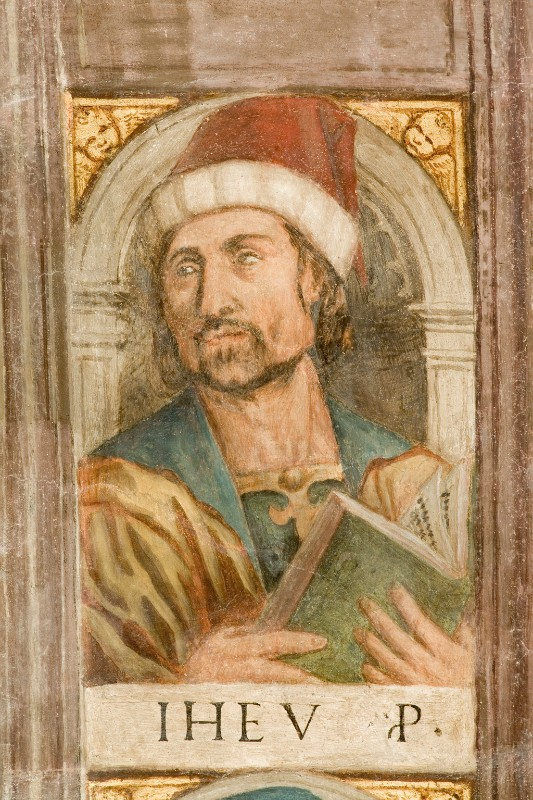
Portrait of the Prophet Jehu by Girolamo Tessari in Padova, Church of St. Francesco

Jehu (UK: /ˈdʒiːhjuː/, US: /ˈdʒiːhuː/; Hebrew: יֵהוּא Yēhūʾ, "Yah is He") son of Hanani was a prophet mentioned in the Hebrew Bible, who was active during the 9th century BC.

== Biblical account ==
According to the Bible, Jehu condemned Baasha, king of Israel, and the House of Baasha (1 Kings 16:7), accusing him of leading the people into the sin of idolatry like his predecessor Jeroboam. Jehu foretold that:

surely [God] will take away the posterity of Baasha and the posterity of his house, and ... will make your house like the house of Jeroboam the son of Nebat. The dogs shall eat whoever belongs to Baasha and dies in the city, and the birds of the air shall eat whoever dies in the fields.

His words were fulfilled in the reign of Elah, Baasha's son, when the traitor Zimri assassinated Elah and murdered all of Baasha's family and associates. (1 Kings 16:1,7,12)

Jehu also challenged Jehoshaphat, king of Judah. Jehoshaphat's alliance with Ahab ended in the latter's death at the Battle of Ramoth-Gilead. Jehoshaphat returned safely, but Jehu rebuked him for helping the wicked king Ahab. He went on to say that nevertheless the Lord found good in the king, as he had removed the Asherah poles from the land and set his heart to seek God. (2 Chronicles 19:2–3)

== Family ==
Hanani, Jehu's father, was also a prophet, who rebuked king Asa of Judah for entering into a league with Ben-Hadad I, king of Syria, against the northern kingdom of Israel (2 Chronicles 16:7–10).
