= House of Zimri =

Short lived Israelite dynasty

The House of Zimri or the Zimri dynasty was a short-lived reigning dynasty of the Northern Kingdom of Israel, as well as the kingdom's third reigning dynasty. It is depicted in the first of the Books of Kings, where it represents a transitional period between the reigns House of Baasha and the Omrides.

The House mainly consists of the king Zimri, who lost a civil war against Omri and committed suicide by self-immolation. In addition, Zimri's successor Tibni has been suggested to be his kinsman or his sibling.

== See also ==
- House of Baasha
- House of Gadi
- House of Jehu
- House of Jeroboam
- Omride Dynasty
