= 880s BC =

Decade

This article concerns the period 889 BC – 880 BC.

== Events ==
- 887 BC—Soshenq II succeeds Osorkon I as king of Egypt.
- 885 BC—Takelot I succeeds Soshenq II as king of Egypt.
- 885 BC—King Yi of Zhou, son of King Yih, is restored to the throne.
- 885 BC—Zimri king of Israel assassinates Elah and rules for 7 days. After committing suicide, The people pick Omri as their king while others pick Tibni.
- 883 BC—Ashurnasirpal II succeeds his father Tukulti-Ninurta II as king of Assyria.
- 881 BC—Tibni the son of Ginath dies and Omri succeeds him.
- 880 BC—Ashurnasirpal moves the Assyrian royal capital to Kalhu (modern Nimrud, Iraq). Human-headed winged lion (lamassu) gateway supports from the palace date from this period to 859 BC.

== Significant people ==
- Shalmaneser III, king of Assyria, is born (approximate date).
- Ahaziah, king of Israel, is born (approximate date).
- Jehoram, king of Judah, is born (approximate date).
