= Hanani =

Biblical character

The word Hanani (Hebrew: חנני Ḥănānî) means "God has gratified me" or "God is gracious".

Hanani is the name of five men mentioned in the Hebrew Bible:

- One of the sons of Heman (1 Chronicles 25:4, 25).
- A "seer" or prophet who was sent to rebuke king Asa of Judah for entering into a league with Ben-Hadad I, king of Syria, against the northern kingdom of Israel.

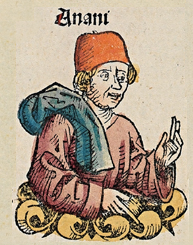
Anani depicted in Nuremberg Chronicles (1493)

Hanani was imprisoned in stocks by Asa (2 Chronicles 16:7-10). This Hanani was also probably the father of the prophet Jehu, who rebuked Baasha, king of the northern kingdom (1 Kings 16:1-4, 7) and Jehoshaphat, king of the southern kingdom (2 Chronicles 19:1-3). The Pulpit Commentary suggests both "belonged to the Kingdom of Judah". Hanani's criticism of Asa's treaty with Syria does not appear in the parallel narrative in 1 Kings 15. Hanani would appear to have had a group of supporters who shared his criticism or disapproved of his arrest, whose protests were also "crushed" by Asa.

- A member of the priestly family of Immer, listed in Ezra 10:20 as having married a foreign wife.
- Probably a brother of Nehemiah (Nehemiah 1:2; 7:2), who reported to him the melancholy condition of Jerusalem. Nehemiah afterwards appointed him to have charge of the city gates.
- A Levite priest and musician who participated in the procession arranged by Nehemiah at the inauguration of Jerusalem's wall. (Nehemiah 12:31-36)
