= House of Gadi =

The House of Gadi was the seventh dynasty of kings of the Northern Kingdom of Israel. The dynasty is also called the House of Menahem, after its founder. The dynasty lasted for only twelve years and ruled from Israel's then-capital of Samaria. The dynasty is so named because Menahem was the son of Gadi.

Two kings of Israel came from the dynasty - Menahem and Pekahiah. Menahem became king of Israel in the thirty-ninth year of the reign of Azariah, king of Judah. He reigned in Israel for ten years. He was succeeded by his son Pekahiah. Pekahiah became king in the fiftieth year of Azariah's reign.

After a reign of two years, Pekahiah was assassinated by Pekah ben Remaliah - a captain from his own army - with the help of fifty men from Gilead. Pekah succeeded Pekahiah as king. Pekah's dynasty is known as the House of Remaliah.

== See also ==
- History of ancient Israel and Judah
- House of Baasha
- House of Jehu
- House of Jeroboam
- House of Zimri
- Omride Dynasty
