= Azubah (mother of Jehoshaphat) =

Biblical character

Azubah is a Biblical name meaning "desolation".

According to the Hebrew Bible, Azubah was the wife of King Asa and the mother of King Jehoshaphat of Israel. She was the daughter of Shilhi. (1 Kings 22:42, 2 Chronicles 20:31)
