= House of Jehu =

Ruling dynasty of the kingdom of Israel (c. 841–750 BCE)

The House of Jehu or Jehu dynasty was the fifth reigning dynasty of the Kingdom of Israel, as well as the longest lasting dynasty in the kingdom's history. They are depicted in both of the Books of Kings. Their estimated reign is placed from the 9th century to the 8th century BCE. The dynasty was founded by its namesake, King Jehu. The dynasty's rule ended with the murder of King Zechariah by Shallum in c. 752 BCE.

== Reign ==
The dynasty is named after its founder Jehu. His immediate predecessor was Jehoram of Israel of the House of Omri. Jehoram was wounded in battle during a campaign against the rival state of Aram-Damascus. Jehoram retreated to the city of Jezreel in order to recover from his wounds, but Jehu attacked and killed him there. Jehu also killed Jehoram's ally, Ahaziah of Judah.

Jehu was reportedly anointed as king by the prophet Elijah (1 Kings 19:16). According to the Books of Chronicles, Jehu was authorized to eliminate the descendants of his predecessor Ahab and all the priests of the god Baal (2 Chronicles 22:7). Jehu continued the worship of the golden calves at the holy places of Bethel and Dan (2 Kings 10:28-31). The Book of Kings accuses Jehu of idolatry. The God Yahweh Himself proclaimed that four generations of Jehu's descendants would hold the throne of Israel, but then the dynasty would lose the throne as punishment for Jehu's idolatry (2 Kings 15:12). Jehu reigned for 28 years.

Jehu was succeeded by his son Joacaz. Joacaz was a vassal to the monarchs of Aram-Damascus. He was reportedly a poor administrator, and the Book of Kings associates his reign with "great suffering" for his kingdom. He reigned for 17 years.

Joacaz was succeeded by his son Joás. Joás is credited with victories over the kingdom of Aram-Damascus, and with freeing the Kingdom of Israel from its subordination to the monarchs of Damascus. Joás was reportedly allied to the prophet Elisha, who had promised him victory over Aram-Damascus. Joás is mentioned mourning Elisha's death. Jehoash reigned for 16 years.

Joás was succeeded by his son Jeroboam II. Jeroboam is depicted as a very competent leader for Israel. He dominated the Arameans of Syria and reclaimed territories that the Kingdom of Israel had lost in previous conflicts. Israel's political power increased during his reign. Jeroboam reigned for 41 years.

Jeroboam was succeeded by his son Zechariah of Israel, the last monarch of the House of Jehu. Zechariah only reigned for 6 months. He was assassinated by Shallum of Israel, who then claimed the throne of Israel for himself.

== Ancestry ==
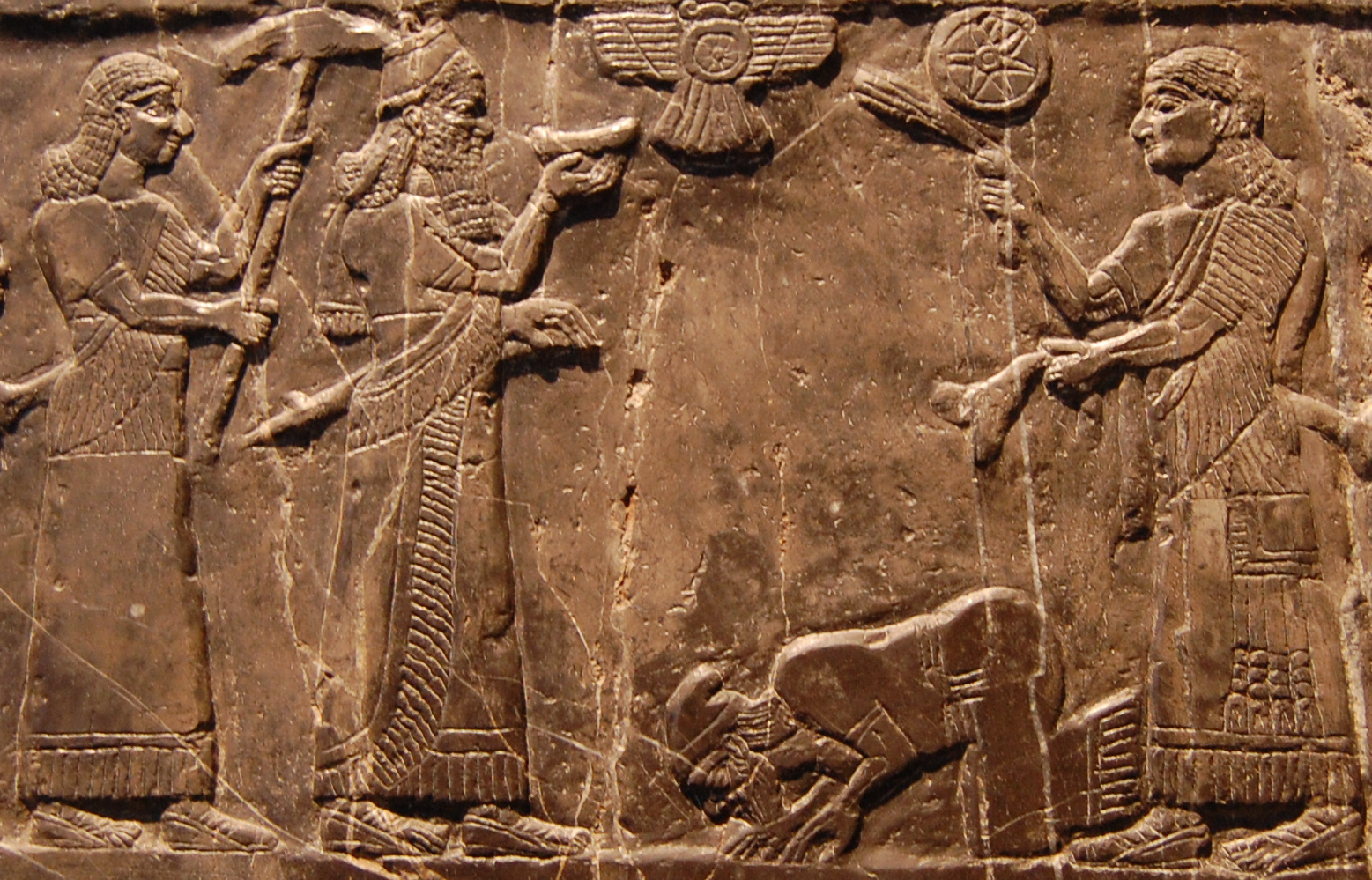
The tribute of Northern Kingdom King "Jehu of the people of the land of Omri" (Akkadian: 𒅀𒌑𒀀 𒈥 𒄷𒌝𒊑𒄿) as depicted on the Black Obelisk of Shalmaneser III, 841-840 BCE. This is "the only portrayal we have in ancient Near Eastern art of an Israelite or Judaean monarch".

Jehu is mentioned in the inscriptions of Shalmaneser III, King of the Neo-Assyrian Empire (reigned 859–824 BCE). The inscriptions identify Jehu as a "son of (the land of) Omri", an apparent member of the House of Omri. In the Assyrian inscriptions, the designation "son of" is used to connect various rulers to the ancestral founders of each dynasty, not to their actual fathers, and the formula generally calls Jehu a son of the House of Omri, and not a son of Omri himself.

One modern interpretation of the Assyrian inscriptions is that Jehu was a descendant of a cadet branch of the House of Omri, which would explain his high-ranking position in the army of Israel. The second of the Books of Kings identifies Jehu as a son of Jehoshaphat and a grandson of Nimshi. His great-grandfather is not mentioned in the text. Nadav Na'aman concedes that Jehu could have been a kinsman of his predecessor Jehoram of Israel, but he considers likely that Shalmaneser had a different motive for apparently legitimizing Jehu as an heir to the House of Omri.

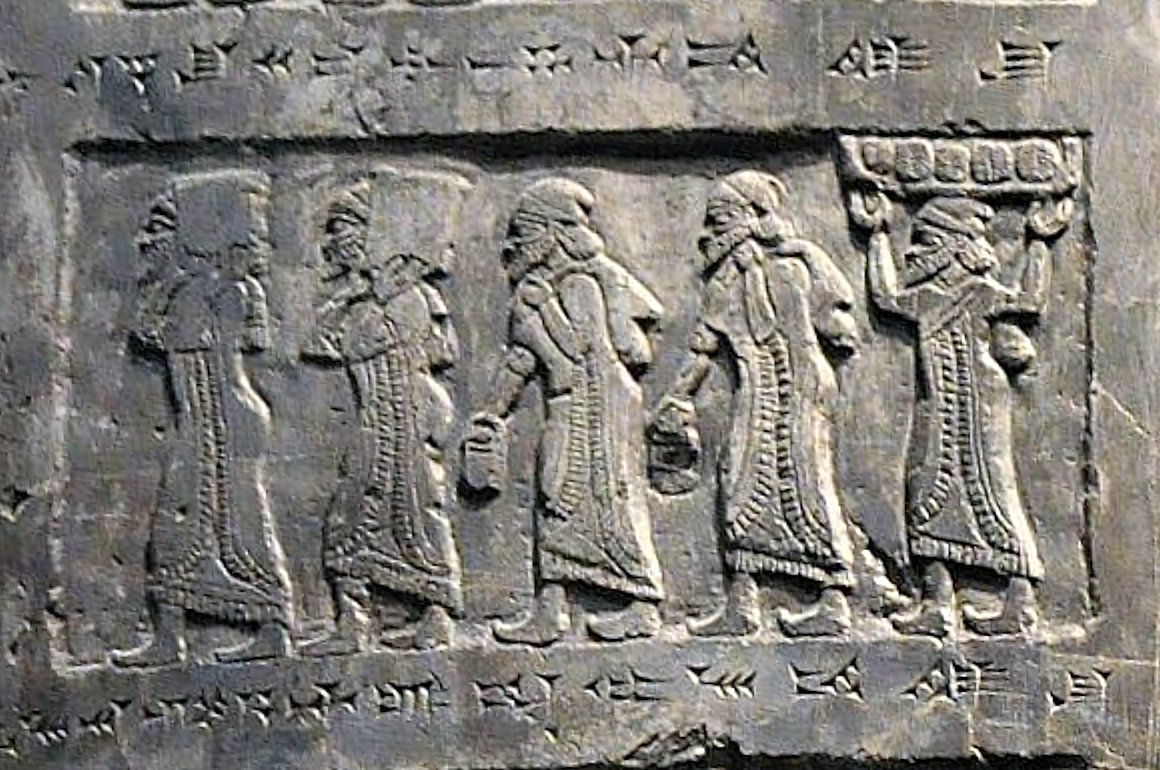
Black Obelisk, part of the gift-bearing Jewish delegation.

Shalmaneser's inscriptions describe as usurpers the kings Hazael of Aram-Damascus, Surri of Patina, and Marduk-bêl-usâte of Karduniaš. All three of them were Shalmaneser's enemies, and their negative portrayals were used to justify the Neo-Assyrian Empire's wars against them. Surri's ancestry is unknown, Hazael was apparently a descendant of a previous royal dynasty, and Marduk-bêl-usâte had revolted against his brother Marduk-zakir-shumi I. This means that Marduk-bêl-usâte was a member of the same dynasty as his brother. The royal ancestry of these usurpers was deliberately ignored by Assyrian propaganda.

Shalmaneser had reasons to legitimize Jehu's regime. Jehu's predecessors Ahab and Jehoram were enemies of the Neo-Assyrian Empire, and had repeatedly participated in the military coalitions against Shalmaneser himself. On the other hand, Jehu abandoned this anti-Assyrian policy. He formally surrendered to Shalmaneser and paid tribute to Shalmaneser as his vassal. Shalmaneser had every reason to favorably depict Jehu and to acknowledge him as a "son" of the previous dynasty.

Amitai Baruchi-Unna considers it likely that Jehu actually was a descendant of Omri, and that his recorded hostility towards the so-called "House of Ahab" represents a fight for the throne between rival branches of the House of Omri. Both Books of Kings and the second of the Books of Chronicles consistently use the patronymic "son of Nimshi" for Jehu, suggesting that Nimshi himself was a famous figure of "high-lineage".

Baruchi-Unna suggests that Nimshi was a son of King Omri and a brother of King Ahab. Jehu's father, Jehoshaphat, would consequently be a first cousin to Ahab's children: Ahaziah of Israel, Jehoram of Israel, and Athaliah, Queen regnant of the Kingdom of Judah. Among the members of this extended House of Omri, the names Ahaziah, Jehoram, Athaliah, and Jehoshaphat are all theophoric names incorporating the name of Yahweh, while Omri, Ahab, and Nimshi make no reference to the deity. This may be reflective of the different religious tendencies among the first and second generations of the royal family from the Yahweh-worshipping third generation.

On Jehu's background, the Book of Kings indicate that he had enjoyed the favor of his predecessors. Jehu had served as personal bodyguard under Ahab, and as a general officer under Jehoram. Narratives concerning previous kings of Israel depict them appointing their own kinsmen in positions requiring such a high level of trust. Saul had appointed his cousin Abner as the general of his army. David had appointed his nephews (sister's sons) Joab and Amasa as the generals of his own army.

== Sources ==
- Baruchi-Unna, Amitai (2017), Jehuites, Ahabites, and Omrides, Journal for the Study of the Old Testament, doi:10.1177/0309089216661177, S2CID 159833033
- Chase, Randal S. (2010), "Israel Is Divided and Sinks into Apostasy and Captivity", Old Testament Study Guide, Pt. 2: Deuteronomy to Solomon, Plain and Precious Publishing, ISBN 978-1937901288
- Naʼaman, Nadav (2005), "Jehu son of Omri:Legitimizing a Loyal Vassal by His Lord", Ancient Israel and Its Neighbors: Interaction and Counteraction, Eisenbrauns, ISBN 9781575061085

== See also ==
- House of Baasha
- House of Gadi
- House of Jeroboam
- House of Zimri
- Omride Dynasty
