= Omrides =

Iron-Age ruling dynasty of Israel

House of Omri (Omrides)
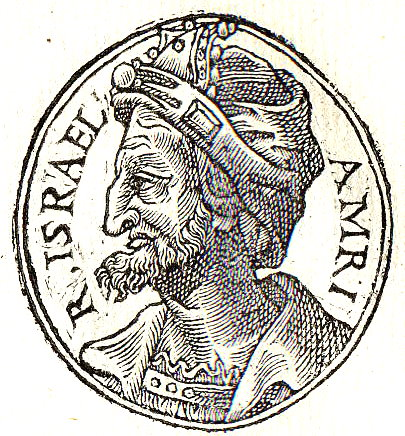
- Country: Kingdom of Israel (northern); Kingdom of Judah (southern)
- Founder: Omri
- Final ruler: Jehoram
- Titles: King of Israel; Queen of Judah

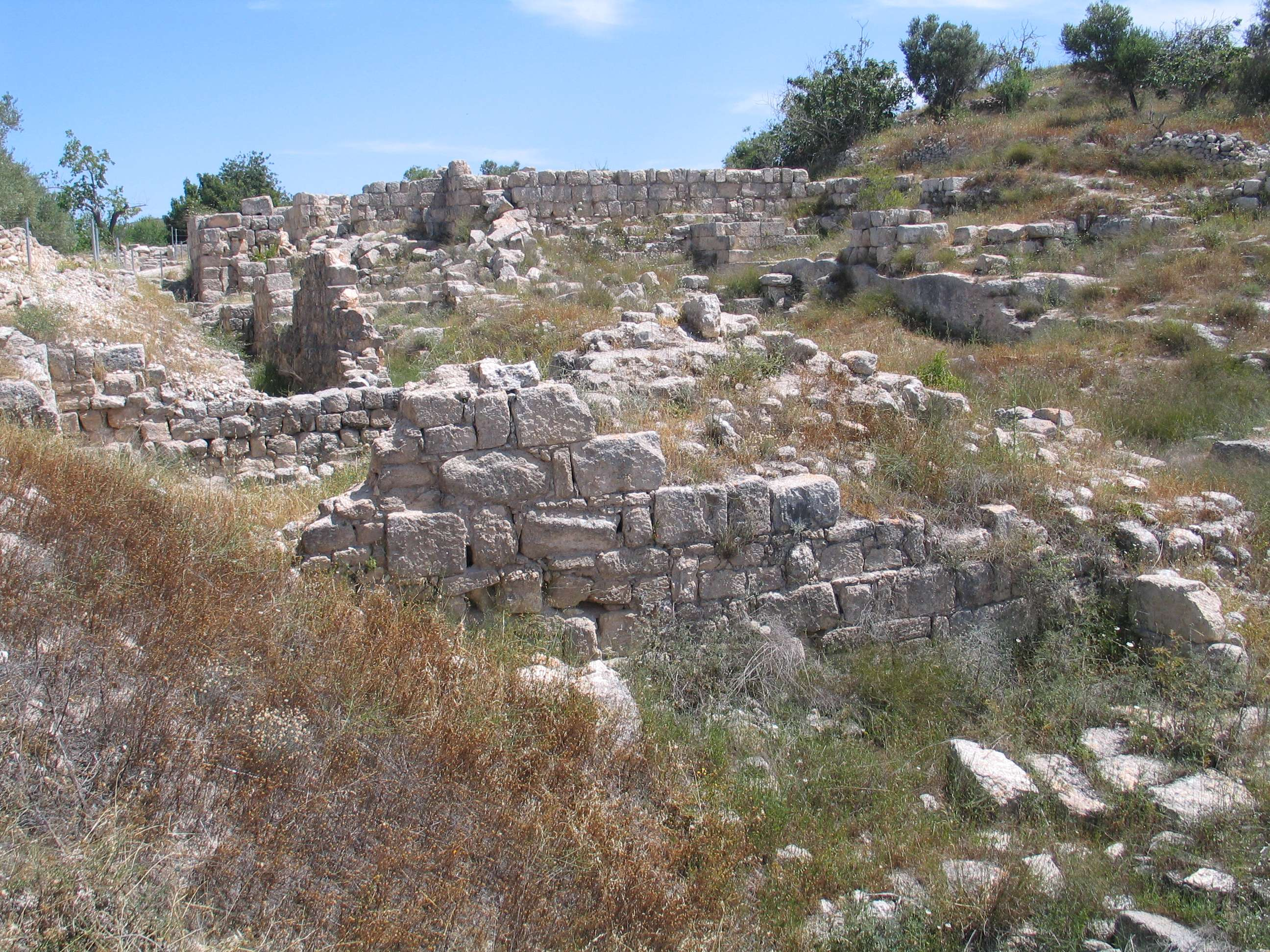
Ruins of the Omride palace in Samaria, modern-day Sebastia

The Omride dynasty, Omrides or House of Omri (Hebrew: בֵּית עָמְרִי, romanized: Bēt ʿOmrī; Akkadian: 𒂍𒄷𒌝𒊑𒄿, romanized: bīt-Ḫûmrî) were the fourth ruling dynasty of the Kingdom of Israel, which were founded by King Omri. The dynasty's rule ended with the murder of Jehoram of Israel by Jehu in c. 841 BCE.

Five Assyrian records are known to refer to either "Land of Omri" or "House of Omri". An archaeological reference to Omri and his unnamed son is found in the Mesha Stele, the only Northwest Semitic inscription known to reference this name. According to the Bible, the Omride rulers of Israel were Omri, Ahab, Ahaziah and Jehoram. Ahab's daughter Athaliah also became queen regnant of the Kingdom of Judah.

== Biblical account ==
Overall, the Bible portrays the Omrides as apostates, who abandoned Yahwism for Baal worship. In terms of foreign policy, they dealt with troublesome neighbors, such as Aram-Damascus and Moab, and allied with the Kingdom of Judah via marriage. But domestically, they established Samaria as the new capital city. Eventually, Jehu revolted against them and fully restored Jeroboam's golden calf cult. The last ruler, Athaliah, survived and usurped the Judean throne. However Jehu, who was the son of Jehoshaphat, and the grandson of Nimshi, could possibly be a great-grandson of Omri (although the latter notion is not supported by the biblical text), which would extend the period of the "House of Omri" for much longer.

=== List of reigning Omrides ===
Most modern historians follow either the older chronologies established by William F. Albright or Edwin R. Thiele, or the newer chronologies of Gershon Galil and Kenneth Kitchen, all of which appear below.

Common name	Regnal Name and style	Albright	Thiele	Galil	Kitchen	Notes
Omri	עמרי מלך ישראל ’Omri, Melekh Yisra’el	876–869 BCE	885–874 BCE	884–873 BCE	886–875 BCE	Reigned over Israel in Samaria for 12 years. Death: natural causes
Ahab	אחאב בן-עמרי מלך ישראל; Ah’av ben ’Omri, Melekh Yisra’el	869–850 BCE	874–853 BCE	873–852 BCE	875–853 BCE	Reigned over Israel in Samaria for 22 years. Death: shot by an archer during the battle at Ramoth Gilead. He died upon his arrival at Samaria.
Ahaziah	אחזיהו בן-אחאב מלך ישראל ’Ahazyahu ben 'Ah’av, Melekh Yisra’el	850–849 BCE	853–852 BCE	852–851 BCE	853–852 BCE	Reigned over Israel in Samaria for 2 years. Death: he fell through the lattice of his upper room and injured himself. Elijah the prophet told him he would never leave his bed and would die on it.
Jehoram; Joram	יורם בן-אחאב מלך ישראל; Yehoram ben ’Ah’av, Melekh Yisra’el	849–842 BCE	852–841 BCE	851–842 BCE	852–841 BCE	Reigned over Israel in Samaria for 12 years. Death: killed by Jehu, the next king of Israel.
Athaliah	עתליה בת-עמרי מלכת יהודה ‘Atalyah bat ‘Omri, Malkat Yehudah	842–837 BCE	841–835 BCE	842–835 BCE	841–835 BCE	Queen Mother, widow of Jehoram and mother of Ahaziah. Reigned over Judah in Jerusalem for 6 years. Death: killed by the troops assigned by Jehoiada the Priest to protect Joash.

=== Religion ===
Biblical scholar Edward Lipiński speculated that "Baal" does not refer to the Phoenician deity but to the "YHWH of Samaria". The pro-Judean authors of the Hebrew Bible conflated them because they considered the latter to be Yahwist heresy. The Mesha Stele likewise mentions the Yahwist orientation of the Omrides ("And Chemosh said to me, Go take Nebo against Israel, and ... and I took it: ... and I took from it the vessels of Jehovah, and offered them before Chemosh."). Royal names (Jehoram, Ahaziah, Athaliah) were theophoric and referred to Yahweh. But there is evidence that "Baal" does not refer to Yahweh, based on Jezebel's royal seal and personal background. Thus, the Omrides promoting Yahweh by integrating imagery from the Ugaritic Baal and Baal-Shamem, which the later biblical prophets accepted, falls in line with early supporters of a monolatrist Yahwism faction appearing in the 9th–8th centuries BCE, during the time of Elijah and Hosea, but their respective depiction of Yahweh still having only marginal impact under Josiah, and not becoming lasting until the exilic and post-exilic period. Characteristics of other deities, such as Asherah and Baal, were selectively absorbed in conceptions of Yahweh.

== Historicity ==
Israel Finkelstein believes the Omrides were responsible for the wealth and empire-building that was famously attributed to David and Solomon. Furthermore, they built and refurbished Samaria, Jezreel, Megiddo and Hazor. He believes these details were omitted in the Hebrew Bible because the authors disapproved of their polytheism.

Christian Frevel argues that the Omrides were responsible for introducing YHWH to the Kingdom of Judah, who viewed YHWH as a patron god of the Judean state. Conversely, Israel contained a plurality of Yahwist cults. This was mostly achieved by Ahab, who gave his children theophoric names whilst expanding in the northern territories and Judah. Hazael’s conquests in Israel forced Ahab’s successors to strengthen ties with Judah, which further spread Yahwism among Judeans. It is possible that Yahwist traditions, including those about the Exodus, were preserved by the Omride family clan. Michael J. Stahl believes the biblical narratives corroborate with this historical reality. For example, Ahab repented to Yahweh after Naboth's death and consulted with Yahwist prophets before warring with Arameans.

== Archaeological evidence ==
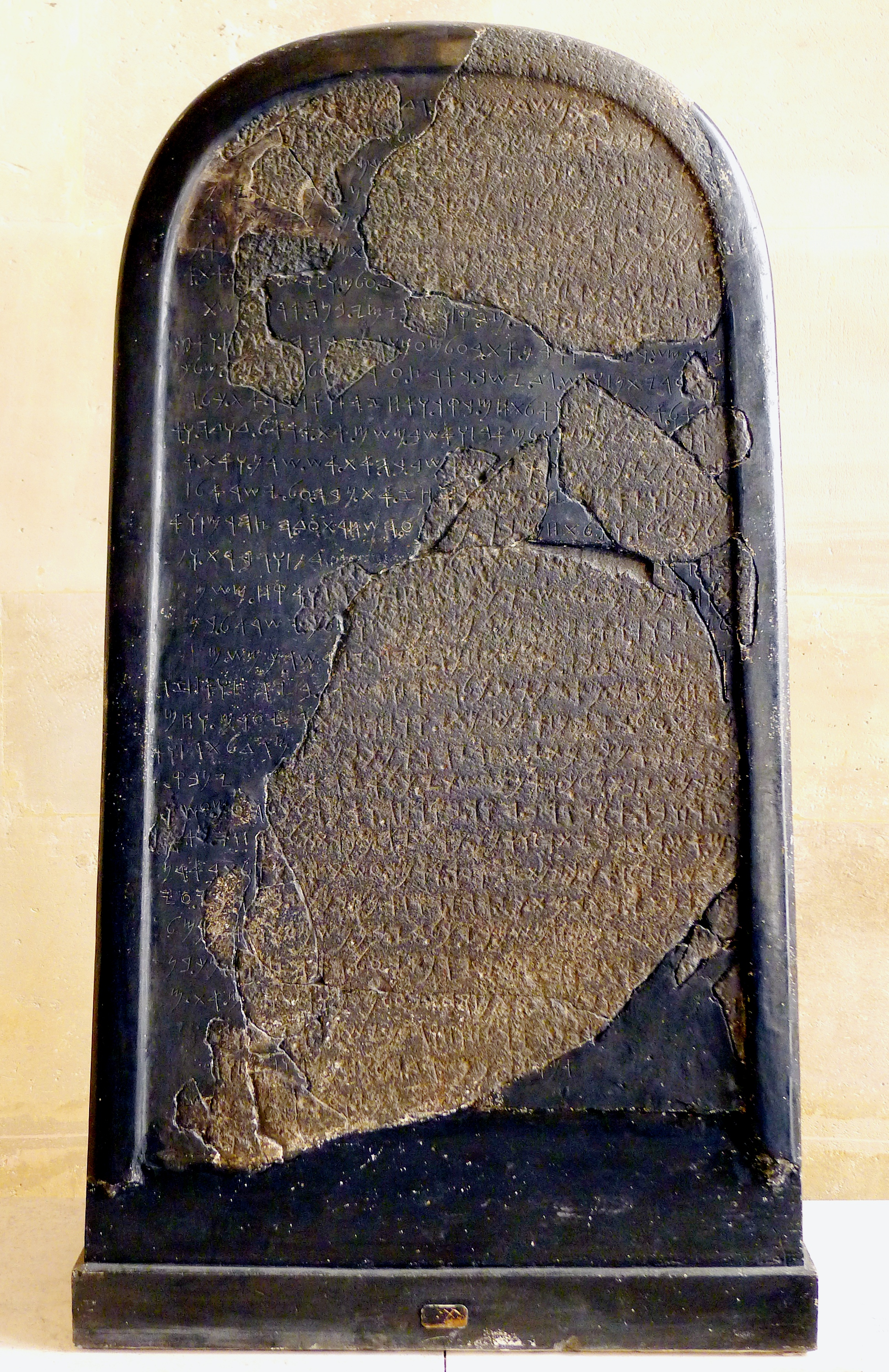
Mesha Stele describes the oppression of Moab by Omri, king of Israel, and the Moabite victory over his unnamed son, probably referring to Ahab

The Mesha Stele bears a Moabite inscription of about 840 BCE by Mesha, ruler of Moab, in which Mesha tells of the oppression of Moab by "Omri king of Israel" and his son after him, and boasts of his own victories over the latter.

Though the Bible claims that Jehu killed the last Omride king Jehoram and his ally King Ahaziah of Judah in a coup about 841 BCE, afterwards going on to destroy most remaining members of the House of Omri, archaeological evidence cast some doubt on this account. The author of the Tel Dan Stele (usually identified as King Hazael of Damascus (c.842–806 BCE)) appears himself to have claimed to have killed the two kings.

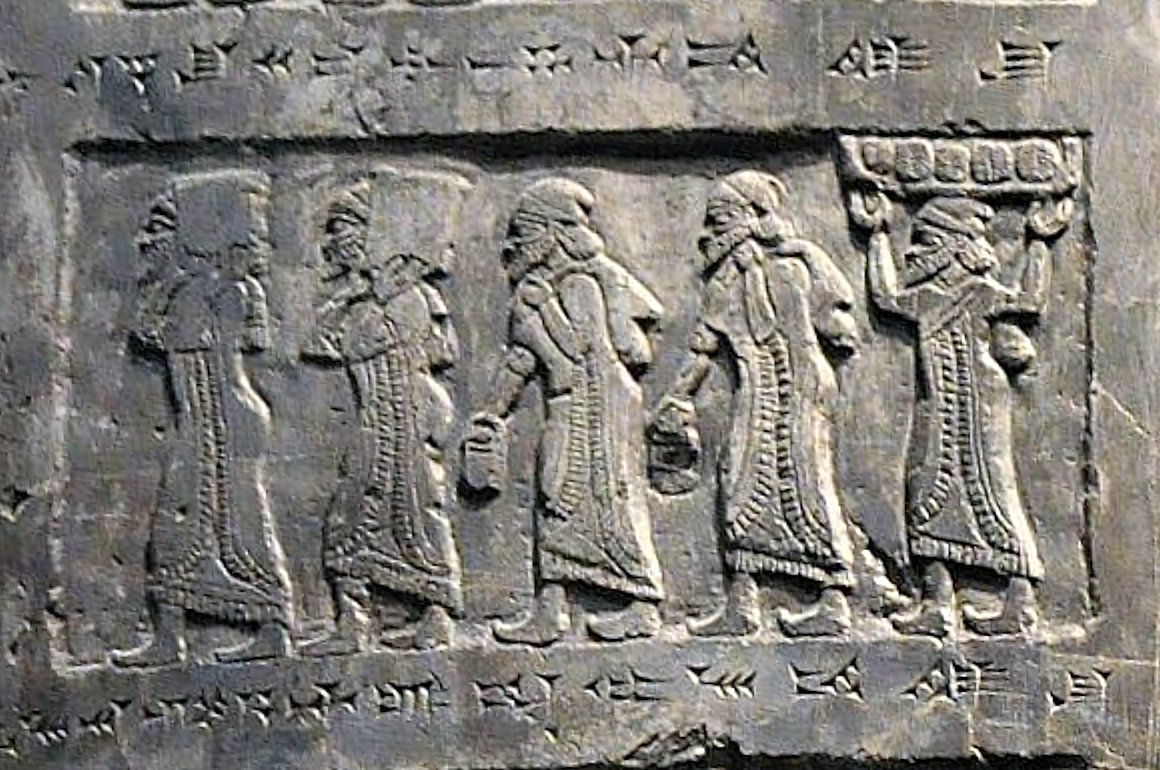
Part of the gift-bearing Israelite delegation of King Jehu, Black Obelisk, 841–840 BCE.

In addition, the Black Obelisk of King Shalmaneser III of Assyria, usually dated to 841-840 BCE, names Jehu as a "son of Omri." (The reign of Jehu is usually given as 841–814 BCE.)

Nevertheless, the reference to "son of Omri" in the Black Obelisk in the expression "Jehu son of Omri" may be a reference to the "House of Omri", which is believed to be the Assyrian name for the Kingdom of Israel. Assyrian kings frequently referred to Omri's successors as belonging to the "House of Omri" (Bit Hu-um-ri-a). However, none of these later references are aimed at persons, but either to the land or the people. Only in relation to Jehu is mar Hu-um-ri-i, "son of Omri", used. and as this is in fact the first time that Omri as a founder is mentioned, it can not be argued that this was an established tradition and it would be very odd to do so just after Jehu had eliminated the entire house of Omri. So it seems that Jehu was in fact (or styled himself as) a descendent of Omri.

=== List of proposed Assyrian references to the House of Omri ===
The table below lists all the historical references to Omri in Assyrian records.

Assyrian King	Inscription	Year	Transliteration	Translation
Shalmaneser III	Black Obelisk, Calah Fragment, Kurba'il Stone, Ashur Stone	841 BCE	mar Hu-um-ri-i	"of the people of the land of Omri" (Note: Historically translated as "son of Omri")
Adad-nirari III	Nimrud Slab	803 BCE	KUR Bīt-Hu-um-ri-i	"the land of the house of Omri"
Tiglath-Pileser III	ND 4301 + 4305, III R 10,2	731 BCE	KUR E Hu-um-ri-a	"the land of the house of Omri"
Sargon II	Palace Door, Small Summary Inscription, Cylinder Inscription, Bull Inscription (Note: All four items share the same inscription)	720 BCE	mat KUR Bit-Hu-um-ri-a	"all the land of the house of Omri"

== See also ==
- Baasha Dynasty
- History of Ancient Israel
- House of Gadi
- Jehu Dynasty
- Jeroboam Dynasty
- Zimri Dynasty

== Sources ==
- Albertz, Rainer (1994). A History of Israelite Religion, Volume I: From the Beginnings to the End of the Monarchy. Westminster John Knox Press. ISBN 978-0-664-22719-7.
- Cornell, Collin, ed. (2021). Divine Doppelgängers: YHWH's Ancient Look-Alikes. Penn State Press. ISBN 978-1-64602-093-5.
- Smith, Mark S. (2002). The Early History of God: Yahweh and the Other Deities in Ancient Israel (2nd ed.). Eerdmans. ISBN 978-0-8028-3972-5.
- Smith, Mark S. (2017). "YHWH's Original Character: Questions about an Unknown God". In Van Oorschot, Jürgen; Witte, Markus (eds.). The Origins of Yahwism. Beihefte zur Zeitschrift für die alttestamentliche Wissenschaft. Vol. 484. De Gruyter. ISBN 978-3-11-042538-3.
