= House of Jeroboam =

The House of Jeroboam or Jeroboam dynasty was the first reigning dynasty of the Northern Kingdom of Israel. They are depicted in the first of the Books of Kings. Their estimated reign is placed in the 10th century BCE.

The house is named after its founder, the king Jeroboam, who reportedly had a reign of 22 years. Jeroboam was succeeded by his son Nadab of Israel, who had a short reign of 2 years. Nadab was assassinated by his eventual successor Baasha of Israel, a son of Ahijah and member of the Tribe of Issachar.

Baasha proceeded to exterminate all members of the House of Jeroboam. Baasha was reportedly following instructions from the prophet Ahijah the Shilonite. The Books of Kings mention that no member of the House of Jeroboam was left to breathe.

== See also ==
- House of Baasha
- House of Gadi
- House of Jehu
- House of Zimri
- Omride Dynasty
