= Gibbethon =

Gibbethon or Gibbeton was a biblical city in the land of Canaan.

== In the Hebrew Bible ==
According to the record in the Hebrew Bible, Gibbeton was occupied by the Tribe of Dan after the entry of the Israelites into the Promised Land and was then given to the Tribe of Levi.

According to the Book of Joshua, it was given as a Levitical city to the Kohathites.

However, in 1 Kings 15:27 it was recorded as being a city of the Philistines. Nadab, the second king of the northern Kingdom of Israel, besieged Gibbethon. During the siege, Baasha the son of Ahijah, a member of the tribe of Issachar, killed King Nadab of Israel and made himself king, reigning over the northern kingdom for 24 years.

John James Blunt, in his Undesigned Coincidences in the Writings both of the Old and New Testaments (1882), suggested that "the place had been deserted by the Levites, in the general exodus to Judah, [so] that the Philistines availed themselves of the opportunity to seize and fortify it".

== Identification ==
In the late 19th century, Gibbethon has been identified with al-Majdal, near Ashkelon, and so possibly on the border of Danite Israel and Philistia.

Israeli archaeologist Benjamin Mazar located it in 1960 in a region to the north of the Sorek Valley, possibly at Tel Malot, located northwest of the city of Beit Shemesh and due west of the city of Gezer.
