= Asa of Judah =

King of Judah

Asa
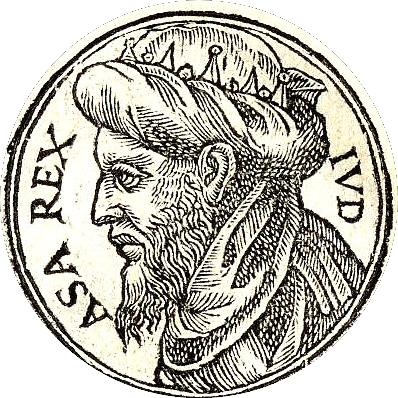
- Asa from Guillaume Rouillé's; Promptuarii Iconum Insigniorum, 1553

King of Judah
- Reign: c. 911 – 870 BCE
- Predecessor: Abijah
- Successor: Jehoshaphat
- Died: 870 BCE
- Spouse: Azubah
- House: House of David
- Father: Abijah

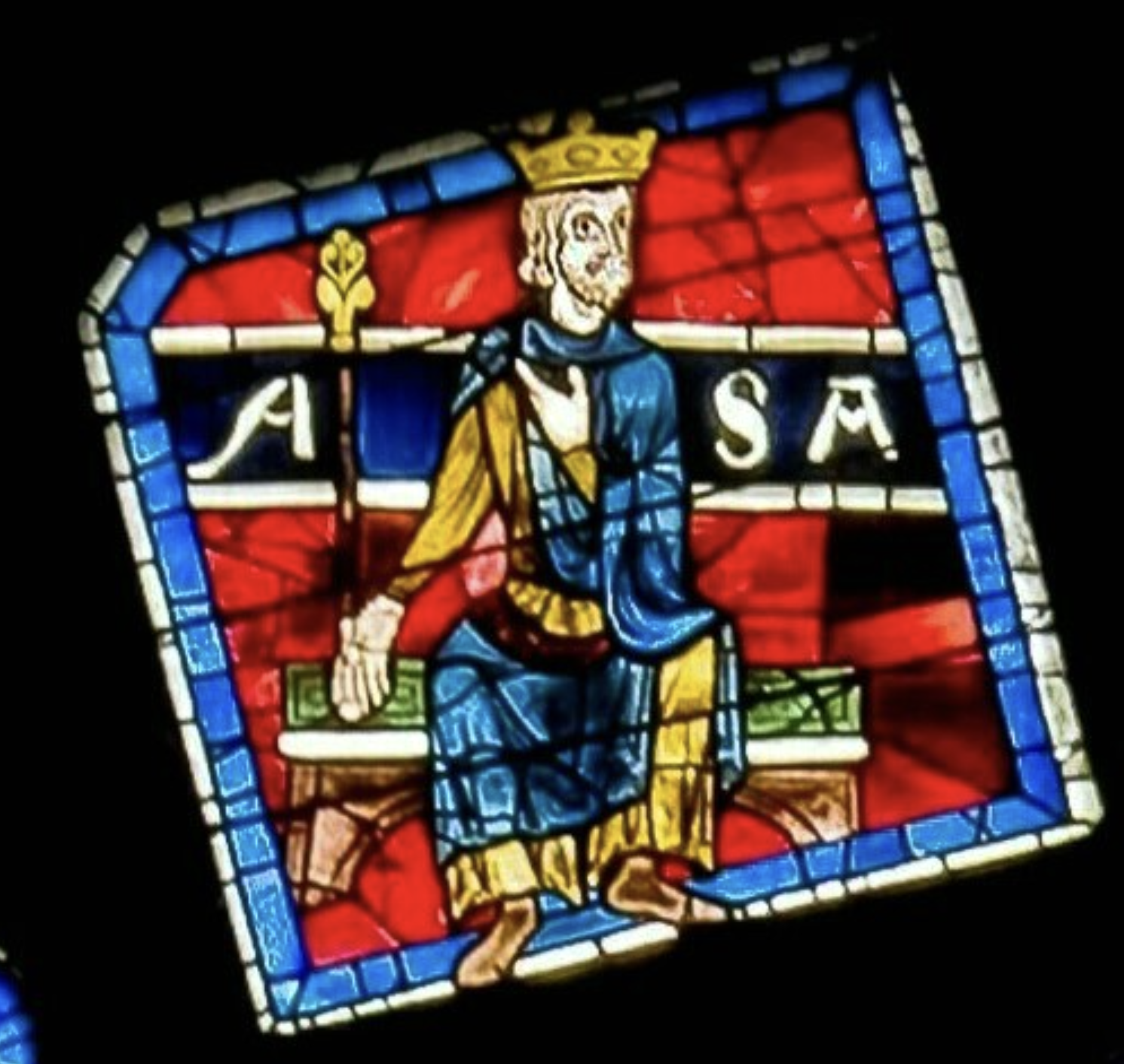
King Asa, from the north rose window of Chartres Cathedral

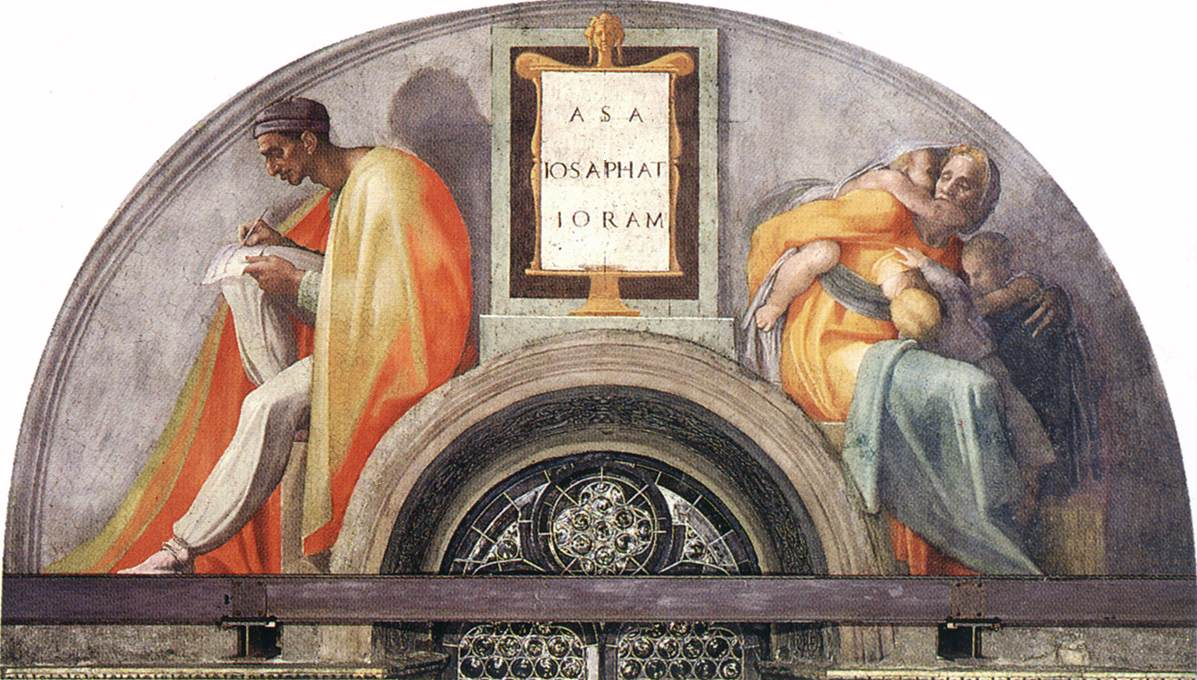
Asa, Jehoshaphat, and Joram, from the Sistine Chapel ceiling.

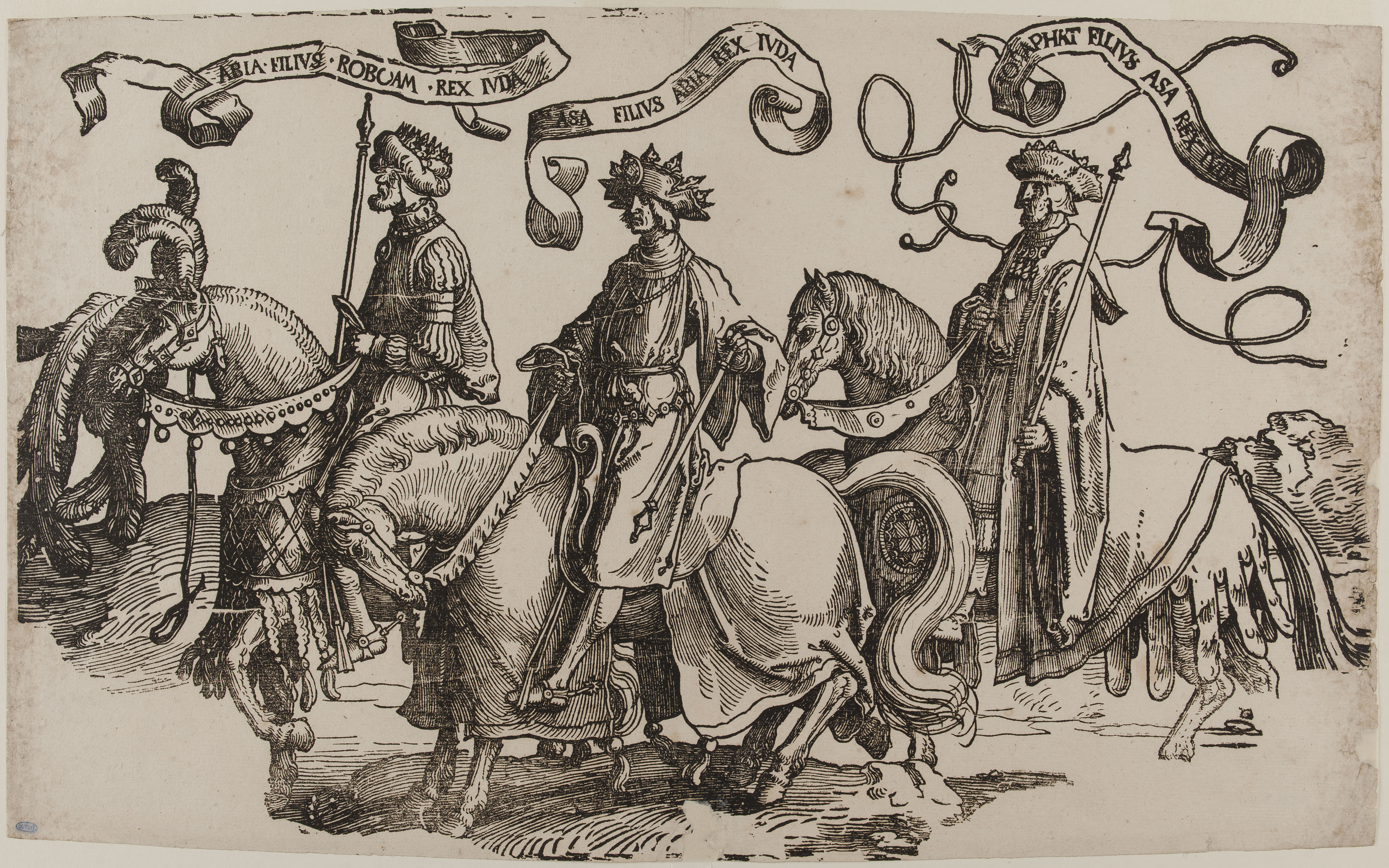
Abijah, Asa, and Jehoshaphat, by Lucas van Leyden

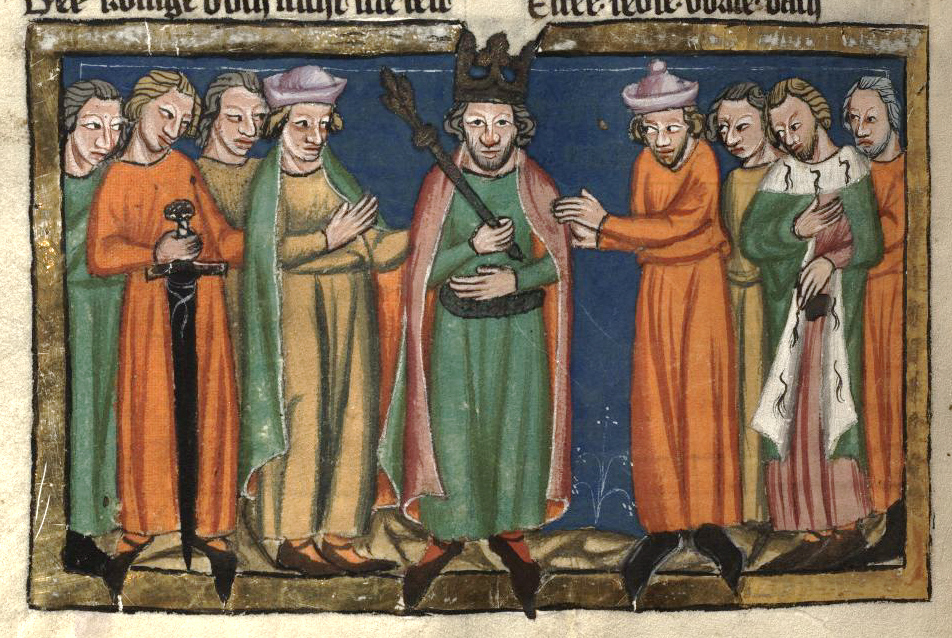
The crowning of Asa, from the Weltchronik Fulda.

Asa (/ˈeɪsə/; Hebrew: אָסָא, Modern: ʾAsaʾ, Tiberian: ʾĀsāʾ; Greek: Ασά; Latin: Asa) was, according to the Hebrew Bible, the third king of the Kingdom of Judah and the fifth king of the House of David. Based on the Biblical chronology, Biblical scholars suggest that he reigned from the late 10th to early 9th century BCE. He was succeeded by Jehoshaphat, his son (by Azubah). According to Edwin R. Thiele's chronology, when Asa became very ill, he made Jehoshaphat coregent. Asa died two years into the coregency.

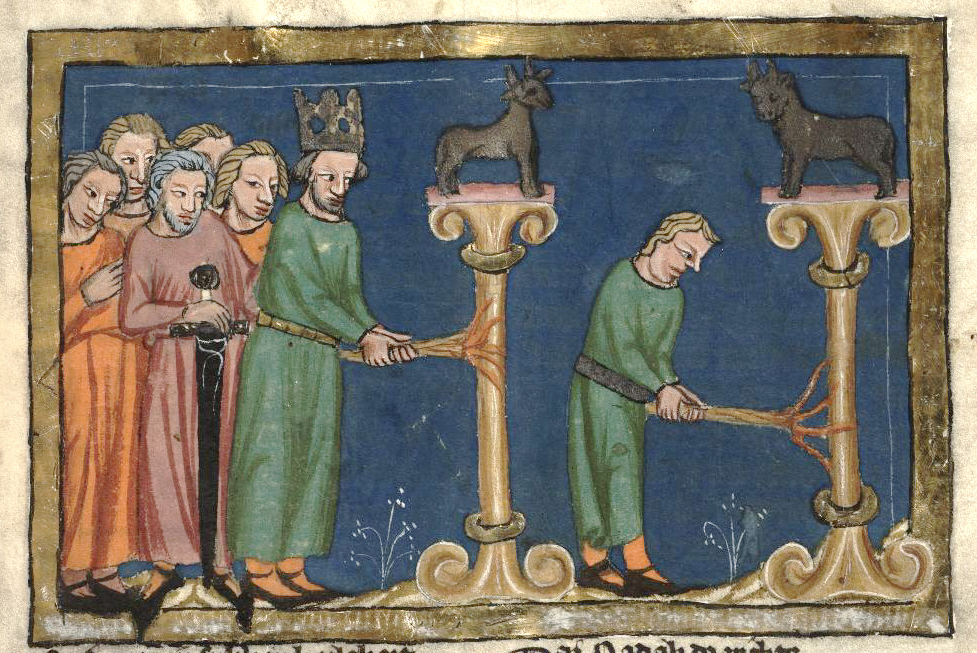
Asa destroys the idols, from the Weltchronik Fulda.

Asa son of Abijah was zealous in maintaining the traditional worship of God, and in rooting out idolatry, with its accompanying immoralities. After concluding a battle with Zerah of Ethiopia in the 10th year of his reign, there was peace in Judah (2 Chronicles 14:1,9) until the 36th year of Asa's reign (2 Chronicles 16:1). In his 36th year, he was confronted by Baasha, king of Israel. He formed an alliance with Ben-Hadad I, king of Aram-Damascus, and using a monetary bribe, convinced him to break his peace treaty with Baasha and invade the Northern Kingdom (2 Chronicles 16:2–6). He died greatly honoured by his people, and was considered for the most part a righteous king. He threw the prophet Hanani in jail and "oppressed some of the people at the same time" (2 Chronicles 16:10). It is also recorded of Asa that in his old age, when afflicted with a foot disease, he "sought not to the Lord, but to the physicians".

== Family ==
Asa is typically understood as the son of Abijam, King of Judah. Some scholars find the biblical accounts of Asa's family background contradictory; however, a study of Hebrew linguistics removes any seeming contradictions. One of the alleged contradictions is that Maacah (or Micaiah or Maachah, Abijah's mother) is sometimes described as the daughter of Absalom, and elsewhere as the daughter of Uriel of Gibeah. Absalom is described as having only one daughter, Tamar. Biblical Hebrew uses the same word for both "daughter" and "granddaughter", removing any contradiction there. Similarly, Maacah initially appears as Abijah's mother, but is subsequently described as the mother of Abijah's son Asa. However, in Hebrew, "mother" and "grandmother" are the same word, once again removing any contradiction. Other scholars, however, think that had Asa's mother not been Maacah, her name would have been given, as his father Abijam had many other wives.

== Purging of idolatry ==
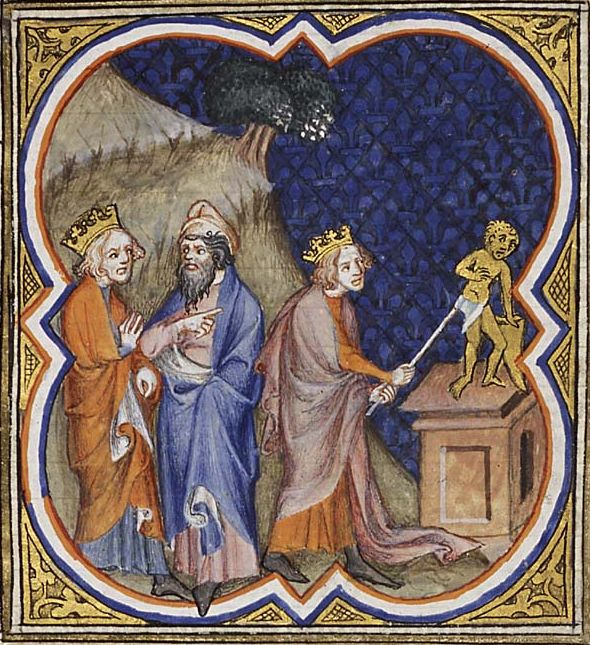
Asa destroying the idols, from the Bible Historiale, 1372.

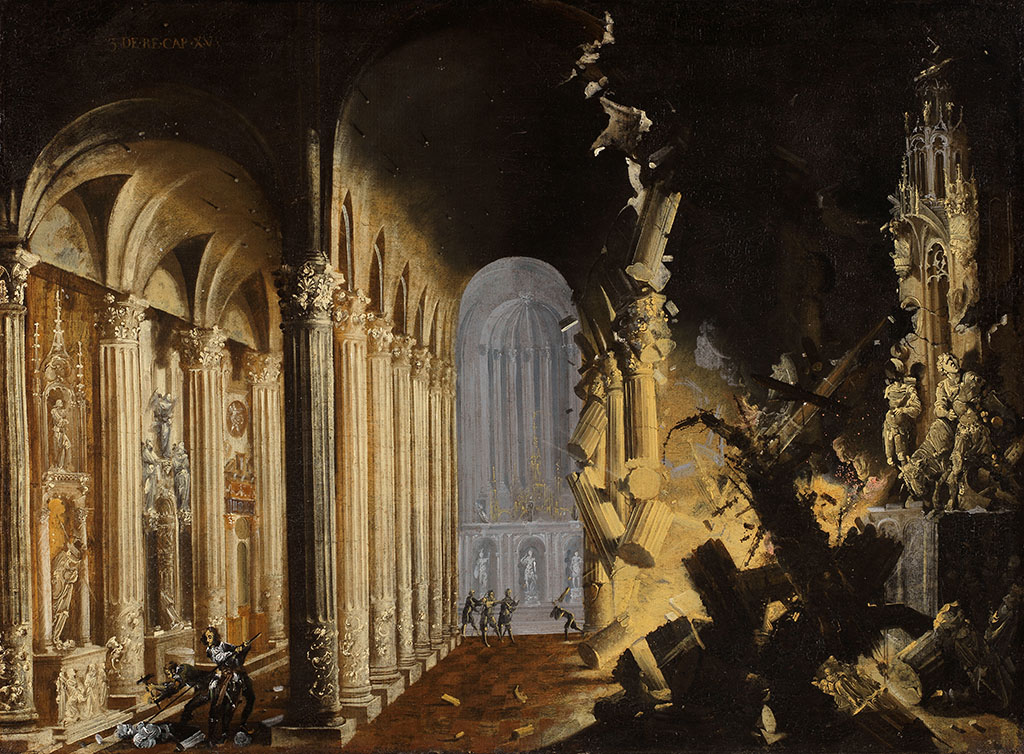
King Asa of Juda Destroying the Idols by François de Nomé

Azariah son of Oded, a wiseman and prophet, exhorted Asa to reinforce strict national observance of The Law given to Moses, and Asa paid heed. He purged the land of foreign religions and false idols and the nation and YHWH entered into a renewed covenant. At this time, the current gəḇīrā, Maʿacah, was deposed for her worship of Asherah and for making an ʾăšērā. This worship was in-line with local beliefs and practices, which were observed by the native peoples, and may or may not have been part of the official state religion. Finally, when the religious transition was completed in Asa's fifteenth year, a great feast was held in Jerusalem at Solomon's Temple (2 Chronicles 15:10–11). At that time, many northerners, particularly from the tribes Ephraim and Manasseh, migrated to the Kingdom of Judah because of the fruitful golden age in Judah, and the internal conflict in Israel after the fall of the dynasty of Jeroboam I.

== Wars and defense projects ==
Taking advantage of 35 years of peace, Asa revamped and reinforced the fortress cities originally built by his grandfather Rehoboam. 2 Chronicles reports that Asa also repelled a raid by the Egyptian-backed chieftain Zerah the Ethiopian, whose million men and 300 chariots were defeated by Asa's 580,000 men in the Valley of Zephath, near Mareshah (2 Chronicles 14:8–15). According to Steven Shawn Tuell, the biblical numbers given in this passage are "completely unrealistic". The Bible does not state whether Zerah was a pharaoh or a general of the army. The Ethiopians were pursued all the way to Gerar, in the coastal plain, where they stopped out of sheer exhaustion. The resulting peace kept Judah free from Egyptian incursions until the time of Josiah, some centuries later.

In Asa's 36th year, King Baasha of Israel attacked the Kingdom of Judah (2 Chronicles 16:1; the Seder Olam and some later commentators take this as the 36th year since the division of the kingdom, not the 36th year of Asa's reign.) Alternatively it could be interpreted as 26th year of Asa's reign and the last year of Baasha's life. Baasha built the fortress of Ramah on the border, less than ten miles from Jerusalem. The result was that the capital was under pressure and the military situation was precarious. Asa took gold and silver from the Temple and the palace of the king and sent them to Ben-Hadad I, king of Aram-Damascus, in exchange for the Damascene king terminating his peace treaty with Baasha. As a consequence, Ben-Hadad I attacked Ijon, Dan, and many important cities of the tribe of Naphtali, and Baasha was forced to withdraw from Ramah. Asa tore down the unfinished fortress and used its raw materials to fortify Geba and Mizpah, on his side of the border.

== Later years ==
Hanani the Seer, a prophet, admonished Asa for relying on the King of Syria (or specifically in some interpretations; Damascus) as opposed to Divine help in defeating Baasha (2 Chronicles 16:7–10). Asa became very angry and threw Hanani in jail. Asa was also not as just as he had been and oppressed some of the people. In the thirty-ninth year of his reign, Asa developed a severe disease in his feet, for which he sought the help of physicians, not the Lord (2 Chronicles 16:12). In Thiele's chronology, Asa made his son Jehoshaphat coregent in the year that saw the onset of his disease. Asa died two years later and was buried with his ancestors in Jerusalem, in the grave that he had dug for himself, and a pyre was lit in his honor (2 Chronicles 16:13–14).

== Rabbinic literature ==
The question that puzzled Heinrich Ewald and others, "Where was the brazen serpent until the time of Hezekiah?" occupied the Talmudists also. They answered it as follows: Asa and Joshaphat, when clearing away the idols, purposely left the brazen serpent behind, in order that Hezekiah might also be able to do a praiseworthy deed in breaking it.

According to the Rabbis, Asa was one of the five men who were distinguished by certain physical perfections possessed by Adam, but due having abused them, were afflicted in those very body parts. Samson was distinguished by his strength, but "his strength went from him" (Judges 16:19); Saul by towering with his neck above the rest, but "he took a sword and fell upon it" (I Sam. 31:4); Absalom by his long hair, but "his head caught of the oak" (II Sam. 18:9); Zedekiah by his eyes, but "they put out the eyes of Zedekiah" (II Kings 25:7); Asa by his feet but "in the time of his old age he was diseased in his feet" (I Kings 15:23) (perhaps with gout). The reason given for Asa's condition was that, when enlisting the whole of Judah in war he "exempted none" (I Kings 15:22), but forced Torah scholars—and even newly married husbands, whom the Law (Deut. 20:7) exempts—to march along.

The chronological discrepancy between 2 Chronicles 16:1 and 1 Kings 16:8 is readjusted by the interpretation that the 36th year of Chronicles refers to the 36 years of the secession of the northern kingdom, which was a punishment for the 36 years of Solomon's marriage to the daughter of Pharaoh, and ended in reality in the 15th year of Asa's reign, when Zerah the Ethiopian was vanquished by him; the alliance between the kingdoms of Israel and Syria (I Kings xi. 23) also lasted 36 years. In obtaining an alliance with the king of Syria against Baasha by giving away the gold and silver treasures of the house of the Lord (I Kings 15:18), Asa sinned grievously, for which Hanani, the seer, sternly rebuked him (II Chronicles 16:7).

Asa, having contracted a matrimonial alliance with the wicked house of Omri, brought about the decree of Heaven that after 42 years both the houses of David and of Omri should go down together, which nearly happened in the time of Ahaziah, wherefore the latter is said to have been 42 years old when he ascended the throne (II Chron. xxii. 2) in contradiction with xxi. 20, and II Kings viii. 26.

Among the treasures which Asa took from Zerah the Ethiopian, and which Zerah had taken from Shishak (II Chronicles 12:9, compare 16:2), there was also the marvelous throne of Solomon upon which all the kings of Judah subsequently sat; while the other great treasures were given by Asa to the king of Syria to obtain his alliance; then they were taken again by the Ammonites, to be recaptured by Jehoshaphat; then they fell into the hands of Sennacherib, from whom Hezekiah recovered them, and at the capture of Jerusalem they came into the hands of the Babylonians; then into those of the Persians, and afterward of the Macedonians, and finally of the Romans, who kept them at Rome.

== In Christianity ==
In the Gospel of Matthew, Asa appears in the genealogy of Jesus.

== Chronological notes ==
William F. Albright has dated his reign to 913–873 BCE, while E. R. Thiele offers the dates 911/910–870/869 BCE. Thiele's chronology for the first kings of Judah contained an internal inconsistency that later scholars corrected by dating these kings one year earlier, so that Asa's dates are taken as 912/911 to 871/870 BC in the present article. 1 Kings and 2 Chronicles describe his reign in a favorable manner. They both give his reign as lasting 41 years.

According to Thiele, the calendars for reckoning the years of kings in Judah and Israel were offset by six months, that of Judah starting in Tishri (in the fall) and that of Israel in Nisan (in the spring). Cross-synchronizations between the two kingdoms therefore often allow narrowing of the beginning or ending dates of a king to within a six-month range. For Asa, the Bible allows the narrowing of his accession to some time between Tishri 1 of 912 BC and the day before Nisan 1 of the 911 BCE. For calculation purposes, this should be taken as the Judean year beginning in Tishri of 912/911 BCE. His death occurred at some time between Tishri 1 of 871 BCE and Nisan 1 of 870 BCE. These dates are one year earlier than those given in the third edition of Thiele's Mysterious Numbers of the Hebrew Kings, thereby correcting an internal inconsistency that Thiele never resolved.

== Notes ==
Asa of Judah House of David Cadet branch of the Tribe of Judah; Contemporary Kings of Israel: Jeroboam I, Nadab, Baasha, Elah, Zimri, Omri, Ahab
Regnal titles
Preceded by Abijam	King of Judah; 912–871 BCE	Succeeded by Jehoshaphat
