= Tel Jezreel =

Archaeological site in Israel

Jezreel
- יִזְרְעֶאל (Hebrew); Yizre'el
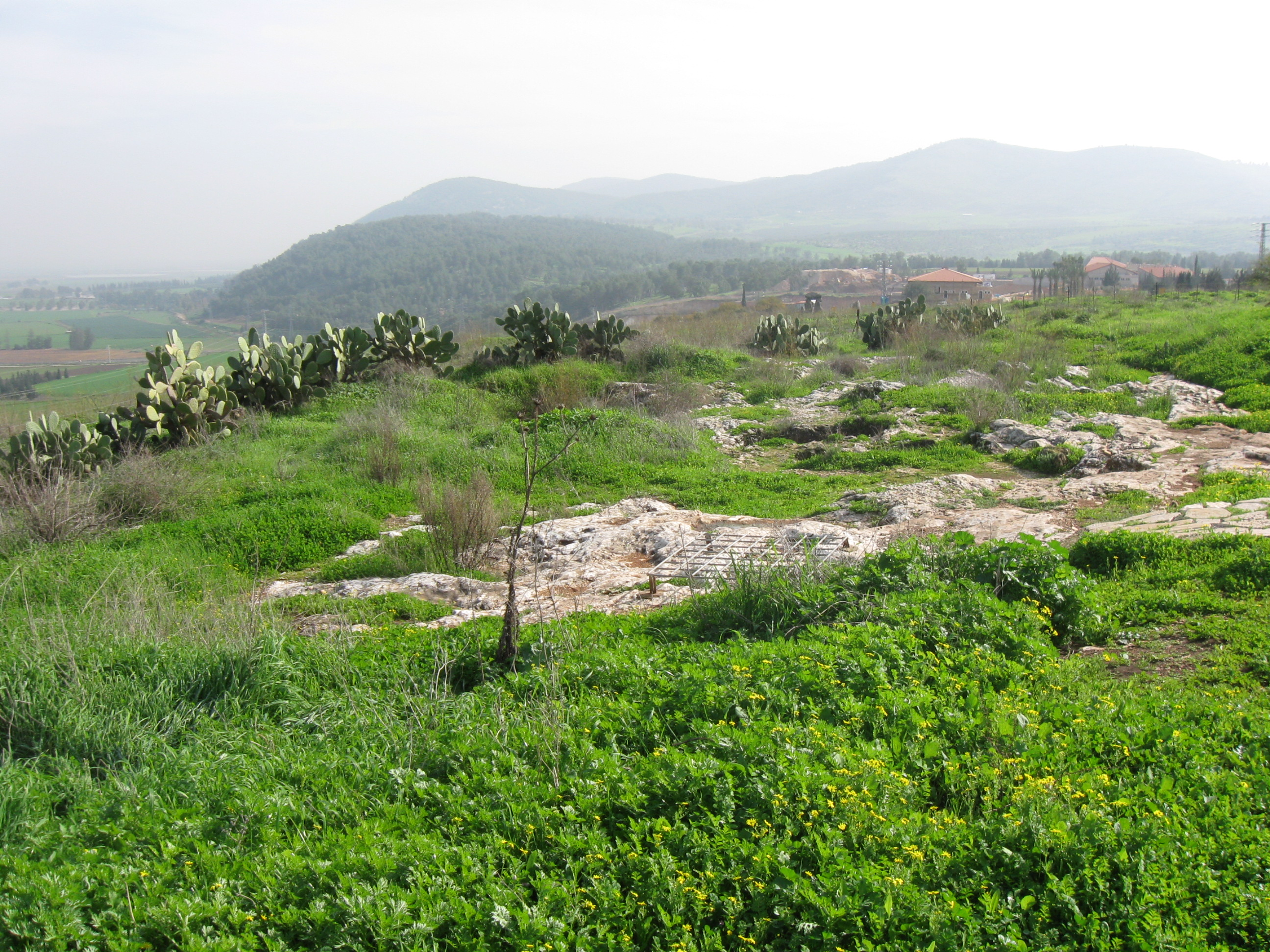
- Tel Jezreel looking east toward Gilboa.

- Location within Israel
- 32°33′28.27″N 35°19′40.63″E
- Type: palace
- Associated with: Ahab, Jezebel, Naboth, Ahinoam, Jehu, Elijah
- Location: Yizre'el, Israel
- Region: Jezreel Valley
- Part of: town

History
- Built by: Unknown

Site notes
- Material: stone
- Excavation dates: 1990-1996
- Archaeologists: David Ussishkin, John Woodhead

Tel Jezreel is an archaeological site in the eastern Jezreel Valley (Harod Valley) in northern Israel.

The ancient city of Jezreel (Hebrew: יִזְרְעֶאל, romanized: Yizrəʿel, lit. 'God will sow') served as a main fortress of the Northern Kingdom of Israel under king Ahab in the 9th century BCE.

== History ==
=== Chalcolithic Age ===
During the excavations, archaeologists collected pottery and other findings scattered all over the site. The earliest archaeological findings at the site date to the Wadi Raba culture of the 5th millennium BCE.

=== Bronze Ages ===
The "breathtaking views" that the site commands to the north and east are considered to have been of strategic importance during the Bronze and Iron Ages because the commercial and military highway from Egypt to Syria and Mesopotamia passed through Megiddo, the Jezreel Valley, and Beth Shean.

Based on the findings, the site was inhabited as an unfortified settlement throughout the entire Bronze Age period.

=== Iron Age ===
==== Iron IB ====
An unfortified settlement since the LBA. See Book of Samuel.

==== Iron IIA ====
In the 9th century BCE, Tel Jezreel was a main fortress thought to be built by king Omri. It was active in the reigns of King Ahab and his consort Queen Jezebel and their son King Jehoram. The pottery found in the fortress during the dig all dates to this brief period. Water was supplied by cisterns inside the walls and by the spring of 'En Jezreel northeast of the fortress. Because of the strategic location, ample water supply, and excellent grazing in the Jezreel Valley, archaeologists David Ussishkin and John Woodhead believe that Jezreel was the base for King Ahab's chariot corps and cavalry. It was destroyed soon afterward, possibly by the Arameans in the late 9th-century.

=== Byzantine period ===
The anonymous author of the Itinerarium Burdigalense, who visited the site in 333 CE, calls it by its Latinized name, Stradela, a word derived from the Greek form Esdráēla (Greek: Έσδράηλα). The fourth-century Christian nun and pilgrim Egeria visited Jezreel and reported that "the tomb of Jezebel is stoned by everyone to this very day."

=== Middle Ages to 1948 ===
Jezreel was the site of a Byzantine-era village, a Crusader-period village belonging to the Knights Templar, and a later Islamic period village named Zir'in (derived from the ancient name Jezreel). A "beautiful Crusader church still stands largely intact. Benjamin of Tudela visited Jezreel in 1165 CE and reports that a Jewish man "a dyer by profession" lived there. It was the site of a large Ottoman-era fortified tower. During the 1947–1949 Palestine war, the village of Ze'rin "became a central base for Arab forces" and was therefore conquered and the site cleared.

== Excavations ==
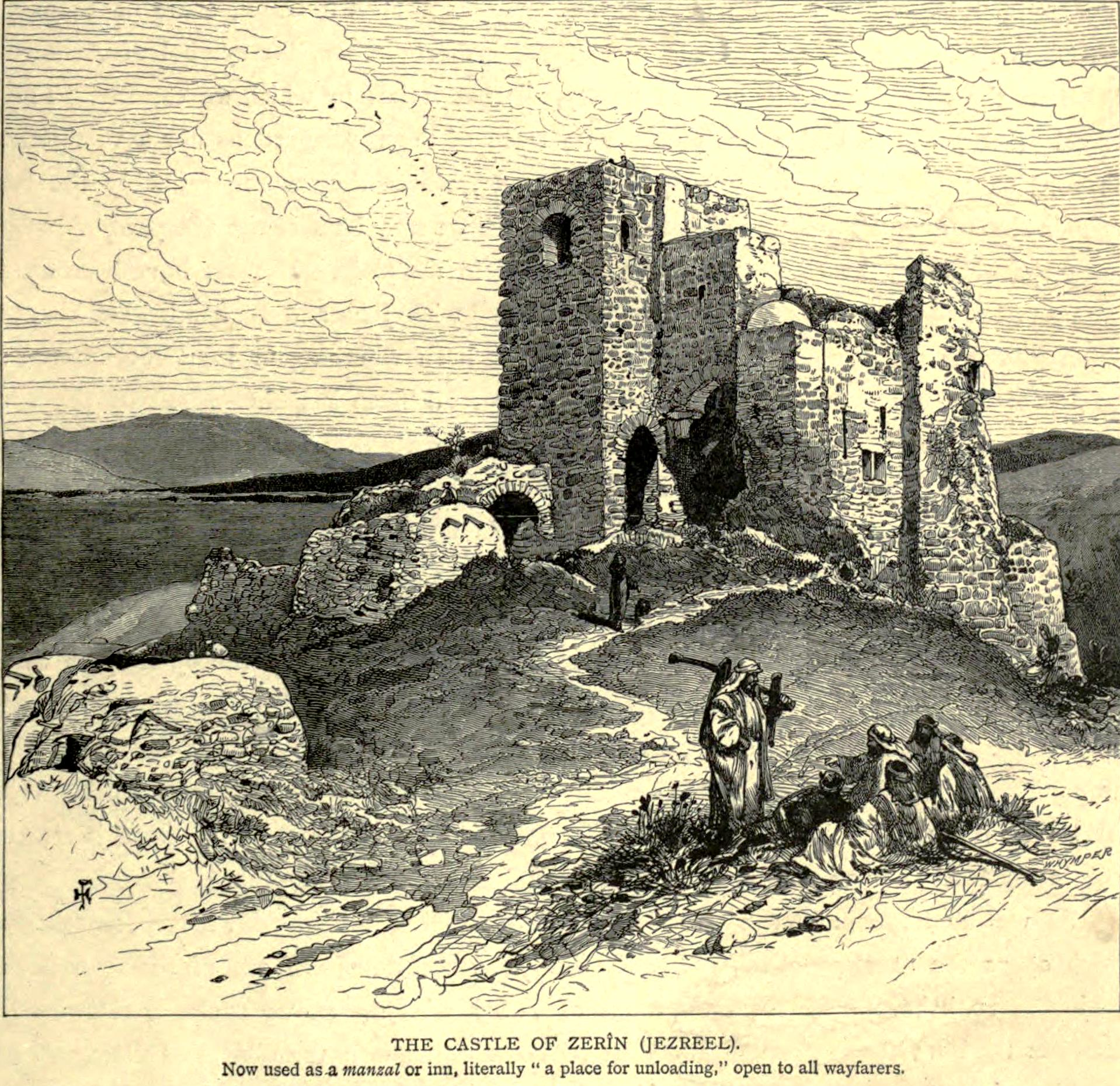
Ruined tower at Zir'in, 1880s.

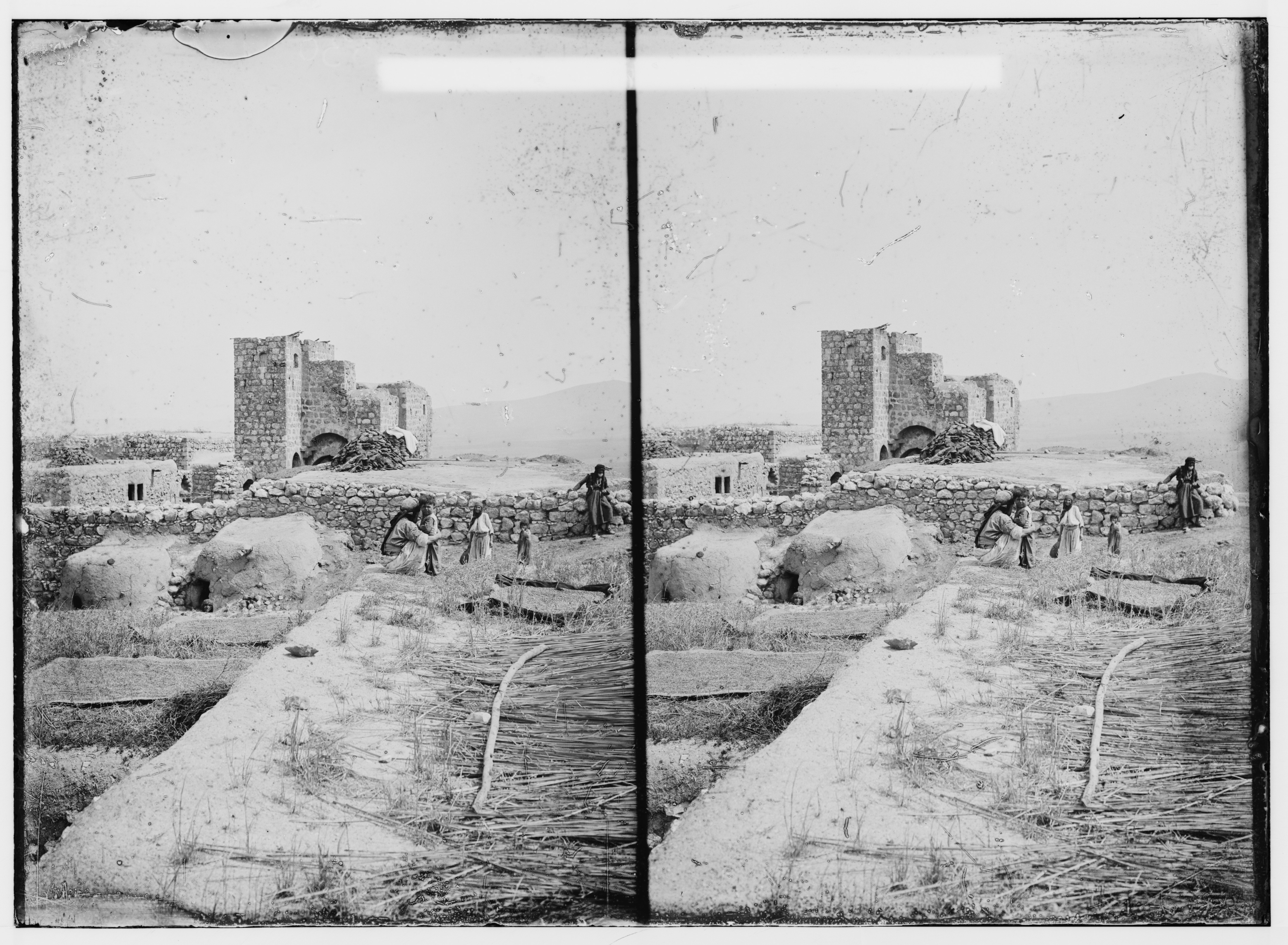
"Remains of the Tower of Jezebel", 1926 stereograph by a member of the American Colony in Jerusalem.

Archaeologists David Ussishkin and John Woodhead led a dig at Jezreel. In 1987, a bulldozer working near the site accidentally uncovered ancient structures, and a salvage dig was conducted, leading to the major dig under the direction of Ussishkin and Woodhead over seven seasons from 1990 to 1996. Staff and volunteers from about 25 countries (the largest groups were from United Kingdom, Sweden and Denmark) joined the dig.

Renewed excavations began in the summer of 2012 under the new directorship of Norma Franklin of the University of Haifa Zinman Institute of Archaeology, and Jennie Ebeling of the University of Evansville. The excavations uncovered a casemate wall and four projecting towers surrounding the fortress, built with a combination of well-cut ashlars, boulders and smaller stones, and an upper level of mud-brick. The fortress enclosed an area of almost 11 acres (45,000 m^{2}). It was 860' long and 470' wide, and defended by a steep slope to the north and a moat 20' deep and rampart on the other three sides.

Pursuant to evidence from this most recent excavation, Franklin further asserts that Jezreel likely contained both a vineyard and a winery near an installation made to house any visiting Israelite king, which is all consistent with several claims regarding the story of the vineyard's alleged owner—a man named Naboth—made in the Biblical Book of 1 Kings. While vineyards do not leave direct archaeological remains, an independently conducted soil analysis found a plot of land in Jezreel properly suited for growing grapes, while the soils in the fields further west from the location were found to be the right quality for growing olives. Furthermore, numerous indicators of an ancient winery were discovered at a "particularly impressive installation...carved into the limestone bedrock at the foot of the hill of Jezreel", such indicators including rock-cut treading floors; two adjacent rock-cut vats, each more than one meter in depth; another treading floor connected to a vat by a rock-cut channel; a deep circular basin that possibly functioned as additional vat; and a sump for collecting liquids.

== The Bible ==
=== Book of Samuel ===
Prior to the division of the United Kingdom of Israel, the city was the hometown of Ahinoam, second wife of King David, Michal, Saul's daughter, being the first, Ahinoam being his second, and Abigail, widow of Nabal, being his third (1 Samuel 25:43).

=== Book of Kings ===
==== Ahab ====
According to 1 Kings 18:45–46, following the prophet Elijah's victory over the prophets of Ba'al at Mount Carmel, Elijah instructs Ahab to return home to Jezreel, where he would be reporting on events to Jezebel, his wife, but "the hand of the Lord was upon Elijah" and he reached Jezreel ahead of Ahab (1 Kings 18:45–46). Jezreel is around 50 km from Mount Carmel.

According to the First Book of Kings, the royal palace of King Ahab, "one of the most famous of the royal residences of the kings of Israel", was in Jezreel, adjacent to the vineyard of Naboth (1 Kings 21:1). Ahab's capital remained in Samaria.

==== Jehu ====
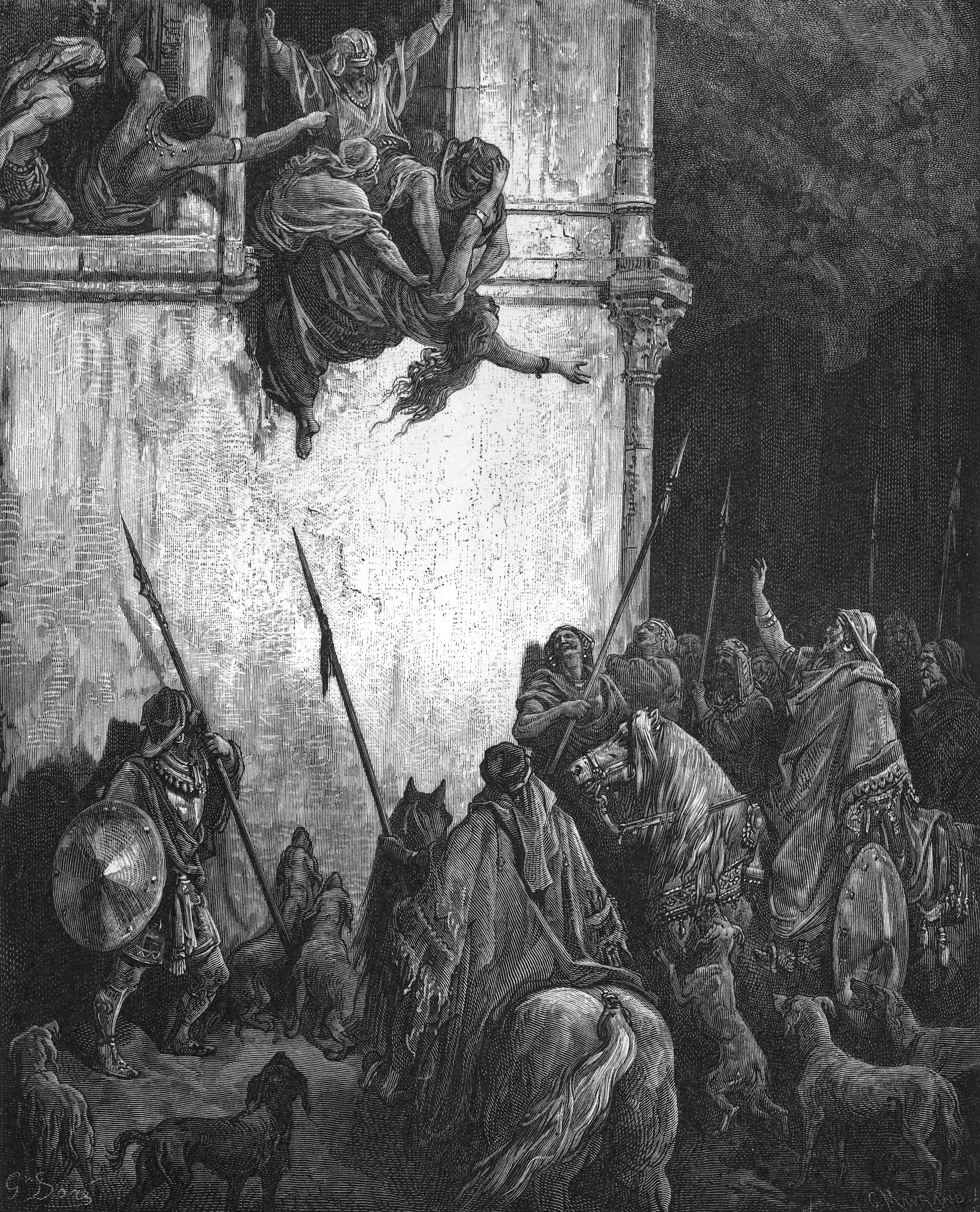
Queen Jezebel executed by defenestration in Jezreel, by Gustav Doré

As recounted in 2 Kings 9:1–37, after Jehu kills King Jehoram, son of Ahab, he confronts Jezebel in Jezreel and urges her eunuchs to kill her by throwing her out of a window. They comply, throwing her out the window. They left her in the street where she was eaten by dogs. Only Jezebel's skull, feet, and hands remained. In 2 Kings 10:8 Jehu orders the death of 70 descendants of Ahab, and has their heads sent to the new king in Jezreel and piled up in "two heaps at the gate entrance."

=== Book of Hosea ===
The book of Hosea mentions Jezreel. God commands Hosea to name his son "Jezreel, because I will soon punish the house of Jehu for the massacre at Jezreel, and I will put an end to the kingdom of Israel" (Hosea 1:4). God also tells Hosea as to a future event, "I will espouse you with faithfulness; then you shall be devoted to the LORD. In that day, I will respond—declares the LORD—I will respond to the sky, and it shall respond to the earth; And the earth shall respond with new grain and wine and oil, and they shall respond to Jezreel." (Hosea 2:20–22). Hosea also mentions, "In that day I will break Israel's bow in the Valley of Jezreel." (Hosea 1:5).
