= Nadab of Israel =

King of Israel in the 10th century BCE

Nadab נָדָב
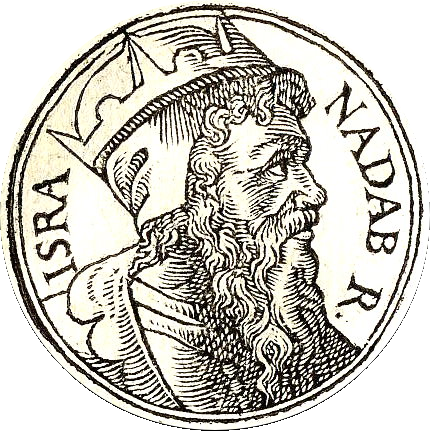
- Nadab from Guillaume Rouillé's Promptuarii Iconum Insigniorum

King of Israel (Northern Kingdom)
- Reign: 910–909 BCE
- Predecessor: Jeroboam
- Successor: Baasha
- Died: 909 BC
- Father: Jeroboam

Nadab (Hebrew: נָדָב Nāḏāḇ) was the second king of the northern Israelite Kingdom of Israel. He was the son and successor of Jeroboam.

== Reign ==
Nadab became king of Israel in the second year of Asa, King of Judah, and reigned for two years. William F. Albright has dated his reign to 901–900 BCE, while E. R. Thiele offers the dates 910–909 BCE.

In the second year of his reign, while they were besieging Gibbethon, a Philistine town in southern Dan, a conspiracy broke out in Nadab's army. He was slain by one of his own captains, Baasha, who then made himself king of Israel.

Having slain Nadab, Baasha put to death the remainder of the royal family (1 Kings 14:20, 15:25–29). This was consistent with the prophecy given via Ahijah the Shilonite concerning the extinction of the entire House of Jeroboam.

Nadab, son of King Jeroboam I and Egyptian Princess Ano, was next in line for the throne. Following the untimely death of his brother Abijah, Nadab became the crown prince. As a member of the tribe of Ephraim, Nadab's reign was marked by turmoil, ultimately leading to his downfall.

Baasha, one of Nadab's own commanders, orchestrated a coup, overthrowing and killing Nadab. This pivotal event marked the end of Nadab's ill-fated monarchy in Israel.

Nadab of Israel Tribe of Ephraim; Contemporary Kings of Judah: Asa
Regnal titles
Preceded by Jeroboam I	King of Israel; 910–909 BCE	Succeeded by Baasha
