= Baasha of Israel =

Third king of Israel

Baasha בַּעְשָׁא
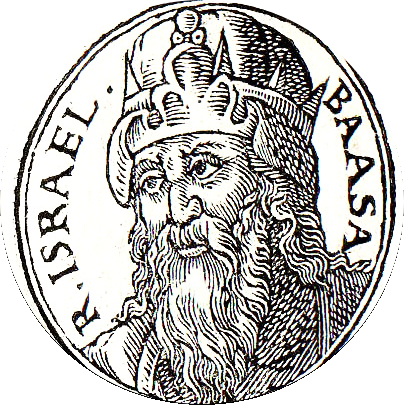
- Baasha from "Guillaume Rouillé's Promptuarii Iconum Insigniorum

King of Israel (Northern Kingdom)
- Reign: 909–886 BCE
- Predecessor: Nadab
- Successor: Elah

Baasha (Hebrew: בַּעְשָׁא, Baʿšāʾ) was the third king of the northern Israelite Kingdom of Israel. He was the son of Ahijah of the Tribe of Issachar. Baasha's story is told in 1 Kings 15:16–16:7.

== Reign ==
Baasha became king of Israel in the third year of Asa, king of Judah. (1 Kings 15:28) William F. Albright has dated his reign to 900–877 BCE, while E. R. Thiele offers the dates 909–886 BCE. Baasha came to power by murdering the previous king, Nadab, at Gibbethon, followed by the entire House of Jeroboam (Nadab's father and predecessor). Baasha had previously been a captain in Nadab's own army. Like many military leaders, he appears to have risen from obscurity. The Jewish Encyclopedia suggests that because he came from the tribe of Issachar, "he may have represented a local faction".

Over the course of his 24-year reign, Baasha was at war with Asa, king of Judah. He allied Israel with Aram and endeavored to strangle Judah's trade by fortifying Ramah, a city five miles north of Jerusalem. King Asa of Judah then bribed King Ben-hadad of Syria to switch sides and attack Israel, prompting the loss of extensive territory in Dan and Naphtali northwest of the Sea of Galilee. Baasha was forced to withdraw from Ramah. Asa of Judah utilized the materials of the abandoned fort for the fortification of his own frontier towns, Geba and Mizpah.

Though Baasha remained in power for life, he was not without his opponents. The prophet Jehu, the son of Hanani, foretold the destruction of his dynasty, which came to pass with the assassination of Baasha's son Elah.

Baasha of Israel Tribe of Issachar; Contemporary Kings of Judah: Asa
Regnal titles
Preceded by Nadab	King of Israel; 909–886 BCE	Succeeded by Elah
