= Omri =

Biblical King of Israel

Omri עָמְרִי
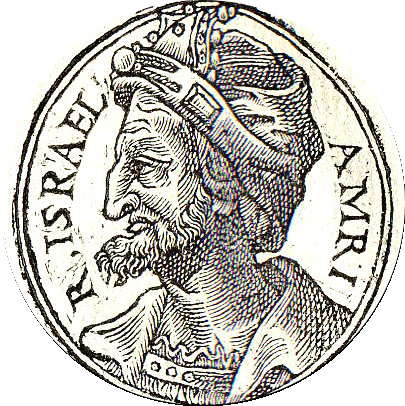
- Portrait from Promptuarium Iconum Insigniorum (1553) by Guillaume Rouillé

King of Israel (Northern Kingdom)
- Reign: 885–874 BC
- Predecessor: Tibni
- Successor: Ahab
- Issue: Ahab; Athaliah; Nimshi?
- House: House of Omri

Omri (Hebrew: עָמְרִי, ‘Omrī; Akkadian: 𒄷𒌝𒊑𒄿 Ḫûmrî [ḫu-um-ri-i]; fl. 9th century BCE) was the sixth king of Israel. He was a successful military campaigner who extended the northern kingdom of Israel. Other monarchs from the House of Omri are Ahab, Ahaziah, Joram, and Athaliah. Like his predecessor, king Zimri, who ruled for only seven days, Omri is the second king mentioned in the Bible without a statement of his tribal origin. One possibility, though unproven, is that he was of the tribe of Issachar.

Nothing is said in the Hebrew Bible about the lineage of Omri. His name may be Amorite, Arabic, or Hebrew in origin. Omri is credited with the construction of Samaria and establishing it as his capital. Although the Bible is silent about other actions taken during his reign, he is described as doing more evil than all the kings who preceded him. An alternative modern hypothesis maintains that, as founder of the House of Omri, an Israelite royal house, his kingdom formed the first state in the Land of Israel, and that the Kingdom of Judah only achieved statehood later.

Extrabiblical sources such as the Mesha Stele and the Black Obelisk of Shalmaneser III also mention his name; however, in the case of the Black Obelisk the reference is to the dynasty named for Omri rather than to Omri himself. Many scholars consider Omri the first truly historical figure in the Bible, though this is debated.

== Name ==
The name "Omri" itself is puzzling to scholars. Its etymology is uncertain, and theories have proposed an origin in several Semitic languages. In the Hebrew Bible, the name "Omri" appears three times outside of references to the king, first to denote a son of Becher, the second of Benjamin's ten sons, second to denote a descendant of Perez, son of Judah, and finally to denote a prince of the tribe of Issachar, seemingly suggesting an Israelite origin for the name. Likewise, that Jezreel was the site of Omri's estate has been taken by some scholars as indicating that Omri had called the area home, which may imply he was a scion of the tribe of Issachar, but this remains unproven. If Omri, and by extension his name, were indeed of Israelite provenance, a number of Hebrew etymologies have been proposed for ‘Omrī: including a hypocorism of the unattested personal name ‘Omrīyyā (עָמְרִיָּה "servant of Yah"), and derivation from the verb ‘āmar (עָמַר) meaning "to bind, gather".

== Reign ==
=== Struggle for the succession ===
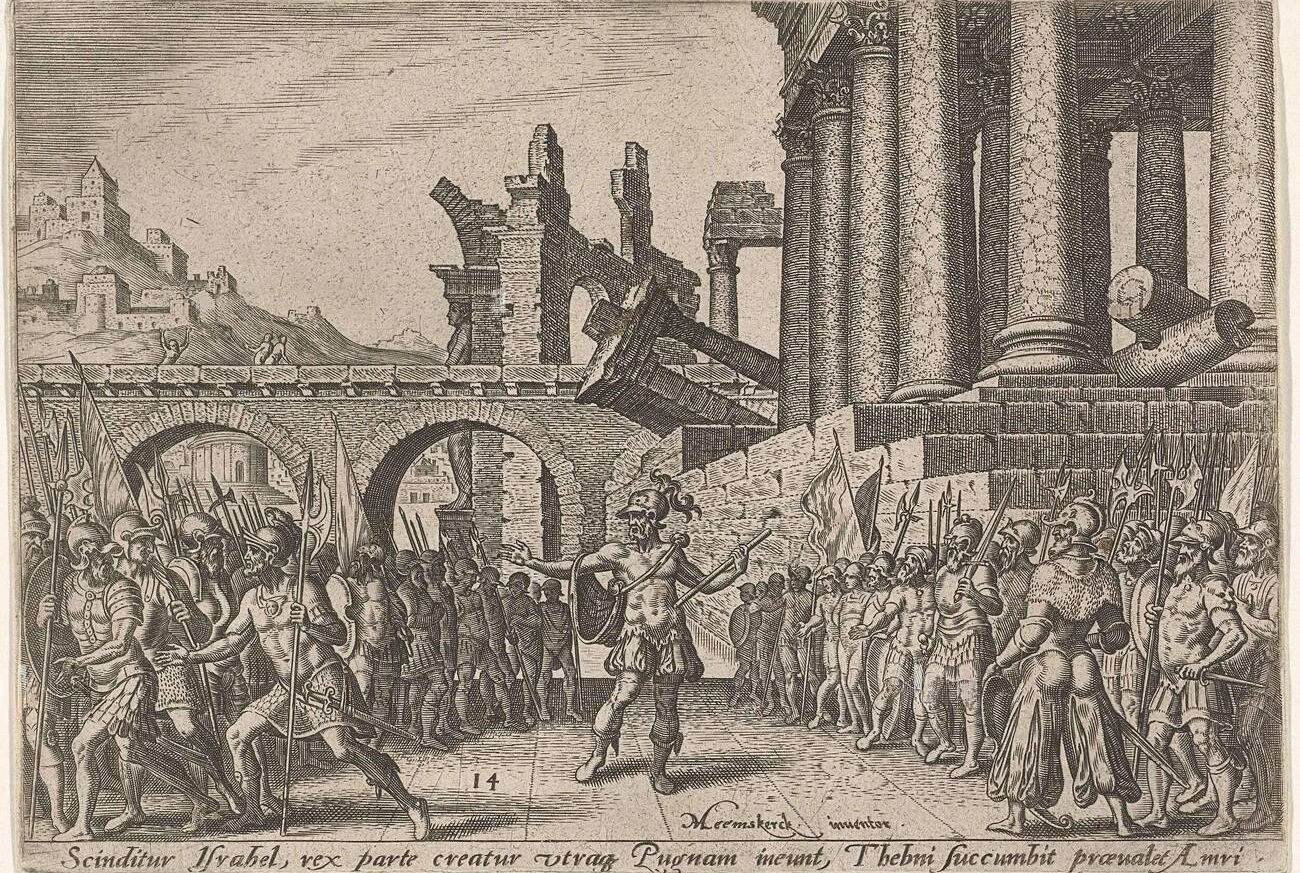
"Israel is divided betwixt Omri and Tibni" (Philip Galle and Maarten van Heemskerck, 1569)

According to the biblical narrative, Omri was "commander of the army" of King Elah when Zimri, "commander of half the king's chariots", murdered Elah and made himself king. Instead, the troops at Gibbethon chose Omri as king, and he led them to Tirzah where they besieged it. When Zimri saw that the city was taken, he committed suicide by shutting himself in the royal palace and setting it ablaze. He died after a reign of only seven days. Although Zimri was eliminated, "half of the people" supported Tibni in opposition to Omri. It took Omri four years to subdue Tibni and at last proclaim himself undisputed king of Israel.

=== Samaria and successor ===
Initially, the capital was in Tirzah, which had been besieged and the royal palace had been burned down. The Jewish Encyclopedia suggests that "the associations of Tirzah were so repellent and sanguinary, and the location so poor for a capital, that Omri purchased a new site" for his residence. This was the city of Samaria, on a hill purchased from Shemer for two talents of silver, where Omri built a new capital for the kingdom. In Samaria, Omri reigned until his death and was buried there. His son Ahab became the next king.

== Date ==
Omri became king of Israel in the 31st year of Asa, king of Judah and reigned for 12 years, 6 years of which were in Tirzah. The biblical reference to the period of rivalry with Tibni is from the 27th year of Asa to the 31st year. There are several possible dates: William F. Albright has dated his reign to 876–869 BCE, Edwin R. Thiele offers the dates of 888 BCE to 880 BCE for his rivalry with Tibni and 880–874 BCE for his sole reign, while Paul L. Maier affirms that it happened between 881–873 BCE.

== Archaeological sources ==
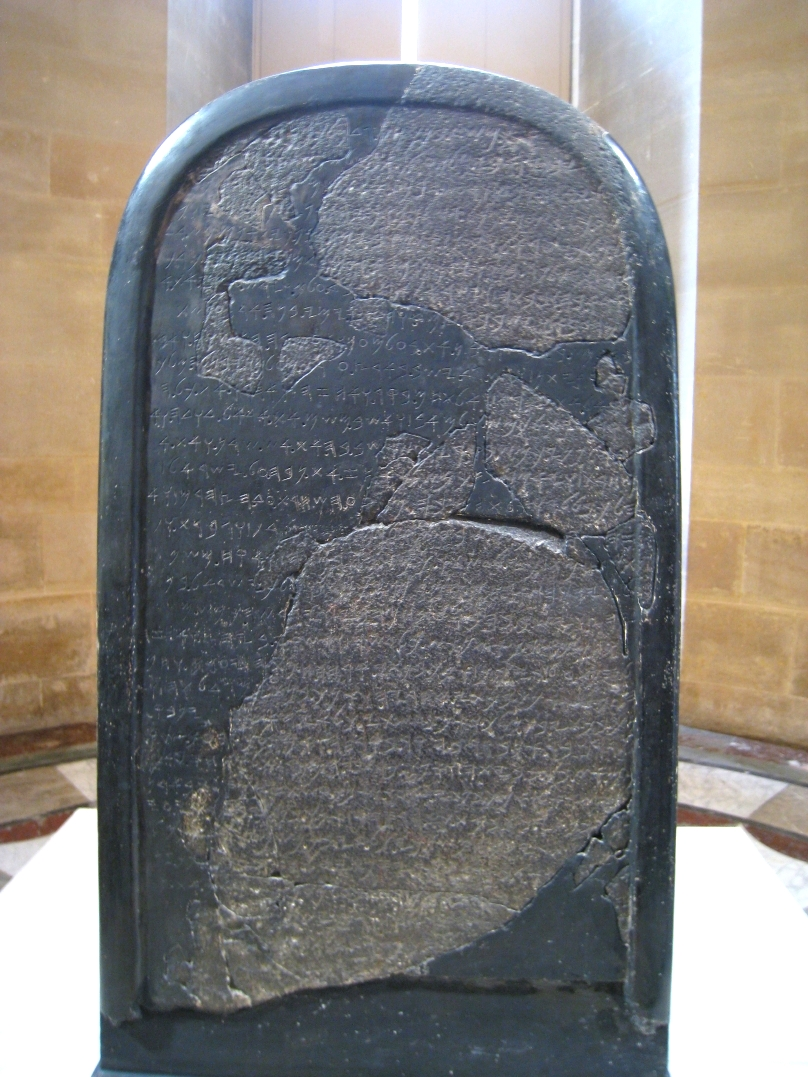
The Mesha Stele

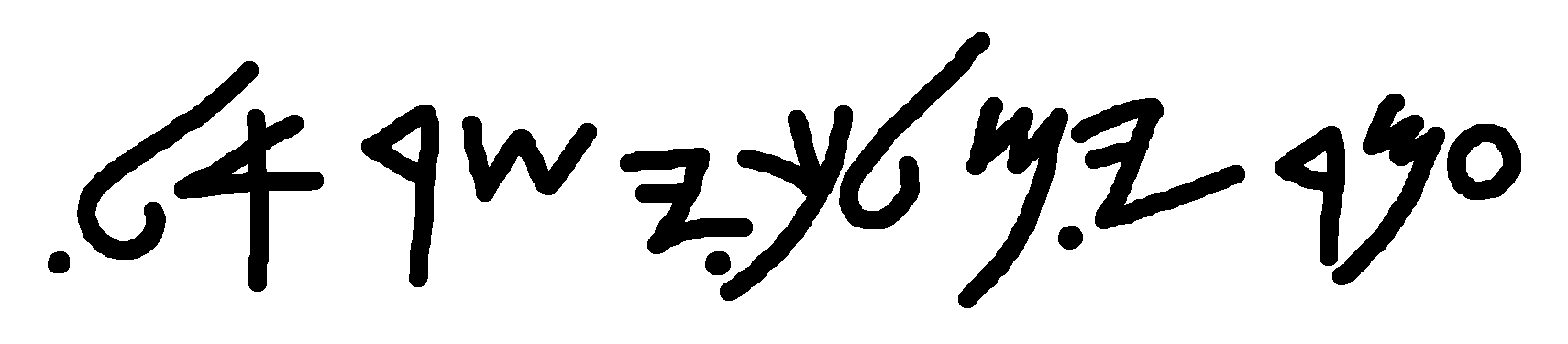
עמרי מלך ישראל (‘mry mlk yšr’l) – "Omri king of Israel" as mentioned in the Moabite inscription

The fortress at Jezreel was situated on one of the main east–west routes through the kingdom. Hugh Williamson believes it served not only a military function, but also a political one; a very visible example of grandiose public works used as a means of social control and to assert claims of legitimacy.

The Moabite Mesha stele (on display in the Louvre) indicates that Omri expanded his holdings to include northern Moab east of the Jordan River. It makes reference to the oppression of Moab by "Omri King of Israel". Israel would later become identified in sources as the "House of Omri" (Bit-Humria), with the term "Israel" being used less and less as history progressed (the other defining term for "Israel" is "Samaria", beginning in the reign of Joash)..

The Assyrian Black Obelisk in the British Museum has been interpreted as referring to Jehu "son of Omri", though that interpretation has been questioned, in favor of the reading "Omride".

== The Omride Dynasty ==
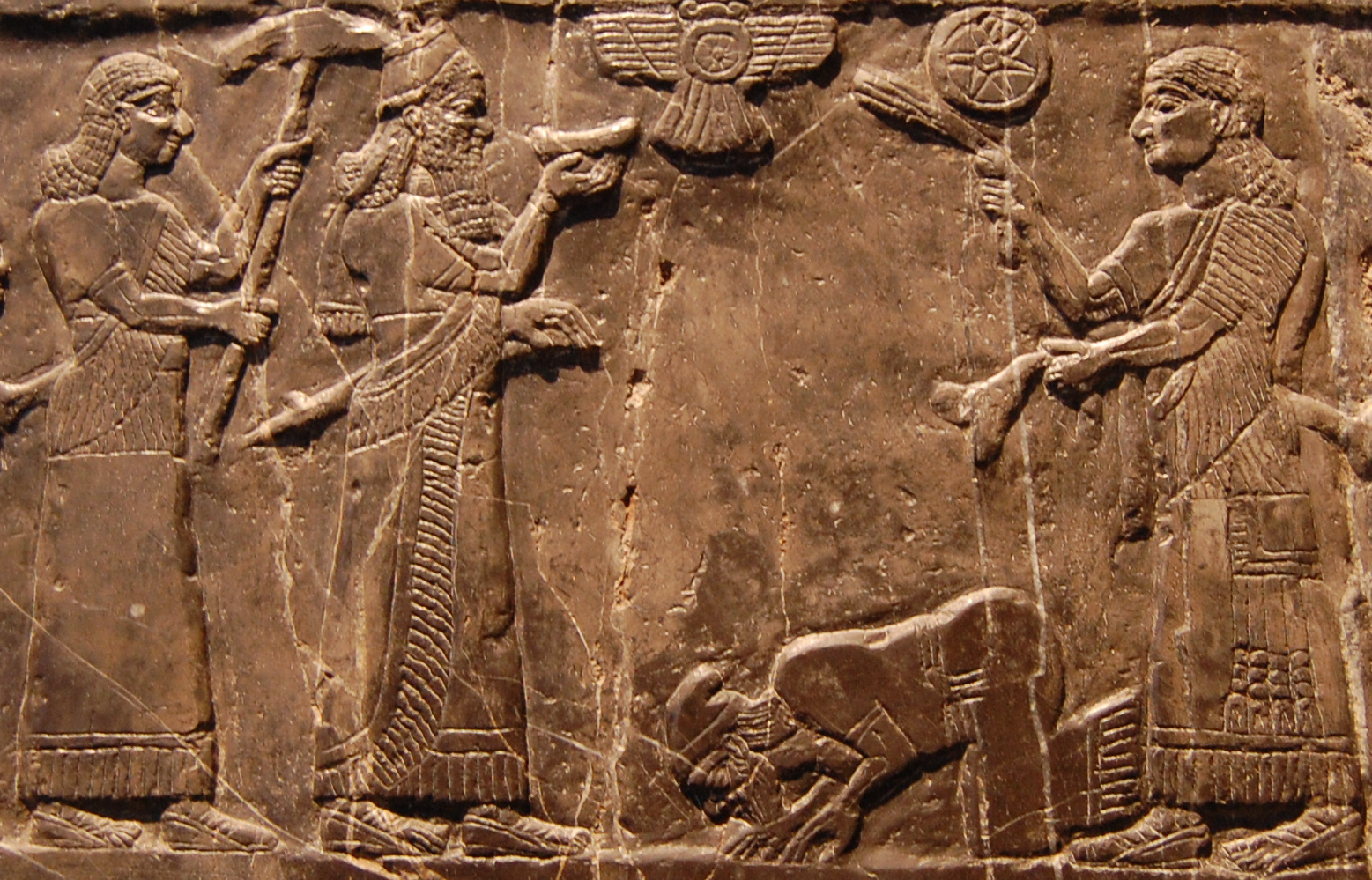
In a scene from the Black Obelisk Jehu, designated ^{m}Ia-ú-a mar ^{m}Hu-um-ri-i (Jehu of the land of people of Omri) bows before Shalmaneser III.

The short-lived dynasty founded by Omri constituted a new chapter in the history of the Northern Kingdom of Israel. It ended almost fifty years of constant civil war over the throne. There was peace with the Kingdom of Judah to the south, and even cooperation between the two rival states, while relations with neighboring Sidon to the north were bolstered by marriages negotiated between the two royal courts. This state of peace with two powerful neighbors enabled the Kingdom of Israel to expand its influence and even political control in Transjordan, and these factors combined brought economic prosperity to the kingdom.

On the other hand, peace with Sidon also resulted in the penetration of Phoenician religious ideas into the kingdom and led to a kulturkampf between traditionalists (as personified by the prophet Elijah and his followers) and the aristocracy (as personified by Omri's son and heir Ahab and his consort Jezebel). In foreign affairs, this period paralleled the rise of the Kingdom of Aram based in Damascus, and Israel soon found itself at war in the northeast. Most threatening, however, was the ascendancy of Assyria, which was beginning to expand westward from Mesopotamia: the Battle of Qarqar (853 BCE), which pitted Shalmaneser III of Assyria against a coalition of local kings, including Ahab, was the first clash between Assyria and Israel. It was the first in a series of wars that would eventually lead to the destruction of the Kingdom of Israel in 722 BCE and the reduction of the Kingdom of Judah to an Assyrian tributary state.

In 841 BCE, the Assyrian king Shalmaneser III campaigned along the Mediterranean coast and forced Jehu to pay tribute. Assyrian kings frequently referred to Omri's successors as belonging to the "House of Omri" (Bit Hu-um-ri-a).

== See also ==
- History of ancient Israel and Judah
- List of biblical figures identified in extra-biblical sources

Omri House of Omri; Contemporary King of Judah: Asa
Regnal titles
Preceded by Zimri	King of Israel; Rival to Tibni: 885–880 BCE; Sole reign: 880–874 BCE	Succeeded by Ahab
