= Israelites =

Hebrew ethno-religious group in Canaan during the Iron Age

Map of the territorial allotment of the Twelve Tribes of Israel before Dan moved next to Naphtali due to conflict with the Philistines, based on the Book of Joshua

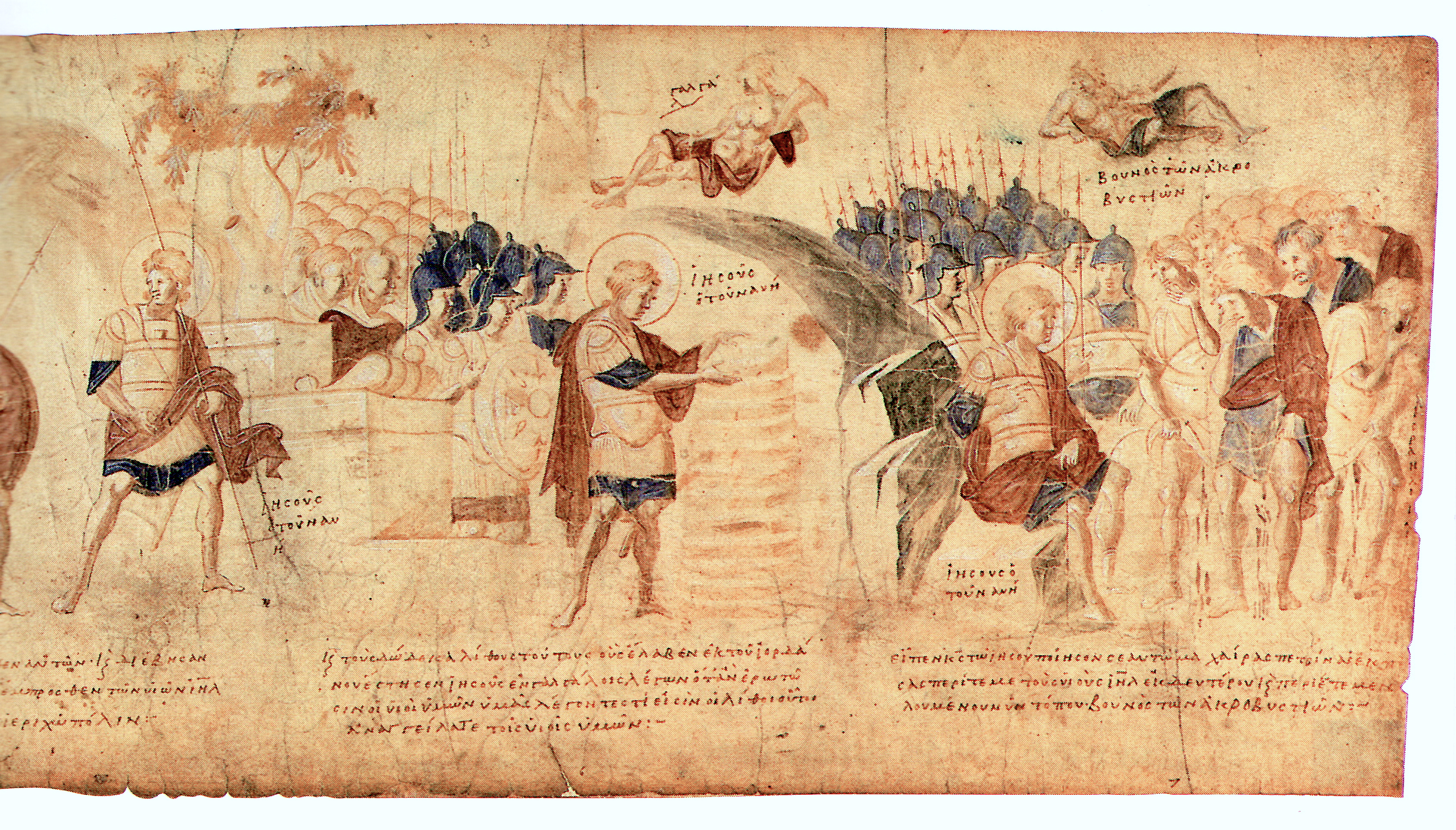
Sheet 3 of the Joshua Roll; Joshua and the Israelites

The Israelites, also known as the Children of Israel, (Note: /ˈɪzrəlaɪts, -riə-/; Hebrew: בְּנֵי יִשְׂרָאֵל, romanized: Bənēy Yīsrāʾēl, transl. 'Children of Israel') were an ancient Semitic-speaking people who lived in Canaan during the Iron Age. They are associated with the Hebrews and spoke Biblical Hebrew, an archaic form of the Hebrew language. According to the Bible, the Israelites were composed of twelve related tribes who united by forming the eponymous United Kingdom of Israel. Historically, Israelites founded the two Iron Age kingdoms of Israel and Judah.

Modern scholarship describes Israelite highland settlement as emerging from indigenous Canaanite populations and other peoples of the ancient Near East. The Israelite religion revolved around Yahweh, who was an ancient Semitic god with initially limited significance in the broader Canaanite religion. Around 720 BCE, the Kingdom of Israel was conquered by the Neo-Assyrian Empire, triggering the Assyrian captivity; and around 586 BCE, the Kingdom of Judah was conquered by the Neo-Babylonian Empire, triggering the Babylonian captivity. While most of Israel's population was irreversibly dispossessed as a result of Assyrian resettlement policy, the exiled Judahites were allowed to return and rehabilitate their country by the Achaemenid king Cyrus the Great following the fall of Babylon in 539 BCE.

In the narrative of the Hebrew Bible, the Israelites were the descendants of Jacob (later known as Israel), who was a son of Isaac and thereby a grandson of Abraham. Due to a severe drought in Canaan, Jacob and his twelve sons migrated to Egypt, where each son became the eponymous progenitor of an Israelite tribe. In Egypt, the Israelites grew from a family into a nation and were enslaved before being liberated by Moses, whose successor Joshua oversaw the Israelite conquest of Canaan. After taking control of Canaan, they established a kritarchy, (Note: rule of what the Bible calls shopheṭim, Hebrew: שׁוֹפֵט, romanized: šōp̄ēṭ, lit. 'Judges') and eventually founded the United Monarchy, which eventually split into Israel in the north and Judah in the south. Scholars generally consider the Hebrew Bible's narrative to be part of the Israelites' national myth, but believe that there is a "historical core" to some of the events in it. The historicity of the United Monarchy is widely disputed. In the context of Hebrew scripture, Canaan is also variously described as the Promised Land, the Land of Israel, Zion, or the Holy Land.

The modern descendants of Israelites include Jews and Samaritans. Jews trace their ancestry to the tribes that inhabited the Kingdom of Judah, namely Judah, Benjamin, and partially Levi, while Samaritans trace their ancestry to the tribes that inhabited the Kingdom of Israel and remained after the Assyrian captivity, namely Ephraim, Manasseh, and partially Levi. Furthermore, Judaism and Samaritanism are fundamentally rooted in Israelite religious and cultural traditions. There are several other groups claiming affiliation with the Israelites, but most of them have unproven lineage and are not recognized as either Jewish or Samaritan.

== Etymology ==
The first reference to Israel in non-biblical sources is found in the Merneptah Stele in c. 1209 BCE. The inscription is very brief and says: "Israel is laid waste and his seed is not". The inscription refers to a people, not an individual or nation state, who inhabit central Palestine or the highlands of Samaria. Some Egyptologists suggest that Israel appeared in earlier topographical reliefs, dating to the Eighteenth Dynasty or Nineteenth Dynasty (i.e. reign of Ramesses II) , but this reading remains controversial.

In the Hebrew Bible, Israel first appears in Genesis 32:29, where an angel renames Jacob to Israel after Jacob fought with him. According to the folk etymology given in the text, Israel is derived from yisra, "to prevail over" or "to struggle with", and El, a Canaanite-Mesopotamian creator god that is tenuously identified with Yahweh. However, modern scholarship interprets El as the subject, "El rules/struggles", from sarar (שָׂרַר) 'to rule' (cognate with sar (שַׂר) 'ruler', Akkadian šarru 'ruler, king'), which is likely cognate with the similar root sara (שׂרה) "fought, strove, contended". Dr. Tzemah Yoreh clarifies that Israel is a combination of 'to strive with' (ש.ר.ה) and 'God' (אל) and that Jacob's name alternates between Jacob and Israel in the biblical narrative, even after his renaming, due to the authors having different opinions about Jacob's moral character. The gradual ethnonymic shift from "Israelites" to "Jews", regardless of their descent from Judah is made explicit in the Book of Esther (4th century BCE) of the Tanakh.

== Biblical timeline ==
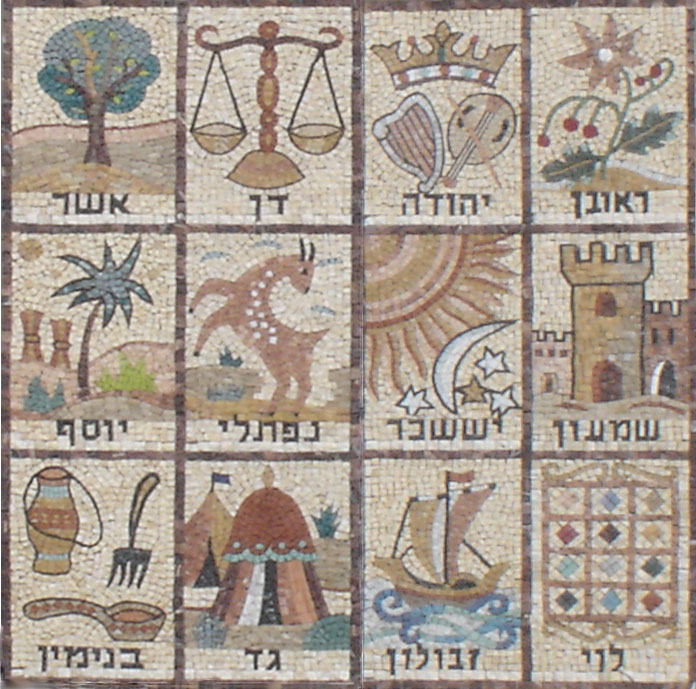
Mid-20th century mosaic of the 12 Tribes of Israel, from the Etz Yosef synagogue wall in Givat Mordechai, Jerusalem

=== Genesis of the Israelite people ===
Biblically, the Israelites referred to the descendants of Israel, a view that was reinforced by Second Temple Judaism, although gentiles could fully assimilate into the Israelite community. Israelites referred to themselves as the "sons of Israel" (Hebrew: בְּנֵי יִשְׂרָאֵל, romanized: Bənēy Yīsrāʾēl, transl. 'Children of Israel'); although the term sometimes referred to literal descent from Jacob, it most often referred to membership in the tribe or citizenship, especially after Israel's biological family transitioned from a clan to a nation (Exodus 1:9). The Israelite identity is alternatively interpreted as being based on religious allegiance, especially through worship of Yahweh or 'covenantal circumcision'. There's also contentious evidence of Israelite tribal status being acquired through self-declared allegiance, residency within assigned tribal territory (Ezekiel 47:21–23) or forceful absorption by a greater Israelite tribe. Jason A. Staples argues that the Israelites referred to the northern Israelite tribes, especially in the Nevi'im, although it's also inclusive of the other tribes in other contexts.

The Israelites trace their ancestors to Jacob, who in turn descended from Abraham. Abraham was formerly a native of Ur Kaśdim (Genesis 11:31), whose location is unknown. Some scholars argue that it is located in lower Mesopotamia whilst others locate it further north in upper Mesopotamia, around northern Syria or southeastern Turkey.

Theologians suggest that Canaan always belonged to the Israelites but was initially usurped by the descendants of Canaan, resulting in their conquest by Israel as divine punishment. Israelite presence in Canaan was also established before Joshua's conquests according to a few biblical traditions.

The history of the Israelite people can be divided into these categories, according to the Hebrew Bible:

=== Before the United Monarchy ===
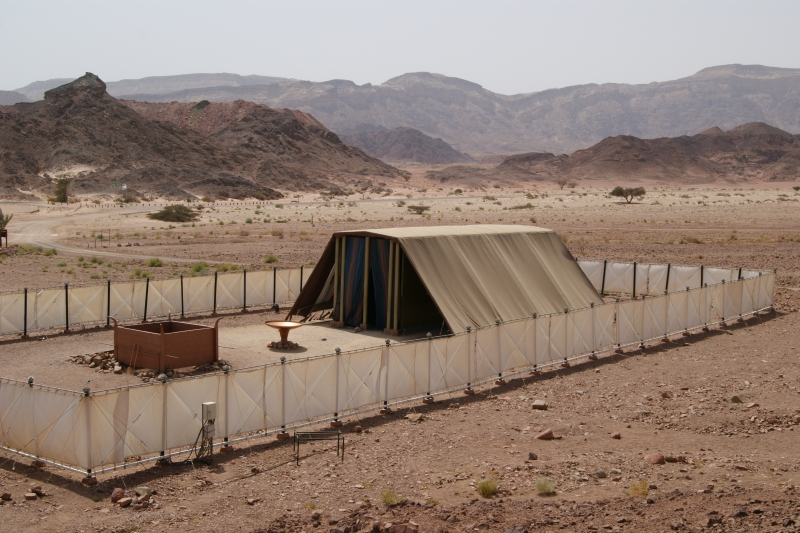
Model of the Tabernacle constructed under the auspices of Moses, in Timna Park, Israel

The Israelites were named after their ancestor, Jacob/Israel, who was the grandson of Abraham. They were organized into 12 tribes: Reuben, Simeon, Levi, Judah, Dan, Naphtali, Gad, Asher, Issachar, Zebulun, Joseph (or Tribe of Ephraim and Tribe of Manasseh) and Benjamin. After a famine in Canaan, Jacob and his twelve sons migrated to Egypt, where each son became the eponymous progenitor of an Israelite tribe. In Egypt, the Israelites grew from a family into a nation and were enslaved by the Egyptians. They escaped under the leadership of Moses and organized themselves as a kritarchy, where they followed laws given by Moses. Afterwards, the Israelites conquered Canaan and fought with several neighbours until they established a monarchic state. This period is covered by Genesis 12 to 1 Samuel 8.

=== During the United Monarchy ===
As a monarchic state, the Israelite tribes were united by the leadership of Saul, David and Solomon. The reigns of Saul and David were marked by military victories and Israel's transition to a mini-empire with vassal states. Solomon's reign was relatively more peaceful and oversaw the construction of the First Temple, with the help of Phoenician allies. This Temple was where the Ark of the Covenant was stored; its former location was the City of David. This period is covered by 1 Samuel 8 to 1 Kings 11 or alternatively, 1 Chronicles 10 to 2 Chronicles 9.

=== Division of Israel and Judah ===
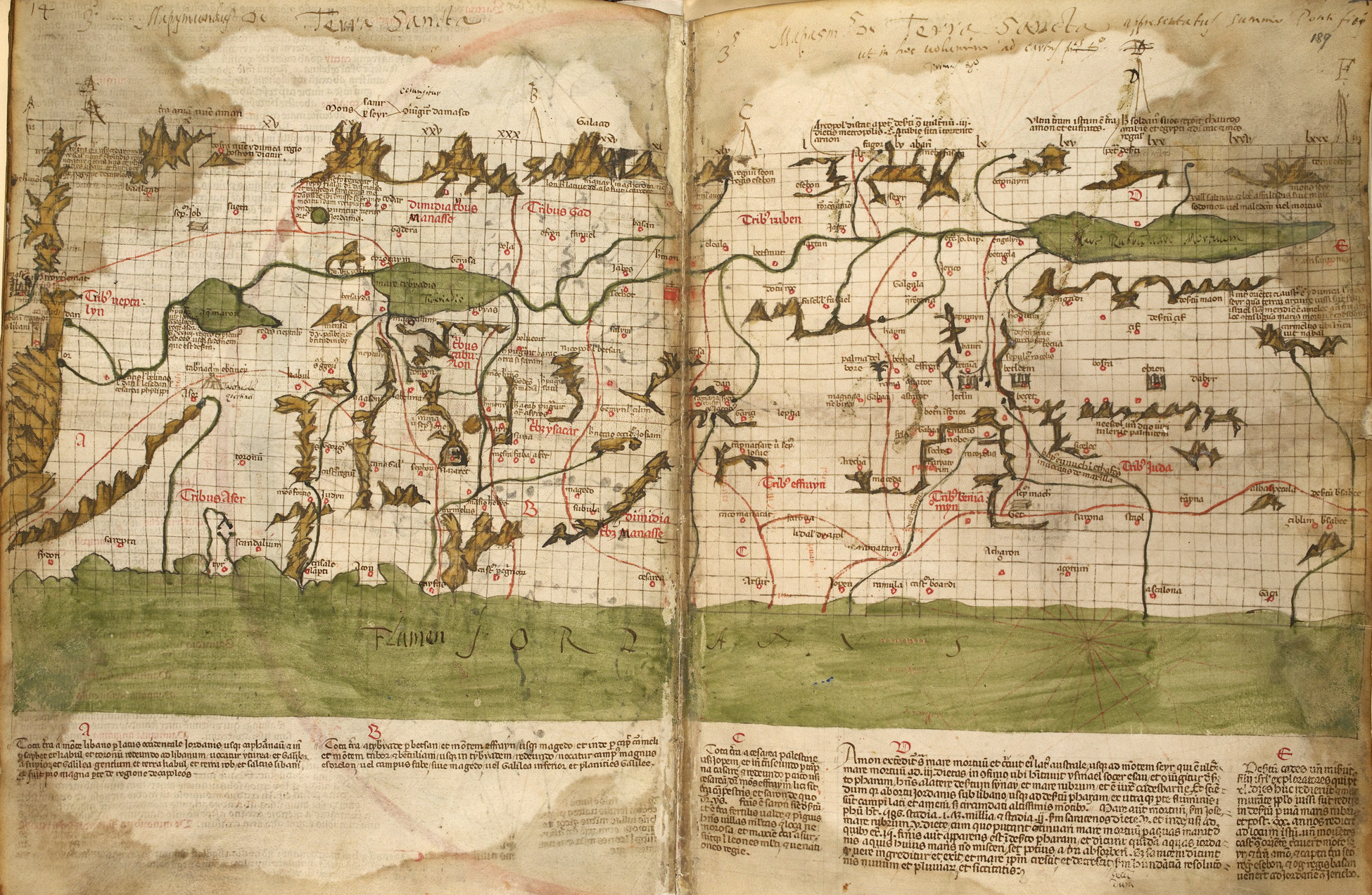
Map of the Holy Land, Pietro Vesconte, 1321, showing the allotments of the tribes of Israel. Described by Adolf Erik Nordenskiöld as "the first non-Ptolemaic map of a definite country"

The monarchic state was divided into two states, Israel and Judah, due to civil and religious disputes. Eventually, Israel and Judah met their demise after the Assyrian and Babylonian invasions respectively. According to the Biblical prophets, these invasions were divine judgements for religious apostasy and corrupt leadership. This period is covered by 1 Kings 12 to 2 Kings 25 or alternatively, 2 Chronicles 10 to 2 Chronicles 36. The Book of Jonah narrates the prophet Jonah going to the Neo-Assyrian Empire to deliver a divine message.

=== Exilic period ===
After the Babylonians invaded Judah, they deported most of its citizens to Babylon, where they lived as exiles. Cyrus the Great conquered Babylon and established the First Persian Empire in 539 BCE. One year later, according to traditional dating, Cyrus permitted the Judahites to return to their homeland. This homeland was renamed as the Province of Yehud, which eventually became a satrapy of Eber-Nari. This period is covered by the entirety of the Book of Daniel.

=== Persian period ===
In 537–520 BCE, Zerubbabel became Yehud's governor and started work on the Second Temple, which was stopped. In 520–516 BCE, Haggai and Zechariah goaded the Judahites to resume work on the Temple. Upon completion, Joshua became its high priest. In 458–433 BCE, Ezra and Nehemiah led another group of Judahites to Yehud, with Artaxerxes's permission. Nehemiah rebuilt the temple after some unspecified disaster and removed foreign influence from the Judahite community. That said, some Judahites elected to stay in Persia, where they almost faced annihilation. This period is covered by the entirety of the Book of Ezra, Book of Nehemiah, the Book of Esther, the Book of Haggai, the Book of Zechariah, and the Book of Malachi.

== Historical timeline ==
=== Emergence of the Israelite culture ===
Efforts to confirm the biblical ethnogenesis of Israel through archaeology have largely been abandoned as unfruitful. Many scholars see the traditional narratives as national myths with little historical value, but some posit that a small group of exiled Egyptians contributed to the Exodus narrative. (Note: "While there is a consensus among scholars that the Exodus did not take place in the manner described in the Bible, surprisingly most scholars agree that the narrative has a historical core and that some of the highland settlers came, one way or another, from Egypt ..." "Archaeology does not really contribute to the debate over the historicity or even historical background of the Exodus itself, but if there was indeed such a group, it contributed the Exodus story to that of all Israel. While I agree that it is most likely that there was such a group, I must stress that this is based on an overall understanding of the development of collective memory and of the authorship of the texts (and their editorial process). Archaeology, unfortunately, cannot directly contribute (yet?) to the study of this specific group of Israel's ancestors.") William G. Dever cautiously identifies this group with the Tribe of Joseph, while Richard Elliott Friedman identifies it with the Tribe of Levi. Josephus quoting Manetho identifies them with the Hyksos. Other scholars believe that the Exodus narrative was a "collective memory" of several events from the Bronze Age.

In addition, it is unlikely that the Israelites overtook the southern Levant by force, according to archaeological evidence. Instead, they branched out of indigenous Canaanite peoples that long inhabited the region, which included Syria, ancient Israel, and the Transjordan region. Their culture was monolatristic, with a primary focus on Yahweh (or El) worship, but after the Babylonian exile, it became monotheistic, with partial influence from Zoroastrianism. The latter decisively separated the Israelites from other Canaanites. The Israelites used the Canaanite script and communicated in a Canaanite language known as Biblical Hebrew. The language's modern descendant is today the only surviving dialect of the Canaanite languages. Genetic studies show that contemporary ethnicities in the Levant were, like Israel, distinguished by their unique cultures, due to their descent from a common ancestral stock.

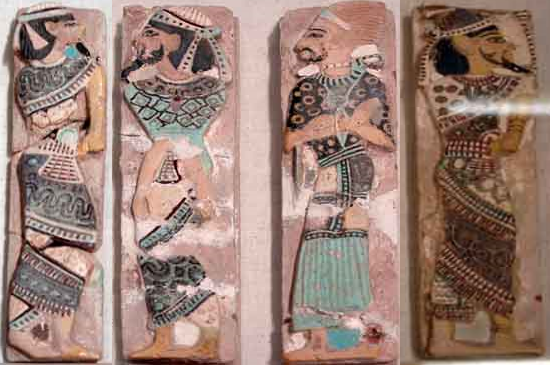
Ramesses III prisoner tiles depicting precursors of the Israelites in Canaan: Canaanites from city-states and a Shasu leader.

Several theories exist for the origins of historical Israelites. Some believe they descend from raiding groups, itinerant nomads such as Habiru and Shasu or impoverished Canaanites, who were forced to leave wealthy urban areas and live in the highlands. Gary Rendsburg argues that some archaic biblical traditions and other circumstantial evidence point to the Israelites emerging from the Shasu and other seminomadic peoples from the desert regions south of the Levant, later settling in the highlands of Canaan. The prevailing academic opinion is that the Israelites were a mixture of peoples predominately indigenous to Canaan, with additional input from an Egyptian matrix of peoples, which most likely inspired the Exodus narrative. Israel's demographics were similar to the demographics of Ammon, Edom, Moab and Phoenicia.

Israelite cultural identity was defined by a sense of a shared memory of a collective past in the story of Exodus. Cultural boundaries were marked by ritual practices involving body, food, and time, including male circumcision, avoidance of pork consumption and marking time based on the Exodus, the reigns of Israelite kings, and Sabbath observance. The first two practices were observed by neighbouring west Semites besides the Philistines, who were of Mycenaean Greek origin. As a result, intermarriage with other Semites was common. But what distinguished Israelite circumcision from non-Israelite circumcision was its emphasis on 'correct' timing. Israelite circumcision also served as a mnemonic sign for the circumcised, where their 'unnatural' erect circumcised penis would remind them to behave differently in sexual matters. Yom-Tov Lipmann-Muhlhausen suggests that Israelite identity was based on faith and adherence to sex-appropriate commandments. For men, it was circumcision. For women, it was ritual (animal) sacrifice after childbirth (Leviticus 12:6).

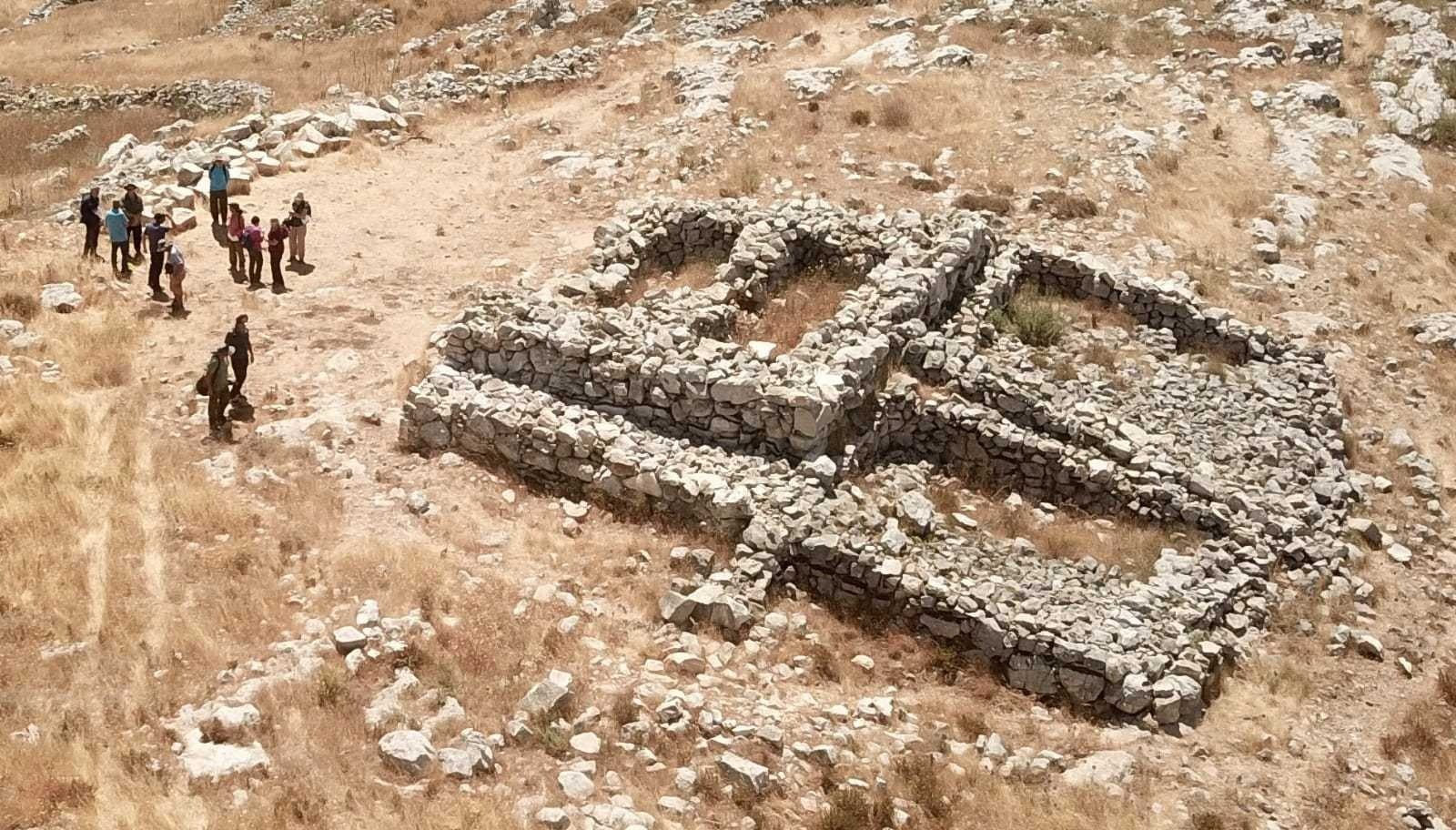
The Mount Ebal structure, seen by many archaeologists as an early Israelite cultic site

Genealogy was another ethnic marker. While it was likely that Israelite identity was not exclusively based on blood descent, the Israelites used genealogical self-definition to engage in cultural narcissism, though also in self-representation of impropriety and guilt, as shown in the story of their occasionally morally challenging ancestor, Jacob, a man of blessing and promise but also one who "suffers for his triumphs and pays a price for taking the name 'Israel'". This ambiguous characterization foreshadows "the complexities of the Jewish soul".

Names were significant in Israelite culture and indicated one's destiny and inherent character. Thus, a name change indicated a 'divine transformation' in one's 'destines, characters and natures'. These beliefs aligned with the Near Eastern cultural milieu, where names were 'intimately bound up with the very essence of being and inextricably intertwined with personality'.

In terms of appearance, rabbis described the Biblical Jews as being "midway between black and white" and having the "color of the boxwood tree". Assuming Yurco's debated claim that the Israelites are depicted in reliefs from Merneptah's temple at Karnak is correct, the early Israelites may have wore the same attire and hairstyles as non-Israelite Canaanites. Dissenting from this, Anson Rainey argued that the Israelites in the reliefs looked more similar to the Shasu. Based on biblical literature, it is implied that the Israelites distinguished themselves from peoples like the Babylonians and Egyptians by not having long beards and chin tufts. However, these fashion practices were upper class customs.

==== Early highland settlements in Canaan ====
In the 12th century BCE, many Israelite settlements appeared in the central hill country of Canaan, which was formerly an open terrain. These settlements lacked evidence of pork consumption, compared to Philistine settlements, had four-room houses and lived by an egalitarian ethos, which was exemplified by the absence of elaborate tombs, governor's mansions, certain houses being bigger than others etc. They followed a mixed economy, which prioritized self-sufficiency, cultivation of crops, animal husbandry and small-scale craft production. New technologies such as terraced farming, silos for grain storage and cisterns for rainwater collection were simultaneously introduced.

These settlements were built by inhabitants of the "general Southland" (i.e. modern Sinai and the southern parts of Israel and Jordan), who abandoned their pastoral-nomadic ways. Canaanites who lived outside the central hill country were tenuously identified as Danites, Asherites, Zebulunites, Issacharites, Naphtalites and Gadites. These inhabitants do not have a significant history of migration besides the Danites, who allegedly originate from the Sea Peoples, particularly the Dan(an)u. Nonetheless, they intermingled with the former nomads, due to socioeconomic and military factors. Their interest in Yahwism and its concern for the underprivileged was another factor. Possible allusions to this historical reality in the Hebrew Bible include the aforementioned tribes, except for Issachar and Zebulun, descending from Bilhah and Zilpah, who were viewed as "secondary additions" to Israel.

El worship was central to early Israelite culture but currently, the number of El worshippers in Israel is unknown. It is more likely that different Israelite locales held different views about El and had 'small-scale' sacred spaces.

Himbaza et al. (2012) states that Israelite households were typically ill-equipped to handle conflicts between family members, which may explain the harsh sexual taboos enforced against acts like incest, homosexuality, polygamy etc. in Leviticus 18–20. While the death penalty was legislated for these 'secret crimes', they functioned as a warning, where offenders would confess out of fear and make appropriate reparations.

=== Historicity of the United Monarchy ===
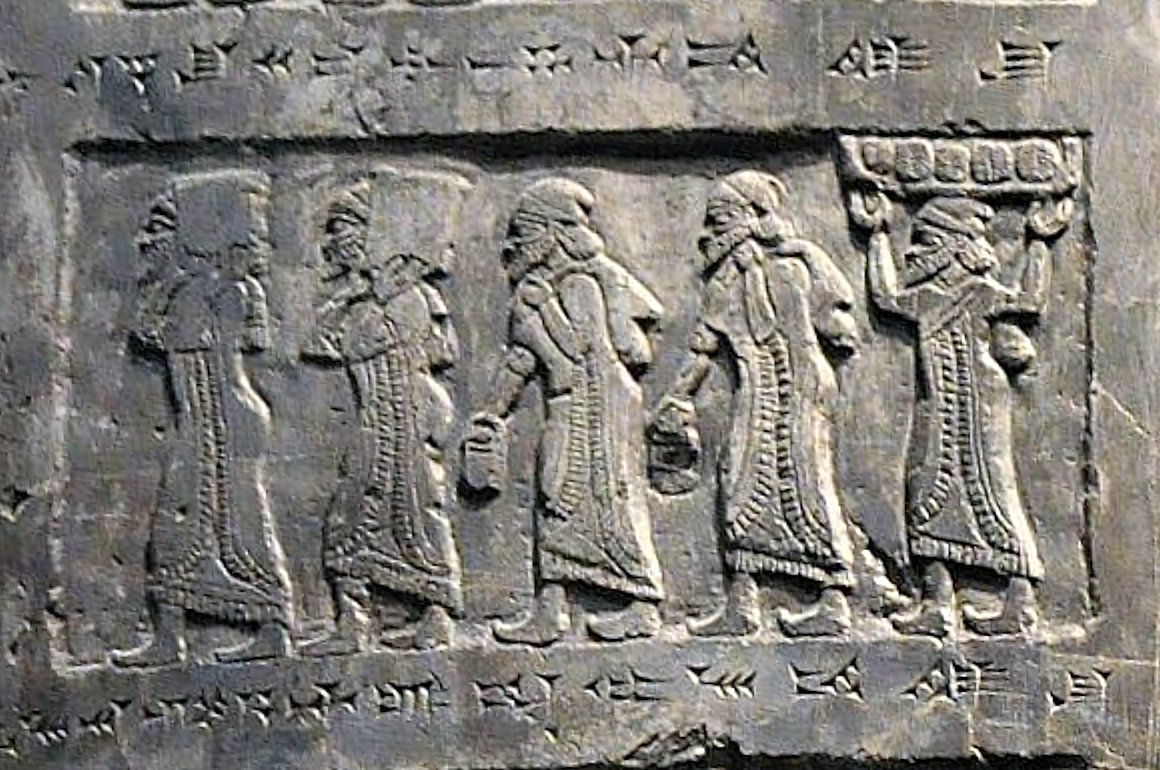
Part of the gift-bearing Israelite delegation of King Jehu, Black Obelisk, 841–840 BCE.

The historicity of the United Monarchy is heavily debated among archaeologists and biblical scholars: biblical maximalists and centrists (Kenneth Kitchen, William G. Dever, Amihai Mazar, Baruch Halpern and others) argue that the biblical account is more or less accurate, while biblical minimalists (Israel Finkelstein, Ze'ev Herzog, Thomas L. Thompson and others) argue that Israel and Judah never split from a singular state. The debate has not been resolved, but recent archaeological discoveries by Eilat Mazar and Yosef Garfinkel show some support for the existence of the United Monarchy.

From 850 BCE onwards, a series of inscriptions mention the "House of David". They came from Israel's neighbours.

=== Kingdoms of Israel and Judah ===
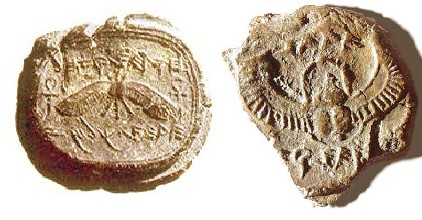
"To Hezekiah, son of Ahaz, king of Judah" – royal seal found at the Ophel excavations in Jerusalem

Compared to the United Monarchy, the historicity of the Kingdom of Israel and Judah is widely accepted by historians and archaeologists. Their destruction by the Assyrians and Babylonians respectively is also confirmed by archaeological evidence and extrabiblical sources.

Christian Frevel argues that Yahwism was rooted in the culture of the Kingdom of Israel, who introduced it to the Kingdom of Judah via Ahab's expansions and sociopolitical cooperation, which was prompted by Hazael's conquests. Frevel has also argued that Judah was a 'vassal-like' state to Israel, under the Omrides. This theory has been rejected by other scholars, who argue that the archaeological evidence seems to indicate that Judah was an independent socio-political entity for most of the 9th century BCE.

Avraham Faust argues that there was continued adherence to the 'ethos of egalitarianism and simplicity' in the Iron Age II (10th-6th century BCE). For example, there is minimal evidence of temples and complex tomb burials, despite Israel and Judah being more densely populated than the Late Bronze Age. Four-room houses remained the norm. In addition, royal inscriptions were scarce, along with imported and decorated pottery. According to William G. Dever, Israelite identity in the 9th-8th centuries BCE can be identified through a combination of archaeological and cultural traits that distinguish them from their neighbours. These traits include being born and living within the territorial borders of Israel or Judah, speaking Hebrew, living in specific house types, using locally produced pottery, and following particular burial practices. Israelites were also part of a rural kin-based society, and adhered to Yahwism, though not necessarily in a monotheistic way. Their material culture was simple but distinct, and their societal organization was centered around family and inheritance. These traits, while shared with some neighbouring peoples, were uniquely Israelite in their specific combination.

==== Wars with Assyria and Babylonia ====
The Kingdom of Israel was conquered by the Neo-Assyrian Empire around 720 BCE. The records of Sargon II of Assyria indicate that he deported part of the population to Assyria. Some Israelites migrated to the southern kingdom of Judah, while those that remained in Samaria, concentrated mainly around Mount Gerizim, developed a new ethnic identity as Samaritans. Foreign groups were also settled by the Assyrians in the territories of the conquered kingdom. Research indicates that only a portion of the surviving Israelite population intermarried with Mesopotamian settlers. In their native Samaritan Hebrew, the Samaritans identify as "Israel", "B'nai Israel" or "Shamerim/Shomerim" (i.e. "Guardians/Keepers/Watchers"). Despite this, belief in the Ten Lost Tribes of Israel emerged because of the heavy assimilation faced by Samarian deportees.

Towards the end of the same century, the Neo-Babylonian Empire emerged victorious over the Assyrians, leading to Judah's subjugation as a vassal state. In the early 6th century BC, a series of revolts in Judah prompted the Babylonian king Nebuchadnezzar II to lay siege to and destroy Jerusalem along with the First Temple, marking the kingdom's demise. Subsequently, a segment of the Judahite populace was exiled to Babylon in several waves. Judeans were progenitors of the Jewish people, who practised Second Temple Judaism during the Second Temple period.

=== Persian period ===
With the fall of Babylon to the rising Achaemenid Persian Empire, king Cyrus the Great issued a proclamation known as the Edict of Cyrus, encouraging the exiles to return to their homeland after the Persians raised it as an autonomous Jewish-governed province named Yehud. Under the Persians (c. 539–332 BCE), the returned Jewish population restored the city and rebuilt the Temple in Jerusalem. The Cyrus Cylinder is controversially cited as evidence for Cyrus allowing the Judeans to return. The returnees showed a "heightened sense" of their ethnic identity and shunned exogamy, which was treated as a "permissive reality" in Babylon. Circumcision was no longer a significant ethnic marker, with increased emphasis on genealogical descent or faith in Yahweh. Jason A. Staples argues that the majority of contemporary Jews, regardless of theology, wished for the reunion of northern Israelites and southern Jews and did not completely appropriate the Israel identity for themselves.

=== Hellenistic period ===
In 332 BCE, the Achaemenid Empire fell to Alexander the Great, and the region was later incorporated into the Ptolemaic Kingdom (c. 301–200 BCE) and the Seleucid Empire (c. 200–167 BCE). The Maccabean Revolt against Seleucid rule ushered in a period of nominal independence for the Jewish people under the Hasmonean dynasty (140–37 BCE). Initially operating semi-autonomously within the Seleucid sphere, the Hasmoneans gradually asserted full independence through military conquest and diplomacy, establishing themselves as the final sovereign Jewish rulers before a prolonged hiatus in Jewish sovereignty in the region. Some scholars argue that Jews also engaged in active missionary efforts in the Greco-Roman world, which led to conversions. Several scholars, such as Scot McKnight and Martin Goodman, reject this view while holding that conversions occasionally occurred. A similar diaspora existed for Samaritans but their existence is poorly documented.

=== Roman period ===
In 63 BCE, the Roman Republic conquered the kingdom. In 37 BCE, the Romans appointed Herod the Great as king of a vassal Judea. In 6 CE, Judea was fully incorporated into the Roman Empire as the province of Judaea. During this period, the main areas of Jewish settlement in the Land of Israel were Judea, Galilee and Perea, while the Samaritans had their demographic center in Samaria. Growing dissatisfaction with Roman rule and civil disturbances eventually led to the First Jewish–Roman War (66–73 CE), resulting in the destruction of Jerusalem and its Temple, which ended the Second Temple period. This event marked a cataclysmic moment in Jewish history, prompting a reconfiguration of Jewish identity and practice to ensure continuity. The cessation of Temple worship and disappearance of Temple-based sects facilitated the rise of Rabbinic Judaism, which stemmed from the Pharisaic school of Second Temple Judaism, emphasizing communal synagogue worship and Torah study, eventually becoming the predominant expression of Judaism. Concurrently, Christianity began to diverge from Judaism, evolving into a predominantly Gentile religion. Decades later, the Bar Kokhba revolt (132–135 CE) further diminished the Jewish presence in Judea, leading to a geographical shift of Jewish life to Galilee and Babylonia, with smaller communities scattered across the Mediterranean.

== Genetic studies and descendants ==
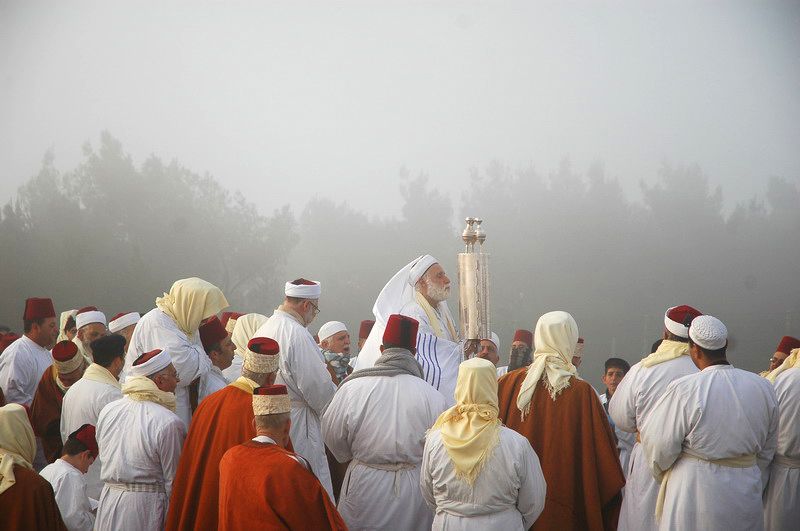
Samaritans' Passover pilgrimage on Mount Gerizim.

As of 2024, only one study has directly examined ancient Israelite genetic material. The analysis examined First Temple-era skeletal remains excavated in Abu Ghosh, and showed one male individual belonging to the J2 Y-DNA haplogroup, a set of closely related DNA sequences thought to have originated in the Caucasus or Eastern Anatolia, as well as the T1a and H87 mitochondrial DNA haplogroups, the former of which has also been detected among Canaanites, and the latter in Basques, Tunisian Arabs, and Iraqis, suggesting a Mediterranean, Near Eastern, or perhaps Arabian origin.

A 2004 study (by Shen et al.) comparing Samaritans to several Jewish populations (including Ashkenazi Jews, Iraqi Jews, Libyan Jews, Moroccan Jews, and Yemenite Jews) found that "the principal components analysis suggested a common ancestry of Samaritan and Jewish patrilineages. Most of the former may be traced back to a common ancestor in what is today identified as the paternally inherited Israelite high priesthood (Cohanim), with a common ancestor projected to the time of the Assyrian conquest of the kingdom of Israel."

A 2020 study (by Agranat-Tamr et al.) stated that there was genetic continuity between the Bronze Age and Iron Age southern Levantines, which included the Israelites and Judahites. They could be "modeled as a mixture of local earlier Neolithic populations and populations from the northeastern part of the Near East (e.g. Zagros Mountains, Caucasians/Armenians and possibly, Hurrians)". Reasons for the continuity include resilience from the Bronze Age collapse, which was mostly true for inland cities such as Tel Megiddo and Tel Abel Beth Maacah. Elsewhere, European-related and East African-related components were added to the population, from a north-south and south-north gradient respectively. Late Neolithic and Bronze Age Europeans and Somalis were used as representatives.

A 2025 study (by Lipson et al.) suggested that the patrilineal origins of ancient Israelites were likely to be genetically heterogeneous. In addition, various Y haplogroups of ancient Near Eastern origin associated with the Cohanim were due to non-patrilineal descendants of Cohanim adopting the Cohanim identity. They might've arose due to sporadic coupling with non-Cohenite Judeans, marriage with converted foreigners such as Babylonians or Greco-Romans, or perhaps from non-paternity events. However, at least two Cohen branches (CB-01 and CB-02) appear to trace back to 'early 1st millennium BCE priestly ancestors'.

=== Modern Levantine groups with Israelite ancestry ===
Samaritans and Jews descend from the Israelites. With regard to the Jewish diaspora, it is held that each Jewish community originates from exiled Israelite settlement in various parts of the world, particularly as a result of the Jewish–Roman wars. It is also argued that some Palestinian people are similarly descended from those Israelites who were not exiled from the region and who consequently converted to Christianity under the Byzantine Empire and then to Islam following the Arab conquest of the Levant, except for Palestinian Jews and present-day Samaritans.

=== Non-Levantine groups claiming Israelite ancestry ===
Largely owing to the spread of Christianity and Islam globally, several groups of people outside of the Levant have claimed Israelite ancestry on an ethnic or racial basis. These various non-Levantine groups include Mandaeans, Pashtuns, British Israelists, Black Hebrew Israelites, Igbos, Mormons, and the Christian Identity movement. The phenomenon became especially prevalent after the founding of the State of Israel in 1948, as the country's Law of Return grants citizenship to qualified Jews and to non-Jews who are either married to a Jew or provide sufficient evidence of having Jewish ancestry.

== See also ==
- Hebrews
  - Twelve Tribes of Israel
- Genetic history of the Middle East
  - Genetic studies of Jews
  - Genetic studies of Samaritans
- Demographic history of Palestine (region)
  - History of the Jews and Judaism in the Land of Israel
- Groups claiming affiliation with the Israelites
