= Samaria =

Region of ancient Israel

- Region
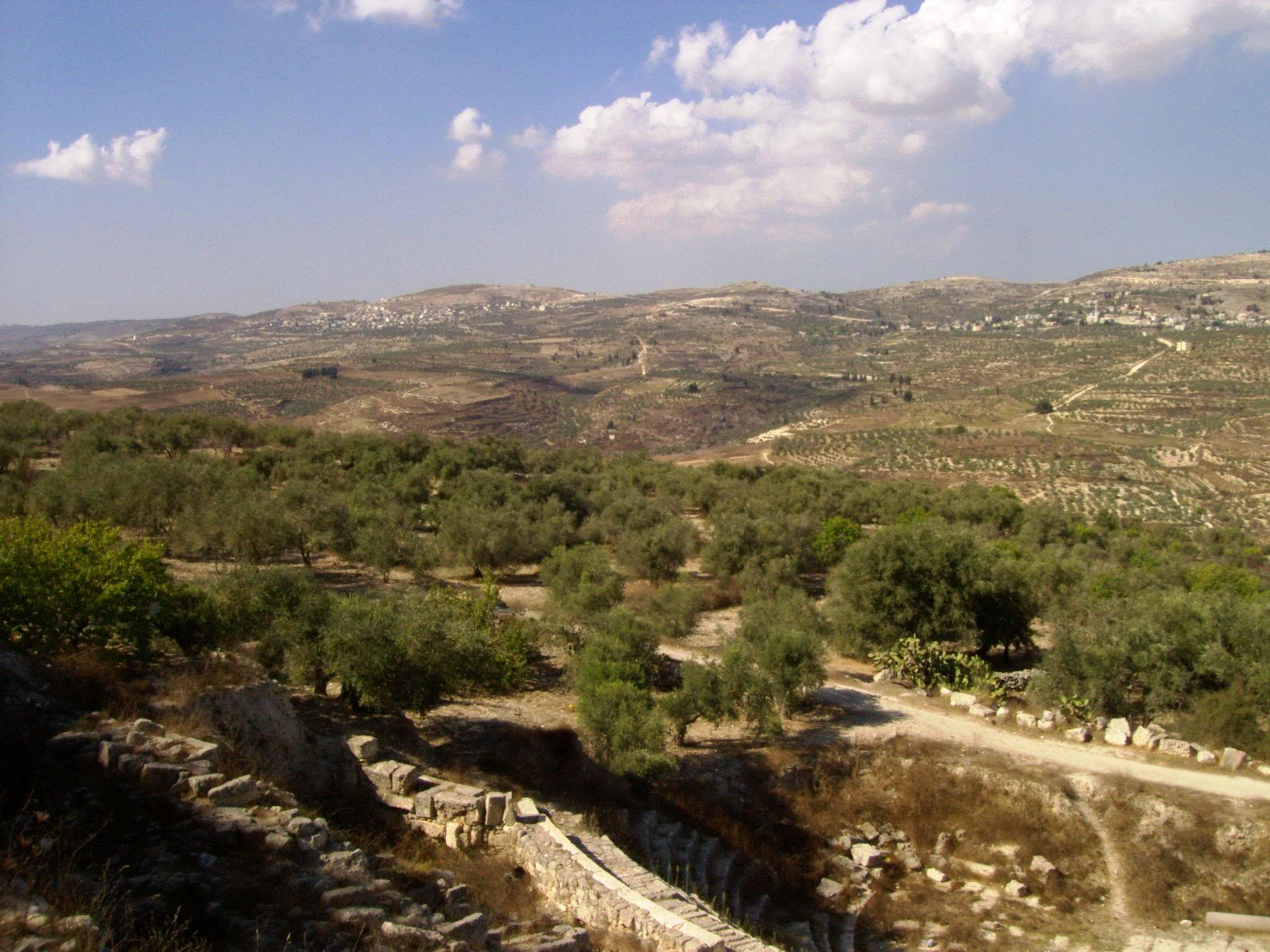
- Hills near the ruins of Samaria
- Interactive map of Samaria
- Coordinates: 32.275°N 35.190°E
- Part of: Israel; West Bank, Palestine
- Highest elevation: 1,016 m (3,333 ft) (Tall Asur (Ba'al Hazor))
- Designation: السامرة, שֹׁומְרוֹן

Samaria (/səˈmæriə, -ˈmɛəriə/), the Hellenized form of the Hebrew name Shomron (Hebrew: שֹׁמְרוֹן, romanized: Šōmrōn), is used as a historical and biblical name for the central region of the Land of Israel. It is bordered by Judea to the south, Galilee to the north, the Jordan River to the east, and the Mediterranean Sea to the west. The region is known in Arabic under two names, Samirah (Arabic: السَّامِرَة, as-Sāmira), and Mount Nablus (جَبَل نَابُلُس Jabal Nābulus).

The first-century historian Josephus set the Mediterranean Sea as its limit to the west, and the Jordan River as its limit to the east. Its territory largely corresponds to the biblical allotments of the tribe of Ephraim and the western half of Manasseh. It includes most of the region of the ancient Kingdom of Israel, which was north of the Kingdom of Judah. The border between Samaria and Judea, while historically fluid, is set at the latitude of Ramallah.

The name "Samaria" is derived from the ancient city of Samaria, capital of the northern Kingdom of Israel. The name Samaria likely began to be used for the entire kingdom not long after the town of Samaria had become Israel's capital, but it is first documented after its conquest by the Neo-Assyrian Empire, which incorporated the land into the province of Samerina.

Samaria was used to describe the northern midsection of the land in the UN Partition Plan for Palestine in 1947. It became the administrative term in 1967, when the West Bank was defined by Israeli officials as the Judea and Samaria Area, of which the entire area north of the Jerusalem District is termed as Samaria. In 1988, Jordan ceded its claim of the area to the Palestine Liberation Organization (PLO). In 1994, control of Areas "A" (full civil and security control by the Palestinian Authority) and "B" (Palestinian civil control and joint Israeli–Palestinian security control) were transferred by Israel to the Palestinian Authority. The Palestinian Authority and the international community do not recognize the term "Samaria"; in modern times, the territory is generally known as part of the West Bank.

== Etymology ==
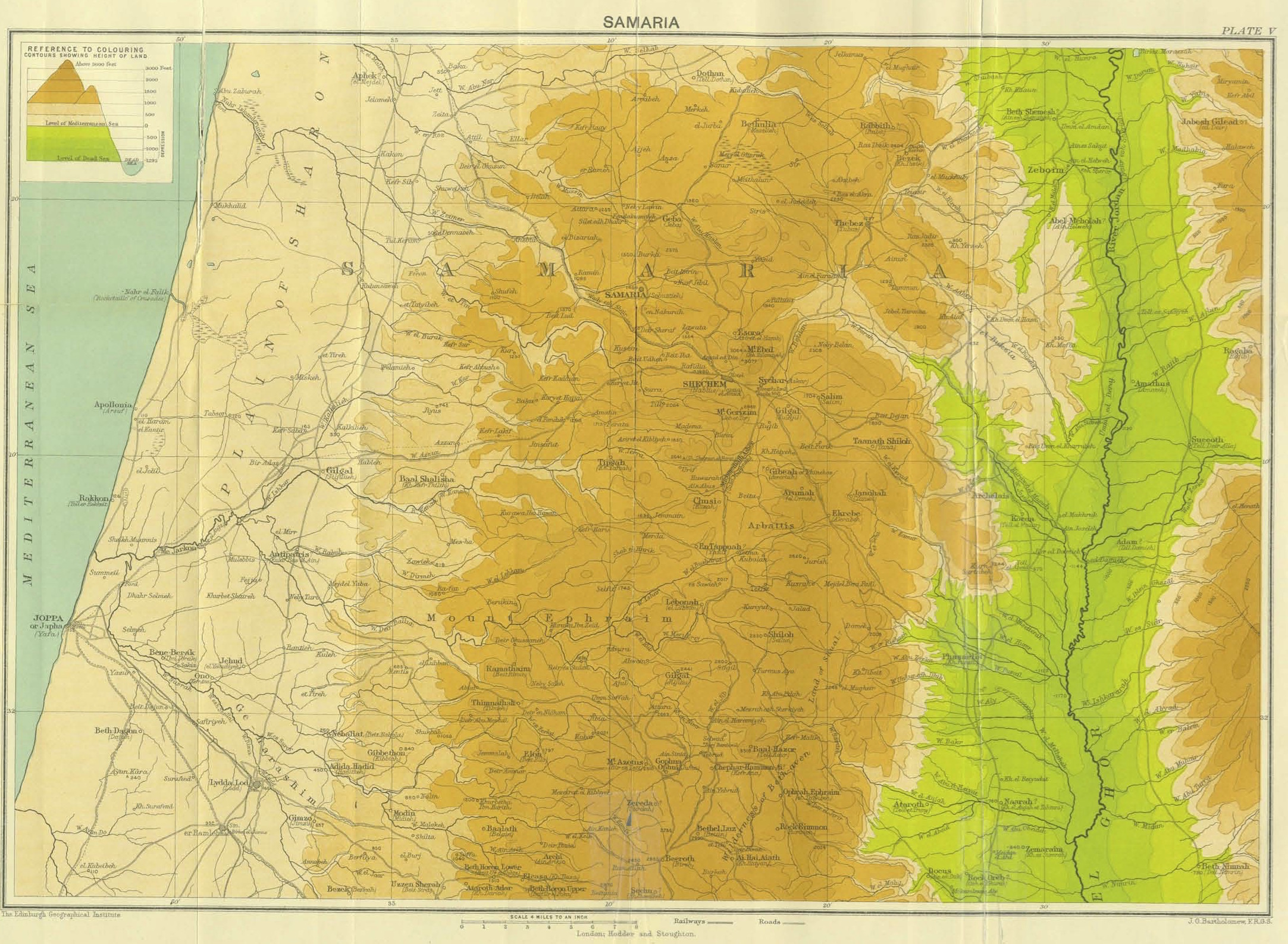
Map of Samaria by J.G. Bartholomew in 1894 book by George Adam Smith

According to the Hebrew Bible, the Hebrew name "Shomron" (Hebrew: שֹׁומְרוֹן) is derived from the individual (or clan) Shemer (Hebrew: שֶׁמֶר), from whom King Omri (ruled 880s–870s BCE) purchased the hill on which he built his new capital city of Shomron.

The fact that the mountain was called Shomron when Omri bought it may indicate that the correct etymology of the name is to be found more directly in the Semitic root for "guard", hence its initial meaning would have been "watch mountain". In the earlier cuneiform inscriptions, Samaria is designated under the name of "Bet Ḥumri" ("the house of Omri"); but in those of Tiglath-Pileser III (ruled 745–727 BCE) and later it is called Samirin, after its Aramaic name, Shamerayin.

== Historical boundaries ==
=== Northern kingdom to Hellenistic period ===
In Nelson's Encyclopaedia (1906–1934), the Samaria region in the three centuries following the fall of the northern kingdom of Israel, i.e. during the Assyrian, Babylonian, and Persian periods, is described as a "province" that "reached from the [Mediterranean] sea to the Jordan Valley".

=== Roman-period definition ===
The classical Roman-Jewish historian Josephus wrote:

(4) Now as to the country of Samaria, it lies between Judea and Galilee; it begins at a village that is in the great plain called Ginea, and ends at the Acrabbene toparchy, and is entirely of the same nature with Judea; for both countries are made up of hills and valleys, and are moist enough for agriculture, and are very fruitful. They have abundance of trees, and are full of autumnal fruit, both that which grows wild, and that which is the effect of cultivation. They are not naturally watered by many rivers, but derive their chief moisture from rain-water, of which they have no want; and for those rivers which they have, all their waters are exceeding sweet: by reason also of the excellent grass they have, their cattle yield more milk than do those in other places; and, what is the greatest sign of excellency and of abundance, they each of them are very full of people. (5) In the limits of Samaria and Judea lies the village Anuath, which is also named Borceos. This is the northern boundary of Judea.

During the first century, the boundary between Samaria and Judea passed eastward of Antipatris, along the deep valley which had Beth Rima (now Bani Zeid al-Gharbia) and Beth Laban (today's al-Lubban al-Gharbi) on its southern, Judean bank; then it passed Anuath and Borceos, identified by Charles William Wilson (1836–1905) as the ruins of 'Aina and Khirbet Berkit; and reached the Jordan Valley north of Acrabbim and Sartaba. Tall Asur also stands at that boundary.

== Geography ==
The area known as the hills of Samaria is bounded by the Jezreel Valley(north); by the Jordan Rift Valley (east); by the Sharon plain (west); and by the Jerusalem mountains (south). It includes Mount Carmel, Mount Gilboa, Mount Ebal, and Mount Gerizim.

The highest peak of the Samarian hills is Mount Ebal at 935 m (3,068 ft). Samaria's climate is more hospitable than the climate further south.

There is no clear division between the mountains of southern Samaria and northern Judea.

== History ==
The region of Samaria has been ruled by a succession of polities. In Late Bronze Age Canaan, its city-states were under Egyptian suzerainty. In the Iron Age the region was settled by the Israelites and became the heartland of the Kingdom of Israel. The Neo-Assyrian Empire conquered the kingdom around 720 BCE, and the region later passed to the Neo-Babylonian Empire and, from the 6th century BCE, to the Achaemenid Persian Empire. After Alexander the Great's conquest in 332 BCE, it was ruled by the Ptolemies and then the Seleucids. Hasmonean Judea annexed it in the late 2nd century BCE, and Rome took control after Pompey's campaign of 63 BCE, ruling it first through client kings and then as part of the province of Judaea (later Syria Palaestina). Under Byzantine rule, which began in the 4th century CE, the region saw recurrent Samaritan revolts. In the 7th century, it came under Muslim rule, and was governed by successive caliphates (Rashidun, Umayyad, Abbasid, Fatimid), the Seljuks, and briefly the Crusader Kingdom of Jerusalem. It was later held by the Ayyubids and Mamluks, and then by the Ottoman Empire from 1516 until 1917.

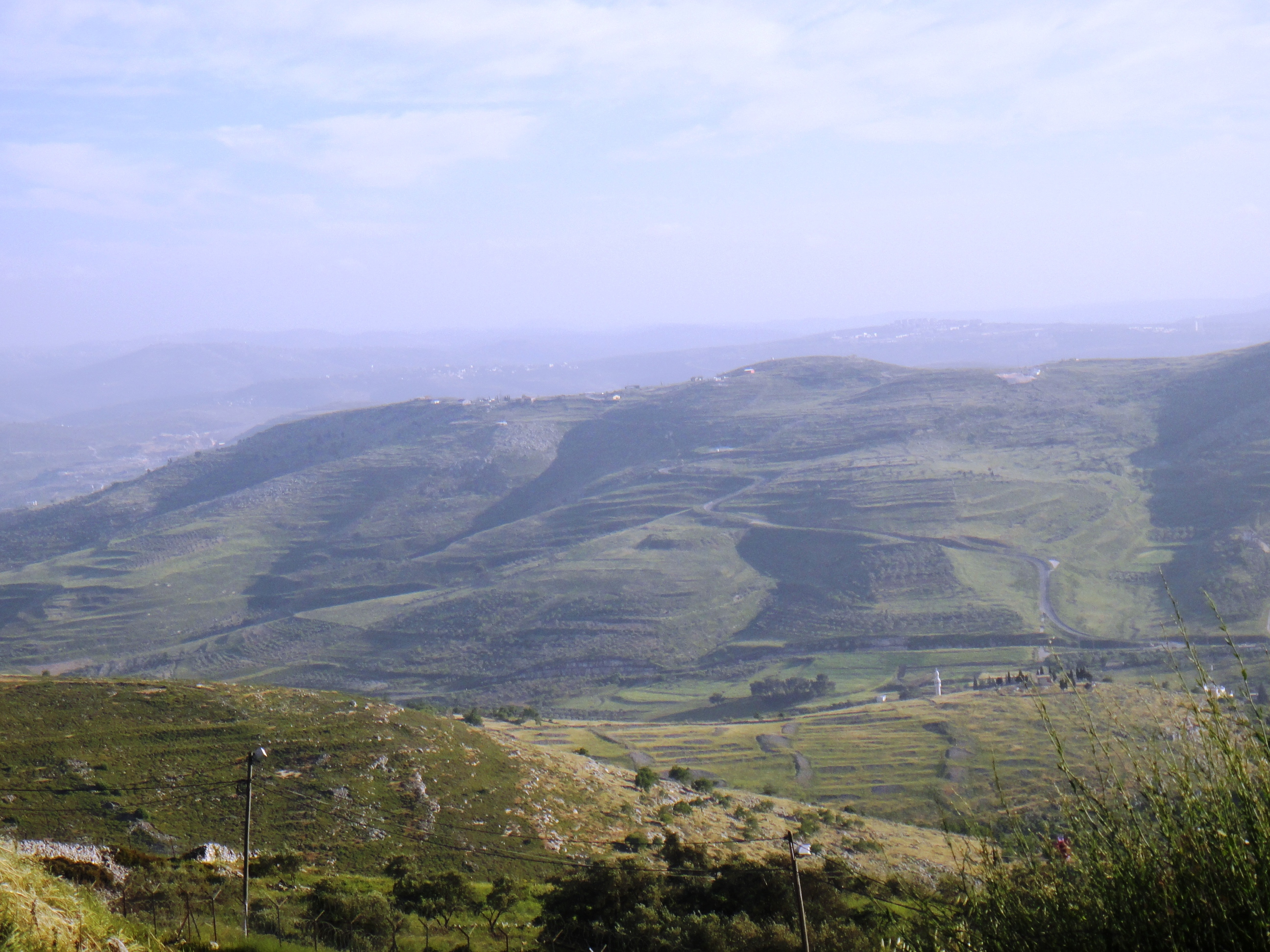
Hills of Samaria, near Yitzhar

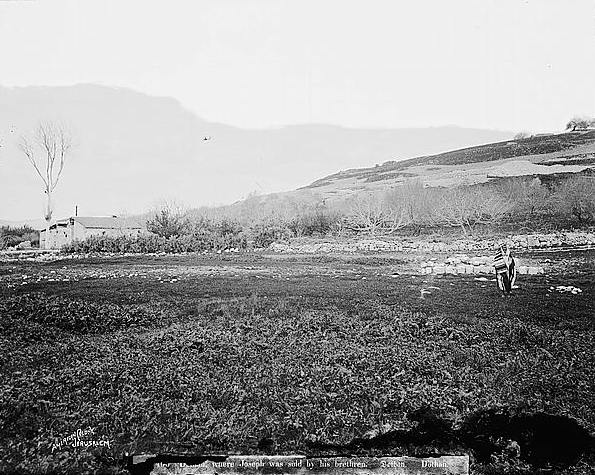
Site of Dothan where, according to the Book of Genesis, Joseph was sold by his brethren

=== Israelite tribes and kingdoms ===
According to the Hebrew Bible, the Israelites captured the region known as Samaria from the Canaanites and assigned it to the Tribe of Joseph. The southern part of Samaria was then known as Mount Ephraim. After the death of King Solomon (c. 931 BC), the northern tribes, including Ephraim and Menashe, separated themselves politically from the southern tribes and established the separate Kingdom of Israel. Initially its capital was Tirzah until the time of King Omri (c. 884 BC), who built the city of Samaria and made it his capital. Samaria functioned as the capital of the Kingdom of Israel (the "Northern Kingdom") until its fall to the Assyrians in the 720s. Hebrew prophets condemned Samaria for its "ivory houses" and luxury palaces displaying pagan riches.

The archaeological record suggests that Samaria experienced significant settlement growth in Iron Age II (from c. 950 BC). Archaeologists estimate that there were 400 sites, up from 300 during the previous Iron Age I (c. 1200 BC onwards). The people dwelt on tells, in small villages, farms, and forts, and in the cities of Shechem, Samaria and Tirzah in northern Samaria. Zertal estimated that about 52,000 people inhabited the Manasseh Hill in northern Samaria prior to the Assyrian deportations. According to botanists, the majority of Samaria's forests were torn down during the Iron Age II, and were replaced by plantations and agricultural fields. Since then, few oak forests have grown in the region.

=== Assyrian period ===
The Neo-Assyrian Empire under Shalmaneser V and the deportation of peoples from Samerina by Sargon II (and possibly Shalmaneser V)

In the 720s, the conquest of Samaria by Shalmaneser V of the Neo-Assyrian Empire, which culminated in the three-year siege of the capital city of Samaria, saw the territory annexed as the Assyrian province of Samerina. The siege has been tentatively dated to 725 or 724 BC, with its resolution in 722 BC, near the end of Shalmaneser's reign. The first documented mention of the province of Samerina is from the reign of Shalmaneser V's successor Sargon II. This is also the first documented instance where a name derived from "Samaria", the capital city, was used for the entire region, although it is thought likely that this practice was already in place.

Following the Assyrian conquest, Sargon II claimed in Assyrian records to have deported 27,280 people to various places throughout the empire, mainly to Guzana in the Assyrian heartland, as well as to the cities of the Medes in the eastern part of the empire (modern-day Iran). The deportations were part of a standard resettlement policy of the Neo-Assyrian Empire to deal with defeated enemy peoples. The resettled people were generally treated well as valued members of the empire and transported together with their families and belongings. At the same time, people from other parts of the empire were resettled in the depopulated Samerina. The resettlement is also called the Assyrian captivity in Jewish history and provides the basis for the narrative of the Ten Lost Tribes.

=== Babylonian and Persian periods ===
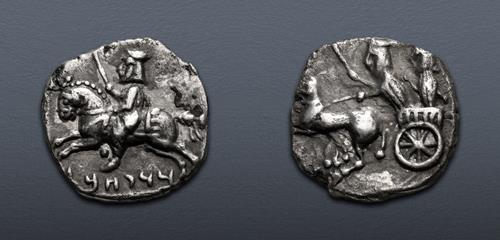
Persian Achaemenid coin minted in Samaria, dated c. 375–333 BC. Left; Persian satrap holding lance and reins on horseback, Aramaic inscription BDYḤBL below. Right; satrap and driver in chariot drawn by two horses

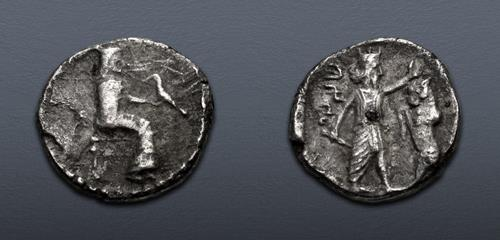
Persian Achaemenid coin minted in Samaria, dated c. 375–333 BC. Left; a seated Persian wearing tiara and holding bird. Right; Persian king standing, holding dagger and bull by its horn, flanked by an Aramaic inscription which reads ŠMRY

According to many scholars, archaeological excavations at Mount Gerizim indicate that a Samaritan temple was built there in the first half of the 5th century BCE. The date of the schism between Samaritans and Jews is unknown. Much of the anti-Samaritan polemic in the Hebrew Bible and extra-biblical texts (such as Josephus) originate from this point and on.

=== Hellenistic period ===
During the Hellenistic period, Samaria was largely divided between a Hellenizing faction based around the town of Samaria and a pious faction in Shechem and surrounding rural areas, led by the High Priest.

Samaria was a largely autonomous province nominally dependent on the Seleucid Empire. However, the province gradually declined as the Maccabean movement and Hasmonean Judea grew stronger. The transfer of three districts of Samaria— Ephraim, Lod and Ramathaim—under the control of Judea in 145 BCE as part of an agreement between Jonathan Apphus and Demetrius II is one indication of this decline. Around 110 BCE, the decline of Hellenistic Samaria was complete, when the Jewish Hasmonean ruler John Hyrcanus destroyed the cities of Samaria and Shechem, as well as the city and temple on Mount Gerizim. Only a few stone remnants of the Samaritan temple exist today.

=== Roman period ===
In 6 CE, Samaria became part of the Roman province of Iudaea, following the death of King Herod the Great.

Southern Samaria reached a peak in settlement during the early Roman period (63 BCE–70 CE), partly as a result of the Hasmonean dynasty's settlement efforts. The impact of the Jewish–Roman wars is archaeologically evident in Jewish-inhabited areas of southern Samaria, as many sites were destroyed and left abandoned for extended periods of time. After the First Jewish-Roman War, the Jewish population of the area decreased by around 50%, whereas after the Bar Kokhba revolt, it was completely wiped out in many areas. According to Klein, the Roman authorities replaced the Jews with a population from the nearby provinces of Syria, Phoenicia, and Arabia. An apparent new wave of settlement growth in southern Samaria, most likely by non-Jews, can be traced back to the late Roman and Byzantine eras.

==== New Testament references ====
The New Testament mentions Samaria in Luke 17:11–2, in the miraculous healing of the ten lepers, which took place on the border of Samaria and Galilee. John 4:1-26 records Jesus' encounter at Jacob's Well with the woman of Sychar, in which he declares himself to be the Messiah. In Acts 8:1, it is recorded that the early community of disciples of Jesus began to be persecuted in Jerusalem and were 'scattered throughout the regions of Judea and Samaria'. Philip went down to the city of Samaria and preached and healed the sick there. In the time of Jesus, Iudaea of the Romans was divided into the toparchies of Judea, Samaria, Galilee and the Paralia. Samaria occupied the centre of Iudaea. (Iudaea was later renamed Syria Palaestina in 135, following the Bar Kokhba revolt.) In the Talmud, Samaria is called the "land of the Cuthim".

=== Byzantine period ===
Following the bloody suppression of the Samaritan Revolts (mostly in 525 CE and 555 CE) against the Byzantine Empire, which resulted in death, displacement, and conversion to Christianity, the Samaritan population dramatically decreased. In the central parts of Samaria, the vacuum left by departing Samaritans was filled by nomads who gradually became sedentarized.

The Byzantine period is considered the peak of settlement in Samaria, as in other regions of the country. Based on historical sources and archeological data, the Manasseh Hill surveyors concluded that Samaria's population during the Byzantine period was composed of Samaritans, Christians, and a minority of Jews. The Samaritan population was mainly concentrated in the valleys of Nablus and to the north as far as Jenin and Kfar Othenai; they did not settle south of the Nablus-Qalqiliya line. Christianity slowly made its way into Samaria, even after the Samaritan revolts. With the exception of Neapolis, Sebastia, and a small cluster of monasteries in central and northern Samaria, most of the population of the rural areas remained non-Christian. In southwestern Samaria, a significant concentration of churches and monasteries was discovered, with some of them built on top of citadels from the late Roman period. Magen raised the hypothesis that many of these were used by Christian pilgrims, and filled an empty space in the region whose Jewish population was wiped out in the Jewish–Roman wars.

=== Early Muslim, Crusader, Mamluk and Ottoman periods ===
Following the Muslim conquest of the Levant, and throughout the early Islamic period, Samaria underwent a process of Islamization as a result of waves of conversion among the remaining Samaritan population, along with the migration of Muslims into the area. Evidence implies that a large number of Samaritans converted under Abbasid and Tulunid rule, as a result of droughts, earthquakes, religious persecution, high taxes, and anarchy. By the mid-Middle Ages, the Jewish writer and explorer Benjamin of Tudela estimated that only around 1,900 Samaritans remained in Palestine and Syria.

==== Ottoman Period ====
During the Ottoman Period, the northern part of Samaria belonged to the Turabay Emirate (1517–1683), which encompassed also the Jezreel Valley, Haifa, Jenin, Beit She'an Valley, northern Jabal Nablus, Bilad al-Ruha/Ramot Menashe, and the northern part of the Sharon plain. The areas south of Jenin, including Nablus itself and its hinterland up to the Yarkon River, formed a separate district called the District of Nablus.

In the late 17th century, civil wars and unrest destabilized the Levant. To restore control, the Ottomans enforced population transfers to Palestine (sürgün). These relocations attempted to secure elite loyalty, rebuild war-torn areas, ease demographic pressures, repopulate uninhabited areas, and better deploy labor for imperial needs. Some of the exiled families, including the Banū Ghāzī (Qāsim and Rayyān) and the Shuqran (Jarrār and ʿAbd al-Hādī), replaced earlier rural elites in the Nablus highlands during the 18th and 19th centuries.

=== British Mandate ===
During the Great War, Palestine was wrested by the armies of the British Empire from the Ottoman Empire and in the aftermath of the war it was entrusted to the United Kingdom to administer as a League of Nations mandated territory Samaria was the name of one of the administrative districts of Palestine for part of this period. The 1947 UN partition plan called for the Arab state to consist of several parts, the largest of which was described as "the hill country of Samaria and Judea."

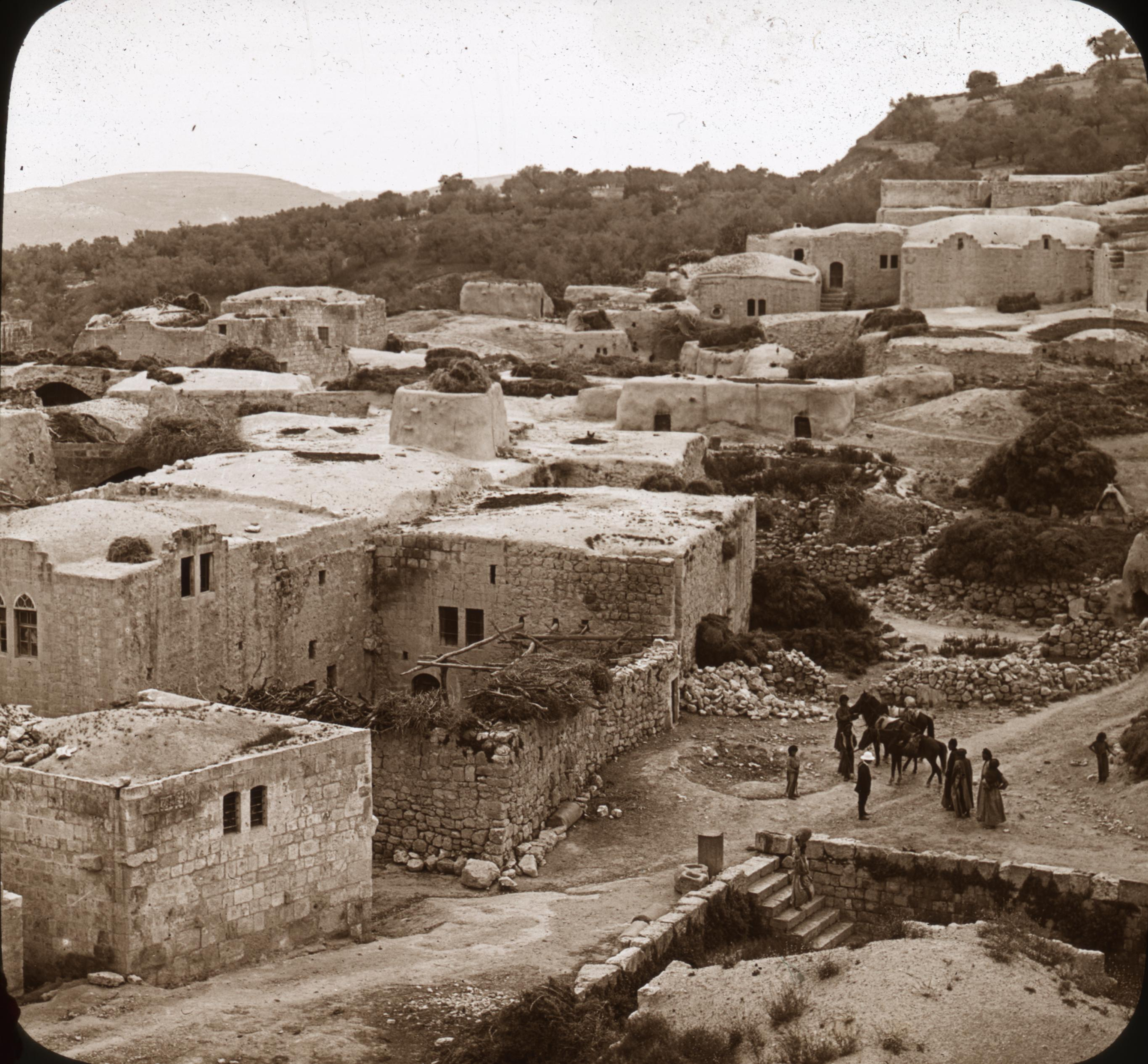
The village of Sebastiya (historical Samaria), c. 1915

=== Jordanian period ===
As a result of the 1948 Arab–Israeli War, most of the territory was unilaterally incorporated as Jordanian-controlled territory, and was administered as part of the West Bank (west of the Jordan river).

=== Israeli administration ===
The Jordanian-held West Bank was captured and has been occupied by Israel since the 1967 Six-Day War. Jordan ceded its claims in the West Bank (except for certain prerogatives in Jerusalem) to the PLO in November 1988, later confirmed by the Israel–Jordan Treaty of Peace of 1994. In the 1994 Oslo accords, the Palestinian Authority was established and given responsibility for the administration over some of the territory of West Bank (Areas 'A' and 'B').

Samaria is one of several standard statistical districts utilized by the Israel Central Bureau of Statistics. "The Israeli CBS also collects statistics on the rest of the West Bank and the Gaza District. It has produced various basic statistical series on the territories, dealing with population, employment, wages, external trade, national accounts, and various other topics." The Palestinian Authority however use Nablus, Jenin, Tulkarm, Qalqilya, Salfit, Ramallah and Tubas governorates as administrative centers for the same region.

The Shomron Regional Council is the local municipal government that administers the smaller Israeli towns (settlements) throughout the area. The council is a member of the network of regional municipalities spread throughout Israel. Elections for the head of the council are held every five years by Israel's ministry of interior, all residents over age 17 are eligible to vote. In special elections held in August 2015 Yossi Dagan was elected as head of the Shomron Regional Council.

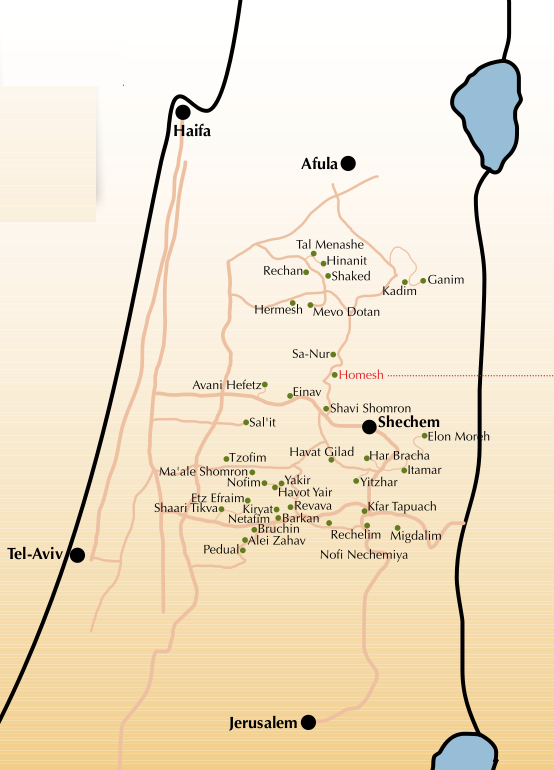
Map of Israeli settlements administered by the Shomron Regional Council in the West Bank

Israeli settlements in the West Bank are considered by most in the international community to be illegal under international law, though the United States and Israeli governments dispute this. In September 2016, the Town Board of the American Town of Hempstead in the State of New York, led by Councilman Bruce Blakeman entered into a partnership agreement with the Shomron Regional Council, led by Yossi Dagan, as part of an anti-Boycott, Divestment and Sanctions campaign.

== Archaeological sites ==
=== Ancient city of Samaria/Sebaste ===
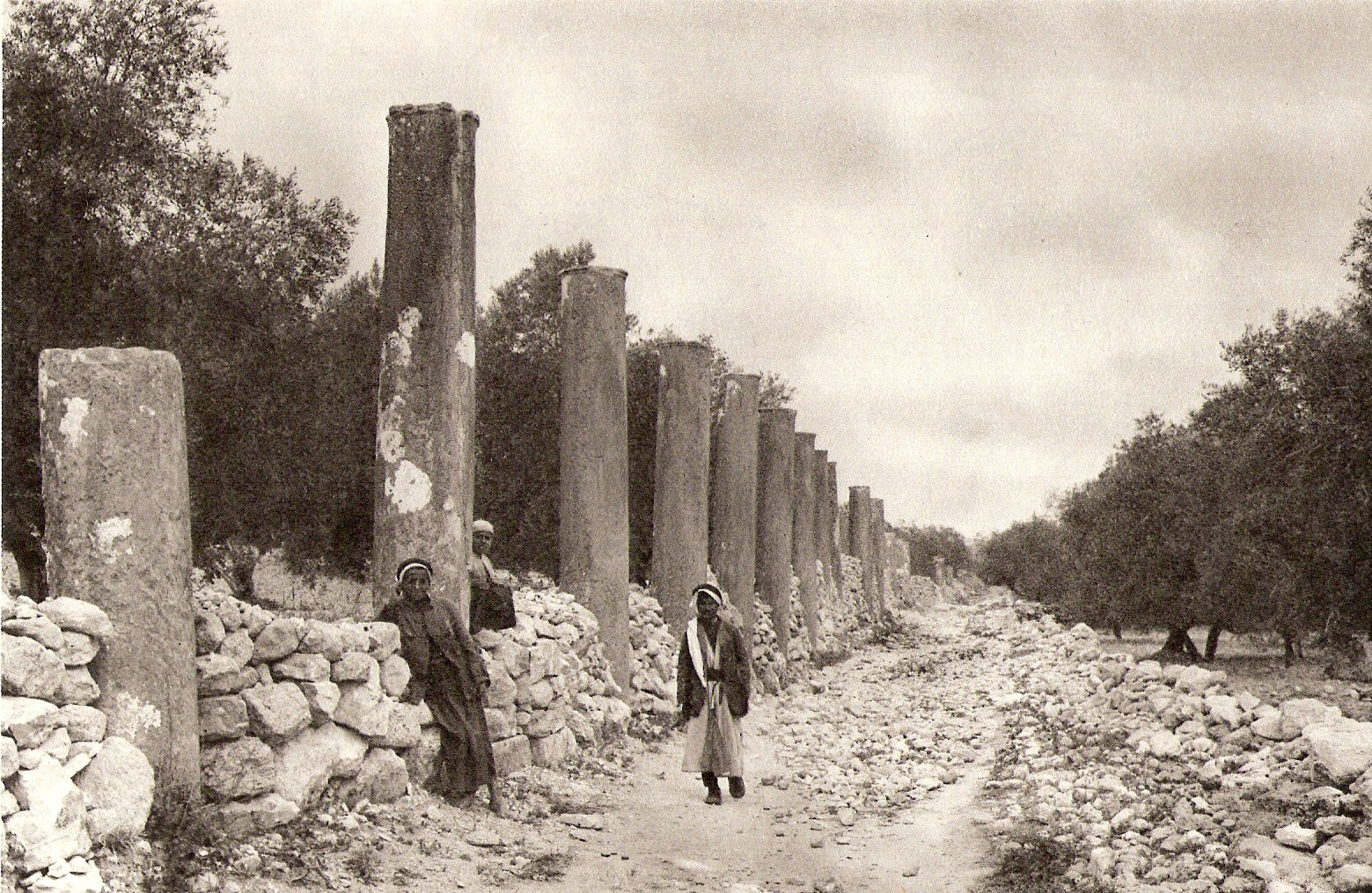
Tel Sebastia, 1925

The ancient site of Samaria-Sebaste covers the hillside overlooking the West Bank village of Sebastia on the eastern slope of the hill. Remains have been found from the Canaanite, Israelite, Hellenistic, Roman (including Herodian) and Byzantine periods.

Archaeological finds from Roman-era Sebaste, a site that was rebuilt and renamed by Herod the Great in 30 BC, include a colonnaded street, a temple-lined acropolis, and a lower city, where John the Baptist is believed to have been buried.

The Harvard excavation of Samaria, which began in 1908, was headed by Egyptologist George Andrew Reisner. The findings included Hebrew, Aramaic, cuneiform and Greek inscriptions, as well as pottery remains, coins, sculpture, figurines, scarabs and seals, faience, amulets, beads and glass. The joint British-American-Hebrew University excavation continued under John Winter Crowfoot in 1931–35, during which time some of the chronology issues were resolved. The round towers lining the acropolis were found to be Hellenistic, the street of columns was dated to the 3–4th century, and 70 inscribed potsherds were dated to the early 8th century.

In 1908–1935, remains of luxury furniture made of wood and ivory were discovered in Samaria, representing the Levant's most important collection of ivory carvings from the early first millennium BC. Despite theories of their Phoenician origin, some of the letters serving as fitter's marks are in Hebrew.

As of 1999 three series of coins have been found that confirm Sinuballat was a governor of Samaria. Sinuballat is best known as an adversary of Nehemiah from the Book of Nehemiah where he is said to have sided with Tobiah the Ammonite and Geshem the Arabian. All three coins feature a warship on the front, likely derived from earlier Sidonian coins. The reverse side depicts the Persian King in his kandys robe facing down a lion that is standing on its hind legs.

=== Other ancient sites ===
- The Bull Site, an Iron I cult site
- Tel Dothan near Jenin, identified with biblical Dothan
- Khirbet Kheibar, in Meithalun, ancient tell which was inhabited from the Middle Bronze Age to Medieval times
- Khirbet Kurkush, site of an ancient Samaritan or Jewish settlement with a notable necropolis
- Khirbet Samara, site of a notable ancient Samaritan synagogue
- Nablus area:
  - Mount Gerizim, the religious epicenter of Samaritanism, site of an ancient Samaritan temple, and Samaritan and Byzantine ruins
  - Mount Ebal site, Iron Age remains on Mount Ebal, seen by many scholars as an early Israelite cultic site
  - Tell Balata, identified as biblical Shechem
- Khirbet Seilun/Tel Shiloh, identified with Shiloh (biblical city)
- Tell el-Far'ah (North), identified with biblical Tirzah, the third capital of the northern Kingdom of Israel.

== Samaritans ==
The Samaritans (Hebrew: Shomronim) are an ethnoreligious group named after and descended from ancient Semitic inhabitants of Samaria, since the Assyrian exile of the Israelites, according to 2 Kings 17 and first-century historian Josephus. Religiously, the Samaritans are adherents of Samaritanism, an Abrahamic religion closely related to Judaism. Based on the Samaritan Torah, Samaritans claim their worship is the true religion of the ancient Israelites prior to the Babylonian exile, preserved by those who remained behind. Their temple was built at Mount Gerizim in the middle of the 5th century BCE, and was destroyed under the Hasmonean king John Hyrcanus of Judea in 110 BCE, although their descendants still worship among its ruins. The antagonism between Samaritans and Jews is important in understanding the Bible's New Testament stories of the "Samaritan woman at the well" and "Parable of the Good Samaritan". The modern Samaritans, however, see themselves as co-equals in inheritance to the Israelite lineage through Torah, as do the Jews, and are not antagonistic to Jews in modern times.

== Flora and fauna ==
The geographical region lies on the Irano-Turanian border, and its slopes support vegetation grown in that broad region. Typical for this region are maquis, the dense scrub vegetation consisting of hardy evergreen shrubs and small trees, characteristic of coastal regions in the Mediterranean and which, in this area, are found on the cliffs' step-crevices. The kermes oak (Quercus coccifera) is common.

In contrast to the Galilee and the Judean Mountains, there are very few remnants of natural vegetation in the Samaria Mountains. Large areas in the south and west of Samaria and in the valleys have been cultivated for many generations as agricultural land and are planted mainly with olive, fig, almond and pomegranate trees; the areas in the valleys are used for arable land or vegetable crops. Only on the edges of the fields and in places that have been regenerated and where damaging the plant-life is prohibited by law have remnants of natural vegetation been preserved.

The wildlife of Samaria, as in other regions of the country, consists of populations that invaded the general area at different times and adapted to the conditions prevailing in the area. Hunting (with the introduction of modern firearms in the 20th-century) and extensive farming have been the principal causes for a decline in the area's natural wildlife. The animals that dominate the general area have their origins in the Mediterranean basin and in Europe, such as the badger, the wild boar, the red fox, the hedgehog, the field mouse, and the mole (among mammals).

== See also ==
- Archevites
- Samaritan Revolts
- List of burial places of biblical figures
- Ahwat
- Judea and Samaria Area
