= Assyrian captivity =

Ancient Israelites relocated by the Neo-Assyrian Empire

Deportation of the Israelites after the destruction of Israel and the subjugation of Judah by the Neo-Assyrian Empire, 8th–7th century BCE

The Assyrian captivity, also called the Assyrian exile, is the period in the history of ancient Israel and Judah during which tens of thousands of Israelites from the Kingdom of Israel were dispossessed and forcibly relocated by the Neo-Assyrian Empire. One of many instances attesting Assyrian resettlement policy, this mass deportation of the Israelite nation began immediately after the Assyrian conquest of Israel, which was overseen by the Assyrian kings Tiglath-Pileser III and Shalmaneser V. The later Assyrian kings Sargon II and Sennacherib also managed to subjugate the Israelites in the neighbouring Kingdom of Judah following the Assyrian siege of Jerusalem in 701 BCE, but were unable to annex their territory outright. The Assyrian captivity's victims are known as the Ten Lost Tribes, and Judah was left as the sole Israelite kingdom until the Babylonian siege of Jerusalem in 587 BCE, which resulted in the Babylonian captivity of the Jewish people. Not all of Israel's populace was deported by the Assyrians; some of those who were not expelled from the former kingdom's territory eventually became known as the Samaritan people.

== Biblical account ==
The captivities began approximately in 732 BCE, according to modern scholarship.

And the God of Israel stirred up the spirit of Pul king of Assyria, and the spirit of Tilgathpilneser king of Assyria, and he carried them away, even the Reubenites, and the Gadites, and the half tribe of Manasseh, and brought them unto Halah, and Habor, and Hara, and to the river Gozan, unto this day. (1 Chronicles 5:26)

In the days of Pekah king of Israel came Tiglathpileser king of Assyria, and he took Ijon, and Abel-beth-maachah, and Janohah, and Kedesh and Hazor, and Gilead, and Galilee, all the land of Naphtali, and carried them captive to Assyria. (2 Kings 15:29)

In 722 BCE, around ten years after the initial deportations, the ruling city of the Northern Kingdom of Israel, Samaria, was finally taken by Sargon II after a three-year siege started by Shalmaneser V.

Against him came up Shalmaneser king of Assyria; and Hoshea became his servant, and gave him presents.

And the king of Assyria found conspiracy in Hoshea: for he had sent messengers to So king of Egypt, and brought no present to the king of Assyria, as he had done year by year: therefore the king of Assyria shut him up, and bound him in prison. Then the king of Assyria came up throughout all the land, and went up to Samaria, and besieged it three years.

In the ninth year of Hoshea the king of Assyria took Samaria, and carried Israel away into Assyria, and placed them in Halah and in Habor by the river of Gozan, and in the cities of the Medes. (2 Kings 17:3–6)

The king of Assyria carried the Israelites away to Assyria, settled them in Halah, on the Habor, the river of Gozan, and in the cities of the Medes, because they did not obey the voice of the LORD their God but transgressed His covenant—all that Moses the servant of the LORD had commanded; they neither listened nor obeyed. (2 Kings 18:11–12)

The term "cities of the Medes" mentioned above may be a corruption from an original text "Mountains of Media".

And when Asa heard these words, even the prophecy of Oded the prophet, he took courage, and put away the detestable things out of all the land of Judah and Benjamin, and out of the cities which he had taken from the hill-country of Ephraim; and he renewed the altar of the LORD, that was before the porch of the LORD.

And he gathered all Judah and Benjamin, and them that sojourned with them out of Ephraim and Manasseh, and out of Simeon; for they fell to him out of Israel in abundance, when they saw that the LORD his God was with him.

So they gathered themselves together at Jerusalem in the third month, in the fifteenth year of the reign of Asa. (2 Chronicles 15:8–10)

Many Israelite civilians were killed during the invasion, with infants being dashed and pregnant women being ripped open (Hosea 13:16). Similar acts were perpetrated in later Assyrian conquests, such as their conquest of Elam.

According to 2 Chronicles 30, there is evidence that at least some people in the Northern Kingdom of Israel were not exiled. These were invited by King Hezekiah to keep the Passover in a feast at Jerusalem with the Judean population. (The holiday was set one month forward from its original date.) Hezekiah sent runners or "posts" with letters to spread the word among the remnant of the Northern kingdom; the runners were mocked during their visit to the country of Ephraim, Manasseh, and Zebulun. However, some people from Asher, Manasseh, and Zebulun humbled themselves and came to Jerusalem. In a later part of the chapter, even people from the Tribe of Issachar and the strangers that "came out from the land of Israel" were said to take part in the passover event. Biblical scholars such as Umberto Cassuto and Elia Samuele Artom claim that Hezekiah might have annexed these territories, which were inhabited by the Kingdom of Israel, into his own kingdom.

And Hezekiah sent to all Israel and Judah, and wrote letters also to Ephraim and Manasseh, that they should come to the house of the LORD at Jerusalem, to keep the passover unto the LORD, the God of Israel. (2 Chronicles 30:1)

So they established a decree to make proclamation throughout all Israel, from Beer-sheba even to Dan, that they should come to keep the passover unto the LORD, the God of Israel, at Jerusalem; for they had not kept it in great numbers accordingly, as it is written.

So the runners went with the letters from the king and his princes throughout all Israel and Judah, according to the commandment of the king, saying: 'Ye children of Israel, turn back unto the LORD, the God of Abraham, Isaac, and Israel, that He may return to the remnant that are escaped out of the hand of the kings of Assyria. And be ye not like your fathers and like your brethren who acted treacherously against the LORD, the God of their fathers, so that He delivered them to desolation, as ye see. Now be ye not stiffnecked as your fathers were, but yield yourselves unto the LORD and enter into His sanctuary which He hath sanctified for ever; and serve the LORD your God that His fierce anger may turn away from you. For if ye turn back unto the LORD, your brethren and your children shall find compassion before them that led them captive, and shall come back into this land; for the LORD your God is gracious and merciful, and will not turn away His face from you if ye return unto Him.' (2 Chronicles 30:5–9)

So the posts passed from city to city through the country of Ephraim and Manasseh, even unto Zebulun; but they laughed them to scorn, and mocked them. Nevertheless certain men of Asher and Manasseh and of Zebulun humbled themselves, and came to Jerusalem. (2 Chronicles 30:11–12)

For a multitude of the people, even many of Ephraim and Manasseh, Issachar and Zebulun, had not cleansed themselves, yet did they eat the passover otherwise than it is written. For Hezekiah had prayed for them, saying: 'The good LORD pardon ...' (2 Chronicles 30:18)

And all the congregation of Judah, with the priests and the Levites, and all the congregation that came out of Israel, and the strangers that came out of the land of Israel, and that dwelt in Judah, rejoiced. So there was great joy in Jerusalem; for since the time of Solomon, the son of David, king of Israel, there was not the like in Jerusalem. (2 Chronicles 30:25–26)

In 2 Chronicles, Chapter 31, it is said that the remnant of the Kingdom of Israel returned to their homes, but not before destroying Ba'al and Ashera's places of Idol worship left in "all Judah and Benjamin, in Ephraim also and Manasseh".

Now when all this was finished, all Israel that were present went out to the cities of Judah, and broke in pieces the pillars, and hewed down the Asherim, and broke down the high places and the altars out of all Judah and Benjamin, in Ephraim also and Manasseh, until they had destroyed them all. Then all the children of Israel returned, every man to his possession, into their own cities. (2 Chronicles 31:1)

== Assyrian cuneiform ==
The Babylonian Chronicle ABC1 records that Shalmaneser V conquered Samaria, as stated in the Bible. Likewise, Assyrian cuneiform states that 27,290 captives were taken from Samaria, the capital of the new Assyrian province of Samerina, by Sargon II.

Sargon records his first campaign on the walls of the royal palace at Dur-Sharrukin (Khorsabad):

In my first year of reign *** the people of Samaria *** to the number of 27,290 ... I carried away.

Fifty chariots for my royal equipment I selected. The city I rebuilt. I made it greater than it was before.

People of the lands I had conquered I settled therein. My official (Tartan) I placed over them as governor. (L.ii.4.)

The description of the final defeat of the Northern Kingdom of Israel above appears to be a minor event in Sargon's legacy. Some historians attribute the ease of Israel's defeat to the previous two decades of invasions, defeats, and deportations.

Some estimates assume a captivity numbering in the hundreds of thousands, minus those who died in defense of the kingdom and minus those who fled voluntarily before and during the invasions. It has also been suggested that the numbers deported by the Assyrians were rather limited and the bulk of the population remained in situ. There is also evidence that significant numbers fled south to the Kingdom of Judah. Archaeologically speaking, it is known that the invasion was accompanied by large-scale destruction and abandonment at many sites. There are also some cuneiform texts that document the presence of Israelites in Assyria after the deportations.

== Modern scholarship ==
Contemporary scholarship confirms that deportations occurred both before and after the Assyrian conquest of the Kingdom of Israel in 722–720 BCE, with varying impacts across Galilee, Transjordan, and Samaria. During the earlier Assyrian invasions, Galilee and Transjordan experienced significant deportations, with entire tribes vanishing; the tribes of Reuben, Gad, Dan, and Naphtali are never again mentioned. Archaeological evidence from these regions shows that a large depopulation process took place there in the late 8th century BCE, with numerous sites being destroyed, abandoned, or feature a long occupation gap. In contrast, some scholars argue that Samaria—a larger and more populated area—presents a more mixed picture. While some sites were destroyed or abandoned during the Assyrian invasion, major cities such as Samaria and Megiddo remained largely intact, and other sites show a continuity of occupation. Other scholars argue that archaeological findings from Samaria show that the territory as a whole—except for a few small areas—was devastated following the Assyrian conquest. The Assyrians settled exiles from Babylonia, Elam, and Syria in places including Gezer, Hadid, and villages north of Shechem and Tirzah. However, even if the Assyrians deported 30,000 people, as they claimed, many would have remained in the area. Based on changes in material culture, Adam Zertal estimated that only 10% of the Israelite population in Samaria was deported, while the number of imported settlers was likely no more than a few thousand, indicating that most Israelites continued to reside in Samaria.

Archaeologist Eric H. Cline believes only 10–20% of Samaria's Israelite population (i.e. 40,000 Israelites) were deported to Assyria in 720 BCE. About 80,000 Israelites fled to Judah whilst between 100,000 and 230,000 Israelites remained in Samaria. The latter intermarried with the foreign settlers, thus forming the Samaritans. By contrast, Avraham Faust argues that the population in all the former territories of the kingdom of Israel was reduced to between 20,000 and 40,000 inhabitants by the 7th century BCE.

== Return ==
Unlike the Kingdom of Judah, which was allowed to return from its Babylonian captivity, the ten tribes of the Northern Kingdom never had a foreign edict granting permission to return and rebuild their homeland. Many centuries later, rabbis of the restored Kingdom of Judah were still debating the return of the lost ten tribes.

According to the Books of Chronicles chapter 9 verse 3, the Israelites, who took part in the Return to Zion, are stated to be from the Tribe of Judah alongside the Tribe of Simeon that was absorbed into it, the Tribe of Benjamin, the Tribe of Levi (Levites and Priests) alongside the tribes of Ephraim and Manasseh, which according to the Book of Kings 2 Chapter 17 were exiled by the Assyrians (the Biblical scholars Umberto Cassuto and Elia Samuele Artom claimed these two tribes' names to be a reference to the remnant of all Ten Tribes that was not exiled and absorbed into the Judean population).

And in Jerusalem dwelt of the children of Judah, and of the children of Benjamin, and of the children of Ephraim and Manasseh. (1 Chronicles 9:3)

Nonetheless, Nehemiah chapter 11 verse 3 describes a group called "Israel" settling in Judean neighborhoods. This "Israel" was composed of various Israelite tribes, who intermarried with each other. In contrast, the Israelite tribes of Judah and Benjamin settled in Jerusalem.

== Sources ==
- Faust, Avraham (2021). The Neo-Assyrian Empire in the Southwest: Imperial Domination and Its Consequences. Oxford University Press. ISBN 978-0-19-884163-0. OCLC 1164505801.
- Tobolowsky, Andrew (2022). "The Tribes That Were Not Lost: The Samaritans". The Myth of the Twelve Tribes of Israel: New Identities Across Time and Space. Cambridge: Cambridge University Press. ISBN 978-1-316-51494-8.
