= Resettlement policy of the Neo-Assyrian Empire =

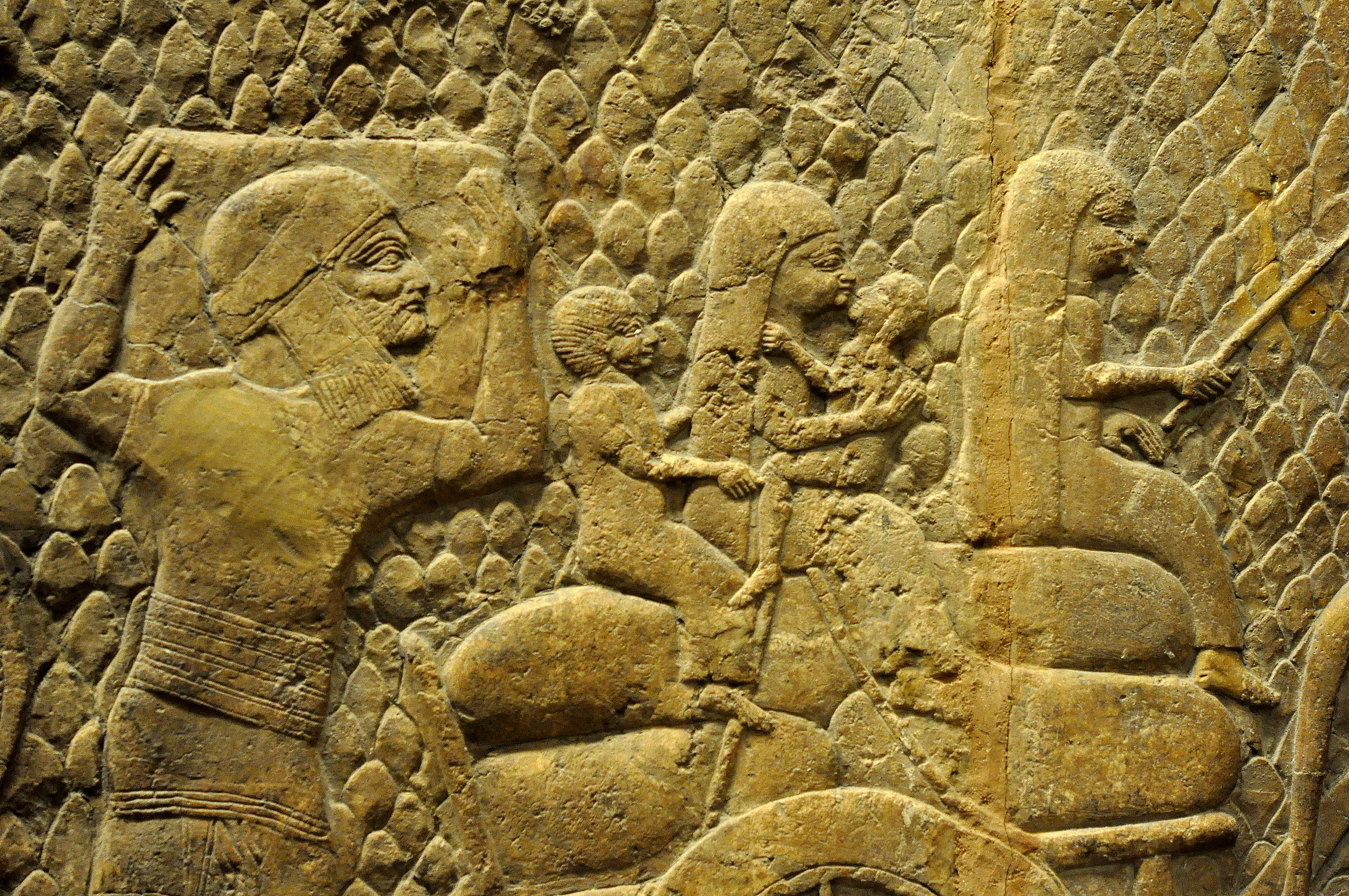
Judahites being deported following the Assyrian siege of Lachish in 701 BCE, depicted on a wall relief from the South-West Palace at Nineveh in modern-day Iraq.

For a period of three centuries beginning with the reign of Ashur-dan II (934–912 BCE), the Neo-Assyrian Empire maintained a policy of enforcing population transfer within the territories that it controlled and conquered. The majority of these displacements were carried out with careful planning by governing forces in order to strengthen the empire's rule and influence. For example, a population might have been moved around to spread agricultural techniques or develop new lands. In several cases, this policy was used as a punishment for political enemies—largely as a pragmatic alternative to mass execution. In other cases, elites of a conquered territory were meticulously selected and imported to the Neo-Assyrian Empire to enrich and increase the knowledge in the state's centre.

Professor Bustenay Oded of Haifa University estimated in 1979 that about 4.4 million people (± 900,000) were transferred by the ancient Assyrians over the course of some 250 years. Perhaps the best known of these population transfers occurred after the Kingdom of Israel fell to the Neo-Assyrian Empire in 720 BCE, resulting in the Ten Lost Tribes.

== Objectives ==
=== Deportation of conquered populations ===
Forced deportation and subsequent resettlement were used as tools of political domination and subjugation to maintain control over conquered people groups. Large population groups were systematically transferred between different regions within the empire to strengthen their political unity or put down possible rebellions. Imperial administrators planned the population transfers, taking into account political, economic, and cultural considerations. For example, people might have been moved to develop new lands. In 720 BCE, Sargon II resettled 6,300 Assyrians who were involved in a power struggle against him from the heartland of the empire to the newly conquered city of Hamat in Syria. By ordering resettlement instead of execution of his enemies, the king displayed his mercy, political threats were removed from the empire's center, and the deportees were also beneficial in the reconstruction of the war-torn city.

=== Importation of subjugated elites and skilled workers ===
In other cases, Assyria also relocated people from newly conquered territories to its heartland. Typically, the elite section of the population was selected in a careful process. This group included highly skilled people: craftsmen, scholars and cultural elites, whose resettlement in the empire's heartland would bring knowledge and wealth. The empire's capitals, Nineveh, Kalhu and Assur were well-populated with people from throughout the empire, who were instrumental in the building of Assyria's lasting monuments, including the famous Royal Library of Ashurbanipal.

== Logistics ==
The Assyrian state supervised and planned the move to be as efficient as possible. The deportees were meant to arrive intact, ready to work and resettle in their new environment. Some surviving Assyrian art depicts deportees traveling with their family and possessions with beasts of burden in tow, while other pieces depict the displaced peoples marching while shackled or tied up, or while being pulled along with hooks placed in their cheeks or noses. Ride animals were used, as well as boxes and vessels to carry supplies needed for resettlement. State officials were directly involved, for example a letter from an official to Tiglath-pileser III showed that the official provided the "food supplies, clothes, a waterskin, [...] shoes and oil" and was waiting for donkeys to be available before sending a convoy of deportees.

=== Magnitude ===
A 1979 estimate by Bustenay Oded—extrapolating based on written documents—estimated that 4.4 million people, plus or minus 900,000, were relocated over a 250-year period. 85% of them were resettled in the Assyrian heartland.

== Status of deportees ==
Surviving documents do not speak directly to the social and legal status of deportees, but historians attempted to infer them indirectly, especially from documents mentioning people with non-Assyrian names in Assyrian heartlands—presumably many of such people were deportees. The treatment of the deportees varied from case to case and it is hard to generalize, often those who were untrained were enslaved and put to work on massive building projects, while those who worked in various professions were placed to work according to their training. Those who worked in agriculture were assigned lands to work on, with a similar status to that of others within the empire. Many worked in high-skilled jobs, including as craftsmen, scholars, and merchants. The most educated and trained deportees were placed in royal service, and those willing to adopt the Assyrian identity and gods were able to join the Assyrian military. The state encouraged the mixing of deportees and native inhabitants where they lived in order to abolish their previous ethnic and religious identity in favor of a new shared "Assyrian" identity.

=== Biblical events ===
The resettlement of Israelites conquered by the Neo-Assyrian Empire were mentioned in the Old Testament, which came to be called the "Assyrian captivity". The first occurred in 734 BCE and is related in 2 Kings 15:29. The Assyrian King Tiglath-Pileser III defeated an alliance which included King Pekah of Israel, occupied Northern Israel and then ordered a large number of Israelites to relocate to Assyria proper. The second deportation started after 722 BCE and related in 2 Kings 18:11–12. Pekah's successor King Hoshea rebelled against Assyria in 724 BCE. King Shalmaneser V (Tiglath-Pileser's successor) besieged Samaria, which was finally captured in 722 BCE by Shalmaneser's successor Sargon II. After the fall of Samaria, 27,280 people (according to Assyrian records) were deported to various places throughout the empire, mainly to Guzana in the Assyrian heartland, as well as to the cities of the Medes in the eastern part of the empire (modern-day Iran). The cities of the Medes were only conquered by Assyria in 716 BCE, six years after the fall of Samaria, suggesting that the relocation took years to plan before it was implemented. At the same time, people from other parts of the empire were resettled in the depopulated areas of the then Assyrian province of Samerina.

== Legacy ==
As the successor of Assyrian hegemony, the Neo-Babylonian Empire continued the practice of moving conquered populations to other parts of the empire, with yet another well-known case being that of the Kingdom of Judah, whose populace was subject to the Babylonian captivity until the Babylonians themselves were conquered by the Persians in 539 BCE.

== See also ==
- Demographic engineering
- Divide and rule
- Land of Kir
