= Samerina =

Assyrian province (c. 722 – c. 609 BCE)

Samerina 𒊓𒈨𒊑𒈾
- Province of the Neo-Assyrian Empire
- 722 BC–609 BC
- Capital: Samaria
- Area
  - Coordinates: 32°15′N 35°10′E
- Historical era: Axial Age
  - Assyrian captivity: 722 BC
  - Babylonian conquest: 609 BC
Preceded by	Succeeded by
Kingdom of Israel	Samaria, Persian province
- Today part of: Israel, Palestine

Samerina (Akkadian: 𒊓𒈨𒊑𒈾 Samerina) was the province of the Neo-Assyrian Empire established following the c. 722 BC Assyrian conquest of Samaria by Shalmaneser V, which resulted in the dissolution of the Kingdom of Israel and annexation of Samaria into the empire as a full imperial province administered by a governor.

The rule of the expansive Neo-Assyrian Empire went largely unchallenged for the next century until the rise of the Neo-Babylonian Empire brought about the total collapse of Assyrian power by 609, resulting in Assyrian properties, including the province of Samerina, passing into Babylonian control.

Among other effects, Assyrian rule resulted in significant population transfers into and out of Samerina as part of the standing policy of resettlement within the Assyrian empire, and close to 30,000 inhabitants of Samerina were deported to other parts of the empire, with other peoples resettled in Samerina.

== History ==
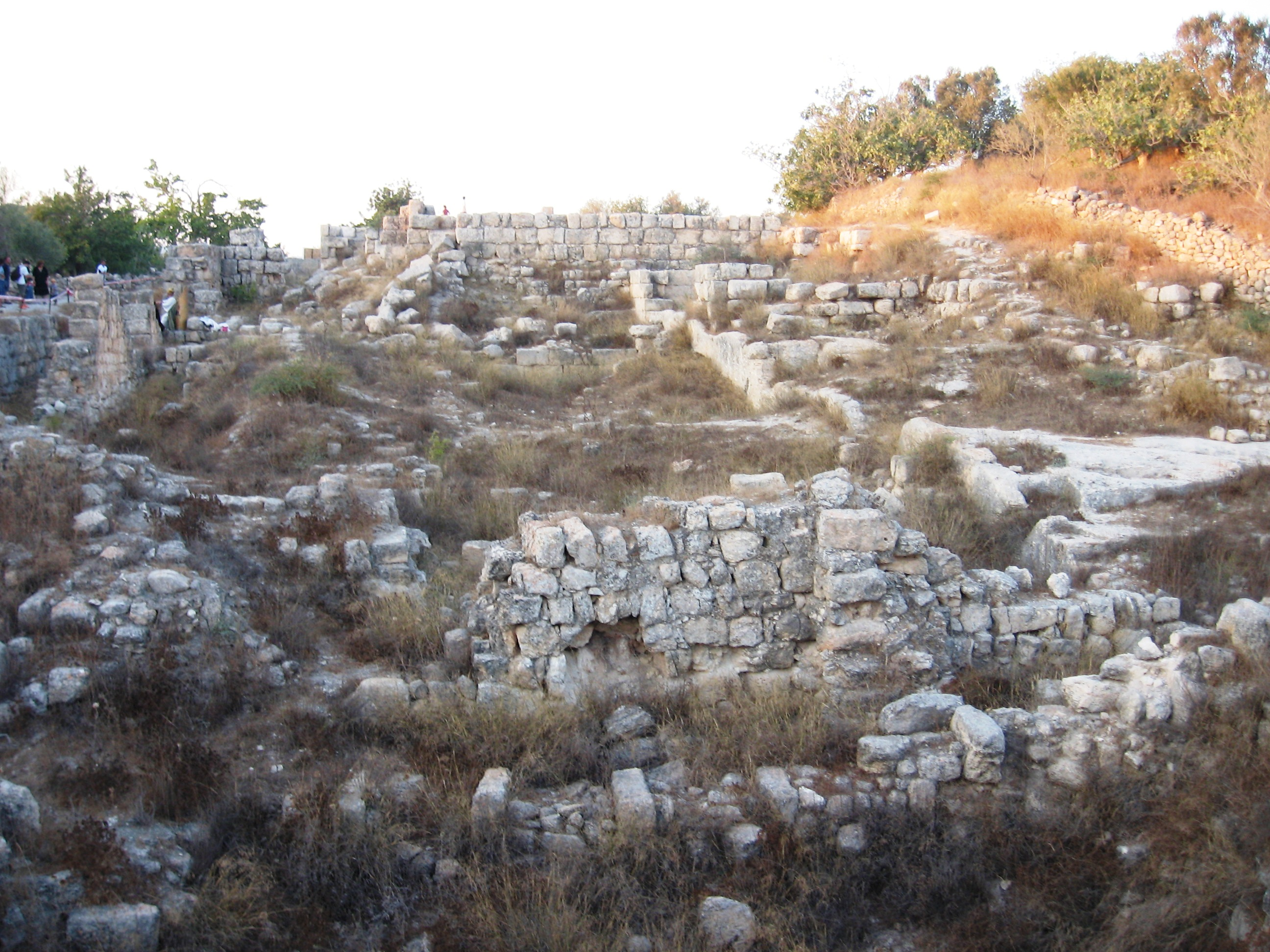
Remains of the palace of the House of Omri, prior to the Assyrian conquest

The Neo-Assyrian province of Samerina was established in the 720s by Shalmaneser V following his conquest of Samaria, also known as the Kingdom of Israel or northern kingdom, which culminated in the capture of its capital city, which was also known as Samaria.

The siege of the city of Samaria has been tentatively dated to 725 or 724 BC, and its resolution in 722 BC, near the end of Shalmaneser's reign. The conquest of Samaria was the signature event of Shalmaneser V's reign, and is recorded in both the Babylonian Chronicles and in 2 Kings of the Hebrew Bible. The siege of Samaria was perceived by contemporaries as the most important event of Shalmaneser's time, as is the only event mentioned in the chronicles in association with his reign. It was possibly also highlighted in part due to its considerable remoteness from Assyria.

The first documented mention of the province of Samerina is from the reign of Shalmaneser V's successor Sargon II, who was credited with naming the province. This is also the first documented instance where a name derived from "Samaria", the capital city, was used for the entire region, although it is thought likely that this practice was already in place.

The Neo-Assyrian Empire under Shalmaneser V and the deportation of peoples from Samerina by Sargon II (and possibly Shalmaneser V)

Following the Assyrian conquest, Sargon II claimed in Assyrian records to have deported 27,280 people to various places throughout the empire, mainly to Guzana in the Assyrian heartland, as well as to the cities of the Medes in the eastern part of the empire (modern-day Iran). The Medes were only conquered by Assyria in 716 BC, six years after the fall of Samaria, suggesting that the relocation took years to plan before it was implemented.

The deportations were part of a standard resettlement policy of the Neo-Assyrian Empire to deal with defeated enemy peoples. The resettled people were generally treated well as valued members of the empire and transported together with their families and belongings. At the same time, people from other parts of the empire were resettled in the depopulated Samerina.

The resettlement is also called the Assyrian captivity in Jewish history and provides the basis for the narrative of the Ten Lost Tribes.

With the Medo-Babylonian conquest of the Assyrian Empire, the end of the Assyrian monarchy with the 609 Fall of Harran, and the rise of the Neo-Babylonian Empire, Samerina passed from Assyrian to Babylonian control.

Archaeological surveys and excavations confirm that in the Iron Age III period (c. 723-538) many settlement sites in the region of Samaria, particularly in the northern part of region, ceased to be inhabited. In southern Samaria, several Assyrian military posts were established and existing settlements were largely resettled by deportees from Mesopotamia whom the Assyrians exiled from Babylon, Cuthath (see also Cuthites), Hamath, and Sepharvaim.

== Conflicting narratives ==
In several Babylonian inscriptions, Sargon II claims to have been the one who conquered Samaria, and various explanations have been proposed for this contradiction.

A prominent explanation is that Sargon's inscriptions relating to Samaria may be referencing another incident in which Sargon was forced to put down a large revolt in Syria that also involved the population of Samaria.

This revolt took place shortly after Sargon's failure to retake Babylonia from Marduk-apla-iddina in 720, and was led by Yahu-Bihdi, the Assyrian governor of Hamath who also rallied support from the cities of Arpad, Damascus, Sumur and Samaria. The claim of conquest therefore might be related to the city of Samaria being captured a second time during this revolt. In addition to these revolts, Sargon may have had to deal with unfinished conflicts from Shalmaneser's reign.

If the explanation of referral to two conquests is accepted however, then it becomes unclear which king was responsible for most of the resettlements, though it is clear from surviving inscriptions that Sargon took responsibility for it.

It has also been suggested that Sargon might have finished the initial siege of Samaria, which had been slow, inefficient and still ongoing at the time of Shalmaneser's death.

== See also ==
- History of ancient Israel and Judah
- Yehud (Babylonian province)
