= 2 Kings 3 =

2 Kings, chapter 3

- ← chapter 2 chapter 4 →
- The pages containing the Books of Kings (1 & 2 Kings) Leningrad Codex (1008 CE).
- Book: Second Book of Kings
- Hebrew Bible part: Nevi'im
- Order in the Hebrew part: 4
- Category: Former Prophets
- Christian Bible part: Old Testament
- Order in the Christian part: 12

2 Kings 3 is the third chapter in the second part of the Books of Kings in the Hebrew Bible or the Second Book of Kings in the Old Testament of the Christian Bible. The book is a compilation of various annals recording the acts of the kings of Israel and Judah by a Deuteronomic compiler in the seventh century BCE, with a supplement added in the sixth century BCE. After a short introduction to the reign of the last king of Israel from the Omride, Jehoram of Israel, the son of Ahab, this chapter records the war of the coalition of the kings of Israel, Judah, and Edom, against Mesha the king of Moab with some contribution of Elisha the prophet. Another view of the events in this chapter is notably provided by the inscription on the Mesha Stele made by the aforementioned king of Moab in c. 840 BCE.

== Text ==
This chapter was originally written in the Hebrew language and since the 16th century is divided into 27 verses.

=== Textual witnesses ===
Some early manuscripts containing the text of this chapter in Hebrew are of the Masoretic Text tradition, which includes the Codex Cairensis (895), Aleppo Codex (10th century), and Codex Leningradensis (1008).

There is also a translation into Koine Greek known as the Septuagint, made in the last few centuries BCE. Extant ancient manuscripts of the Septuagint version include Codex Vaticanus (B; $\mathfrak{G}$^{B}; 4th century) and Codex Alexandrinus (A; $\mathfrak{G}$^{A}; 5th century). (Note: The whole book of 2 Kings is missing from the extant Codex Sinaiticus.)

== Analysis ==
2 Kings 3 has rather coherent syntax with virtually no indications of redactional work on a syntactic level. However, from topographical considerations, the narrative could have at least two layers: the original tradition preserved in verses 4–6 and 24–27 describing the punitive war of Israel against Moab from the north some time after the rebellion of Mesha, which is in accord with the extrabiblical evidence and the settlement history of Trans-Jordan in the ninth century BCE; and another story in verses 7–23 augmenting this basic layer, introducing the formation of an alliance between Israel, Judah, and Edom; the oracle of Elisha; and an attack on Moab from the south. Despite some inconsistencies, the pro-Judean redactor skillfully joined this expansion of the story into a coherent information. The narrative of 2 Kings 3 has thematic and lexical parallels to other passages in the Bible, such as 1 Kings 22 or Numbers 20.

== King Jehoram of Israel (verses 1–3) ==
Jehoram is the last ruler of the Omri dynasty and as the other monarchs in the dynasty he received a negative rating before God, although more favourable than his parents Ahab and Jezebel because 'he is said to have abolished the "pillar of Baal", a cult-stone setup by his father' (although it is not mentioned in 1 Kings 16:32). Nonetheless, he is later killed by Jehu (2 Kings 9:24) and his family dynasty is completely annihilated as prophesied.

=== Verse 1 ===
Now Jehoram the son of Ahab began to reign over Israel in Samaria the eighteenth year of Jehoshaphat king of Judah, and reigned twelve years.

- "The eighteenth year of Jehoshaphat": According to Thiele's chronology, following "non-accession year method", Jehoram the son of Ahab became the king of Israel between April and September 852 BCE after the death of his older brother Ahaziah, because Ahaziah didn't have any sons (2 Kings 1:17). 2 Kings 1:17 synchronizes this year to the second year Jehoram the son of Jehoshaphat as "co-regent" with his father on the throne of Judah. (Note: The 18th year of Jehoshaphat's sole reign is the same as the 20th year of his reign from the beginning of his co-regency with his father, Asa, which is later counted into his total reign of 25 years.)
- "Reigned twelve years": Jehoram of Israel reigned in Israel from between April and September 852 BCE until his death between April and September 841 BCE.

=== Verse 2 ===
And he did evil in the sight of the Lord, but not like his father and mother; for he put away the sacred pillar of Baal that his father had made.

- "In the sight of the Lord": lit. "in the eyes of the Lord".

== War against Moab (verses 4–27) ==
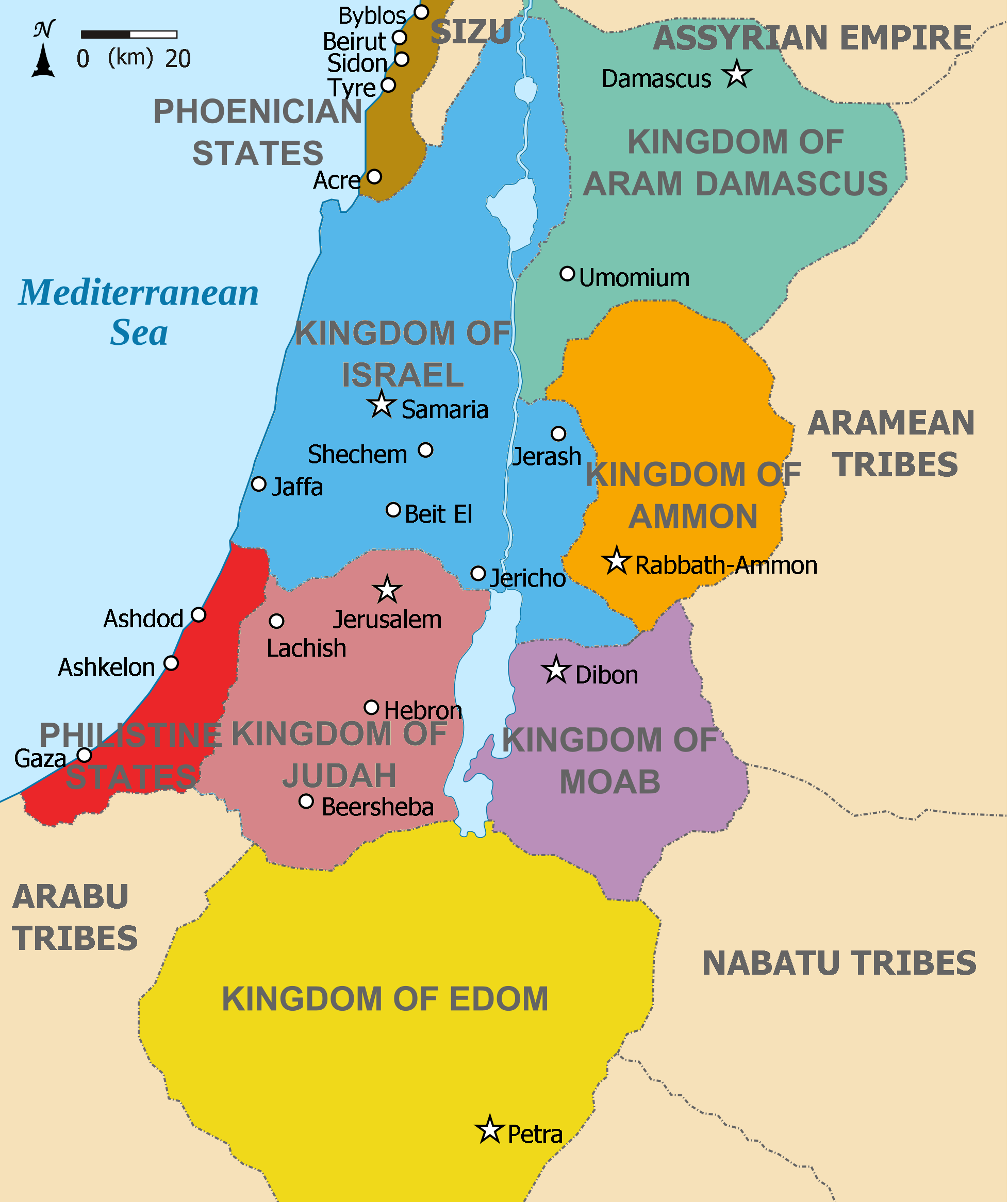
Map showing Kingdoms of the Levant c. 830 BCE. The kingdoms relevant to this chapter are: Israel (blue), Judah (maroon), Moab (purple), and Edom (yellow).

At one point Israel under the Omri dynasty is recognized as a 'regional superpower' that 'the kingdoms of Judah and Edom were compliant' (verses 7–8), 'the kingdom of Moab was a vassal liable to pay tribute' (verse 4), and any rebellions face military reprisals. However, the success of Israel's wars were not without the interference of YHWH, as shown in this section. When the coalition of the kings of Israel, Judah, and Edom against Moab threatens to fail as water supplies ran out in the desert of Edom, Jehoshaphat, the king of Judah, asked to call for a prophet of YHWH. Elisha, an Israelite prophet, showed up but wished only to deal with the king of Judah (verses 11–14) The prophet ensured the success of the campaign with the miraculous help of YHWH. The advance of the allied army against Moab managed to destroy the entire region (verses 24b–26) until the king of Moab, out of desperation, made a terrible sacrifice of his firstborn son to his god, that caused Israel be struck with 'great wrath' and forced the attacking armies to retreat (verse 27).

=== Verse 4 ===
And Mesha king of Moab was a sheepmaster, and rendered unto the king of Israel an hundred thousand lambs, and an hundred thousand rams, with the wool.

- "Mesha king of Moab": this man erected a victory stele, now called "Mesha Stele (Moabite Stone)" which was discovered in the Moabite town of Diban (ancient Dibon) in 1868. The inscription contains statements of his triumphs against Israel (text in ANET, analysis and interpretation in Dearman 1989) with descriptions in some points similar to 2 Kings 3.

=== Verse 5 ===
But it came to pass, when Ahab was dead, that the king of Moab rebelled against the king of Israel.

- Cross reference: 2 Kings 1:1

This and the following verses elaborate the statement in the opening verse of 2 Kings, about Moab's rebellion. Just as the unified kingdom of Israel divides in the days of Solomon's son, the resulted kingdom of Israel divides (with the loss of Moab) in the days of Ahab's son, indicating the framing of Ahab as a perverse Solomon (comparing 2 Kings 3:5 to 1 Kings 12:19).

=== Verse 9 ===
So the king of Israel went with the king of Judah and the king of Edom. And when they had made a circuitous march of seven days, there was no water for the army or for the animals that followed them.

- "The king of Edom": 1 Kings 22:47 states that "there was then no king in Edom: a deputy was king" at the time of Jehoshaphat until Jehoram of Judah. Cogan and Tadmor explain that "it would not, however, be unusual for the same official to be referred to as a 'deputy' in a chronistic source (so 1 Kings 22:48) and a 'king' in a prophetic narrative." Moreover, 2 Kings 8:20 ("In [Jehoram of Judah's] days, Edom revolted from the authority of Judah and set up a king of their own") does not state that there had been no king in Edom up to that time; it could simply mean that they replaced the puppet king/deputy approved by Judah with one of their own liking. The inferior status of this king of Edom is underscored in 2 Kings 3 by the fact that he has neither dialogue, actions, nor even a name.

=== Verse 11 ===
This is the only verse in the chapter that mentions Elijah. It mentions a king looking for prophet Elisha who washed the head of Elijah.

=== Verse 16 ===
And he said, "Thus says the Lord: 'Make this valley full of ditches.'"

The words are an instruction in the New King James Version, but some other versions lack this wording. "Ditches" (KJV/NKJV) can be translated as "water canals", "trenches"(NASB), "pools of water" (New International Version) or "cisterns" (ESV), from Hebrew: גבים גבים gê-ḇîm gê-ḇîm, based on the plural of the Hebrew noun גֵּב, geb or gev ("pit, trench, ditch"), repeated twice for emphasis. The noun means "cistern" in Jeremiah 14:3 (cf. Jeremiah 39:10). These trenches are intended to capture the sēl, which is 'a flash flood resulting from rain falling unseen in the Moabite hills'. The preparation of ditches has been seen in homiletics as a metaphor for preparation.

== Relation to the Mesha Stele ==
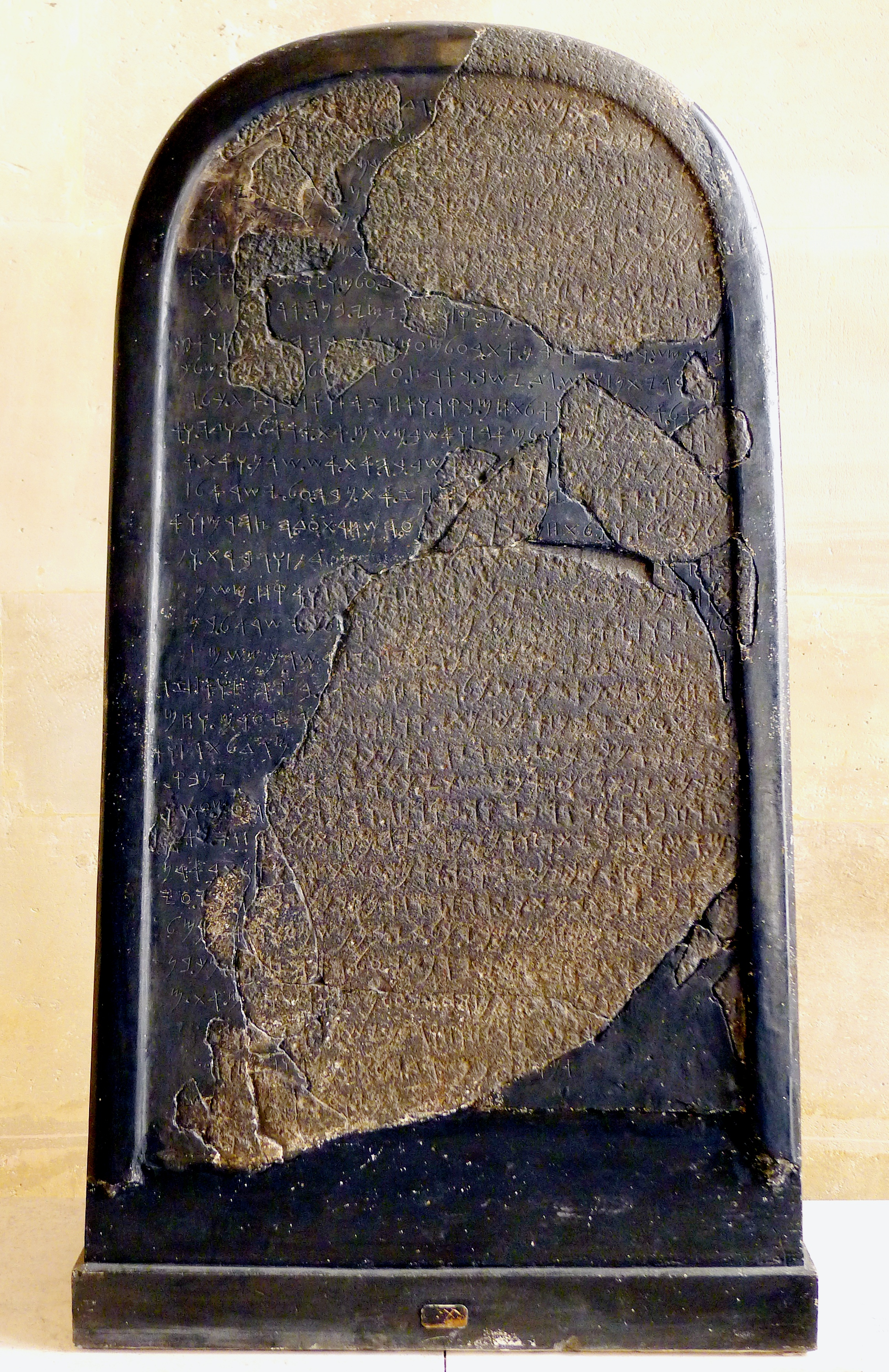
The Mesha Stele in its current location at the Louvre, Paris, France.

The inscription on the Mesha Stele (Mesha Inscription or "MI") verifies certain things recorded in 2 Kings 3 and makes other things in the biblical text more understandable:

1. There was a "Mesha king of Moab" (MI line 1: "I am Mesha, son of Chemosh-yat, king of Moab, the Dibonite"; 2 Kings 3:4).
2. Mesha had been subject to Israel under the Omrides (MI line 6 refers to the son of Omri who said, "I will oppress Moab"; 2 Kings 3:5 (also 2 Kings 1:1) states that Mesha rebelled after the death of Ahab [Omri's son]) and eventually gained his independence from the Omrides.
3. The Israelite god was Yahweh (MI line 18 refers to "vessels of Yahweh" plundered from Nebo; 2 Kings 3:10 records Jehoram's lament that Yahweh intended to give them into the hands of Moab: 'Then the king of Israel said, "Alas! The Lord has called these three kings to give them into the hand of Moab."').
4. Mesha was responsible for flocks (MI line 31: "I led [my shepherds] up there [in order to tend the] sheep of the land"; 2 Kings 3:4).
5. Mesha was a man who could take human life as a religious act of devotion to his god (MI lines 11–12, 15–17, "I slew all the inhabitants of the town [Ataroth], a spectacle for Chemosh and Moab. ... I slew all in it [the city Nebo], seven thousand men and women, both natives and aliens, and female slaves; for I had devoted it to Ashtar-Chemosh"; 2 Kings 3:27 records Mesha's offering of his own son as a burnt offering).
6. Mesha affirmed the power of his god to drive away enemy armies (MI line 19: "Chemosh drove [the king of Israel] out before me"; 2 Kings 3:27 records his sacrifice of his son to Chemosh which is followed by the Israelites withdrawing their attack on Mesha).
7. The tribe of Gad (the Gadites) had occupied territory immediately north of the Arnon river long before the 9th century (MI line 10 said the Gadites were there "from of old"; the Bible does not deny that Moab often occupied the territory north of the Arnon opposite Jericho (e.g., Eglon, Judges 3:12-20), territory it labels the "plains of Moab" (Numbers 22:1; Deuteronomy 34:1, 8; Joshua 13:32) even when it was not subject to Moabite rule). In Mesha Stele it is recorded that Mesha maliciously slaughtered and enslaved the Gadites (MI lines 10–12, 25), which is not mentioned in the Bible, but gives better understanding as to why the Israelite army did 'vindictive military tactics such as destroying cities, stopping up wells, marring fields with stones and cutting down fruit trees' (2 Kings 3:24-25).
8. Mesha conducted military campaigns south of the Arnon River (MI lines 31-33 describe in a somewhat broken text a campaign against Horonaim, although the earlier part emphasizes about the north; 2 Kings 3 records Mesha's campaign to the direction of Edom), though it is difficult to determine when it was in relation to the invasion in 2 Kings 3. In addition to the famous Moabite Stone, there is also a second, less famous and very broken inscription discovered in 1958 at el Kerak (often identified with biblical Kir Hareseth) which seems to dedicate a sanctuary of Chemosh at el Kerak, thus proving that Mesha occupied territory well south of the Arnon as the Bible suggests.
9. The willingness of the king of Edom to participate in the campaign with Israel and Judah against Moab is more understandable in light of Mesha's southern campaign (MI lines 31-33 suggest that one motive for Edomite participation was fear, but more likely from Mesha's development to be independent than to Judah). Moreover, if the foreign population of Horonaim which Mesha displaced (MI in the broken text of line 31) were Edomite and if this occurred before the allies invaded, Edom would have the additional motive of revenge.

On the other hand, the Mesha Inscription spoke about victory over Israel, in contrast to the report of Israel's victory over Moab in 2 Kings 3, but the biblical account of Moab's invasion helps explain why 'Moab is nowhere mentioned in the inscriptions of Shalmaneser III (858-824)', that is, 'Israel's punitive raid had rendered them militarily not worth mentioning'. Therefore, even though detailed synchronization between the Mesha Inscription and 2 Kings 3 can be problematic, Hermann states that "on the whole, the texts complement each other."

== See also ==
- Ahab
- Elisha
- Related Bible parts: 2 Kings 1, 2 Kings 8

== Sources ==
- Collins, John J. (2014). "Chapter 14: 1 Kings 12 – 2 Kings 25". Introduction to the Hebrew Scriptures. Fortress Press. pp. 277–296. ISBN 9781451469233.
- Coogan, Michael David (2007). Coogan, Michael David; Brettler, Marc Zvi; Newsom, Carol Ann; Perkins, Pheme (eds.). The New Oxford Annotated Bible with the Apocryphal/Deuterocanonical Books: New Revised Standard Version, Issue 48 (Augmented 3rd ed.). Oxford University Press. ISBN 9780195288810.
- Dietrich, Walter (2007). "13. 1 and 2 Kings". In Barton, John; Muddiman, John (eds.). The Oxford Bible Commentary (first (paperback) ed.). Oxford University Press. pp. 232–266. ISBN 978-0199277186.
- Gass, Erasmus (2009). "Topographical Considerations and Redaction Criticism in 2 Kings 3". Journal of Biblical Literature. 128 (1). The Society of Biblical Literature: 65–84. doi:10.2307/25610166. JSTOR 25610166.
- Halley, Henry H. (1965). Halley's Bible Handbook: an abbreviated Bible commentary (24th (revised) ed.). Zondervan Publishing House. ISBN 0-310-25720-4.
- Leithart, Peter J. (2006). 1 & 2 Kings. Brazos Theological Commentary on the Bible. Brazos Press. ISBN 978-1587431258.
- McFall, Leslie (1991), "Translation Guide to the Chronological Data in Kings and Chronicles" (PDF), Bibliotheca Sacra, 148: 3–45, archived from the original (PDF) on 2010-08-27
- McKane, William (1993). "Kings, Book of". In Metzger, Bruce M; Coogan, Michael D (eds.). The Oxford Companion to the Bible. Oxford University Press. pp. 409–413. ISBN 978-0195046458.
- Sprinkle, Joe M. (1999). "2 Kings 3: History or Historical Fiction?". Bulletin for Biblical Research. 9. Penn State University Press: 247–270. doi:10.2307/26422244. JSTOR 26422244.
- Stern, Philip D. (1993). "Of Kings and Moabites: History and Theology in 2 Kings 3 and the Mesha Inscription". Hebrew Union College Annual. 64. Hebrew Union College Press: 1–14. JSTOR 23508436.
- Tetley, M. Christine (2005). The Reconstructed Chronology of the Divided Kingdom (illustrated ed.). Eisenbrauns. ISBN 978-1575060729.
- Würthwein, Ernst (1995). The Text of the Old Testament. Translated by Rhodes, Erroll F. Grand Rapids, MI: Wm. B. Eerdmans. ISBN 0-8028-0788-7.
