= Ein as-Sultan =

Ein as-Sultan ('Sultan's spring') may refer to:

- Ein es-Sultan or Elisha Spring, a natural spring in Jericho, West Bank
- Ein as-Sultan camp, a Palestinian refugee camp, near Elisha Spring
