= Jehoram of Judah =

King of Ancient Judah

Jehoram
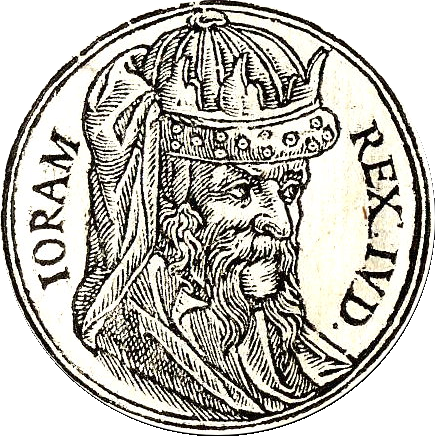
- Jehoram from Guillaume Rouillé's Promptuarii Iconum Insigniorum, 1553

King of Judah
- Reign: c. 853 – 849 BCE (co-regent with Jehoshaphat) c. 849 – 842 BCE (sole reign)
- Predecessor: Jehoshaphat
- Successor: Ahaziah
- Born: c. 882 BCE
- Died: c. 842 BCE (aged 39 or 40)
- Burial: City of David
- Consort: Athaliah of Israel
- Issue: Ahaziah; Jehosheba
- House: House of David
- Father: Jehoshaphat

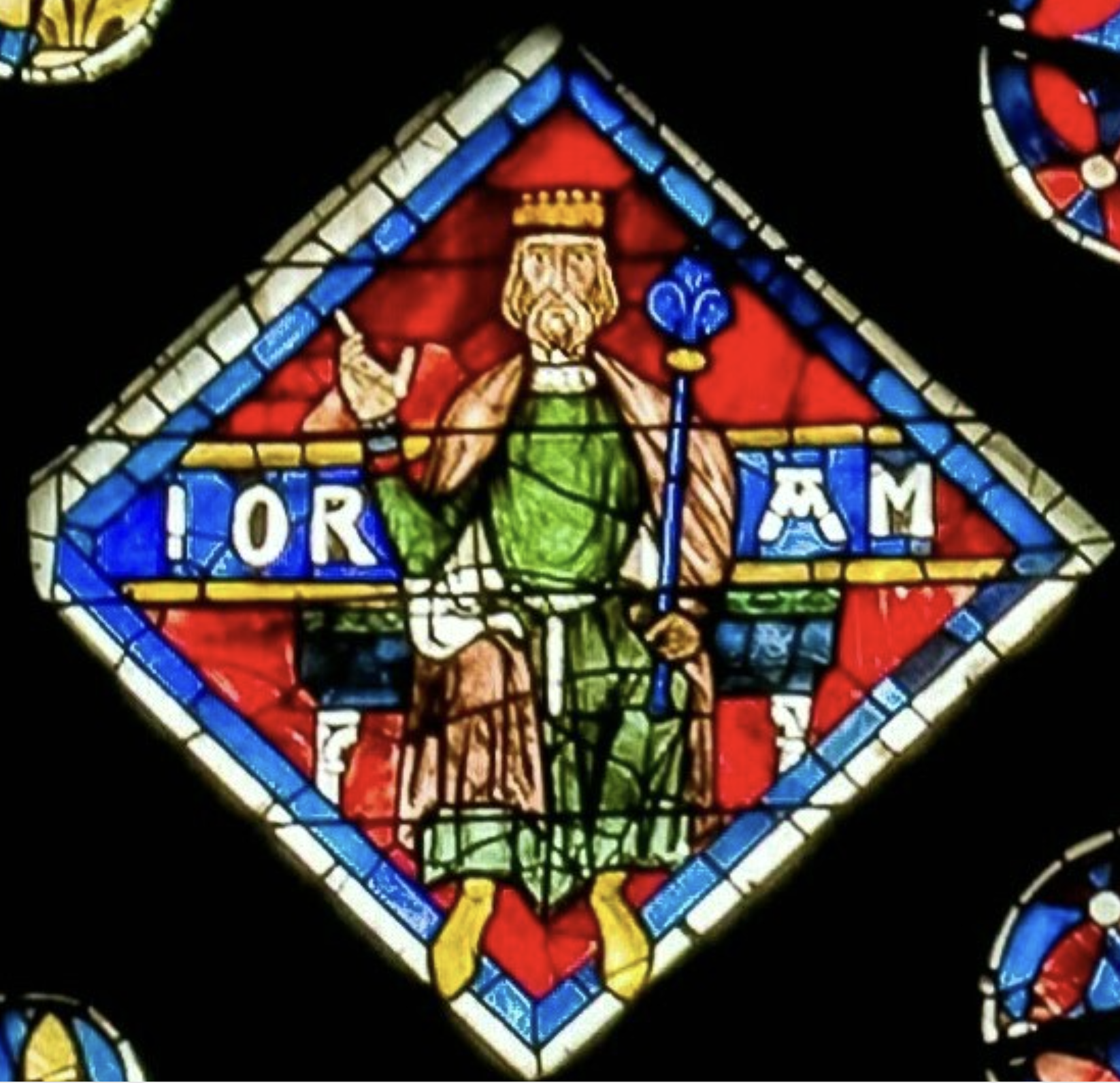
King Jehoram of Judah, from the north rose window of Chartres Cathedral

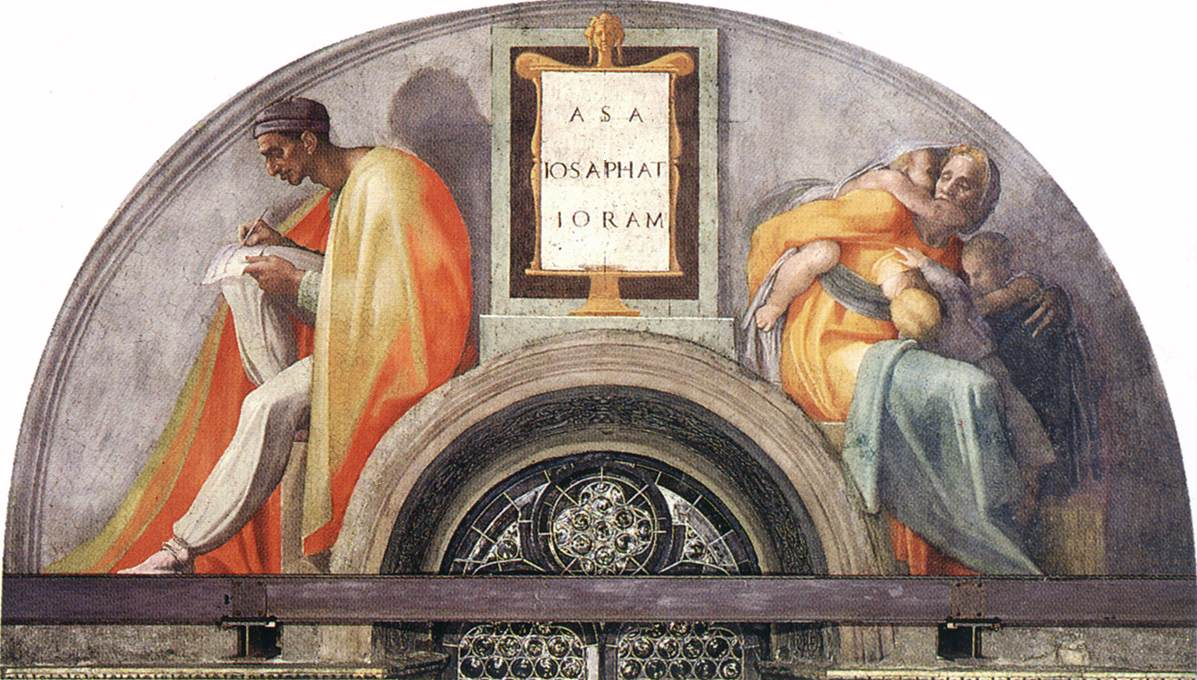
Asa, Jehoshaphat, and Jehoram, from the Sistine Chapel ceiling.

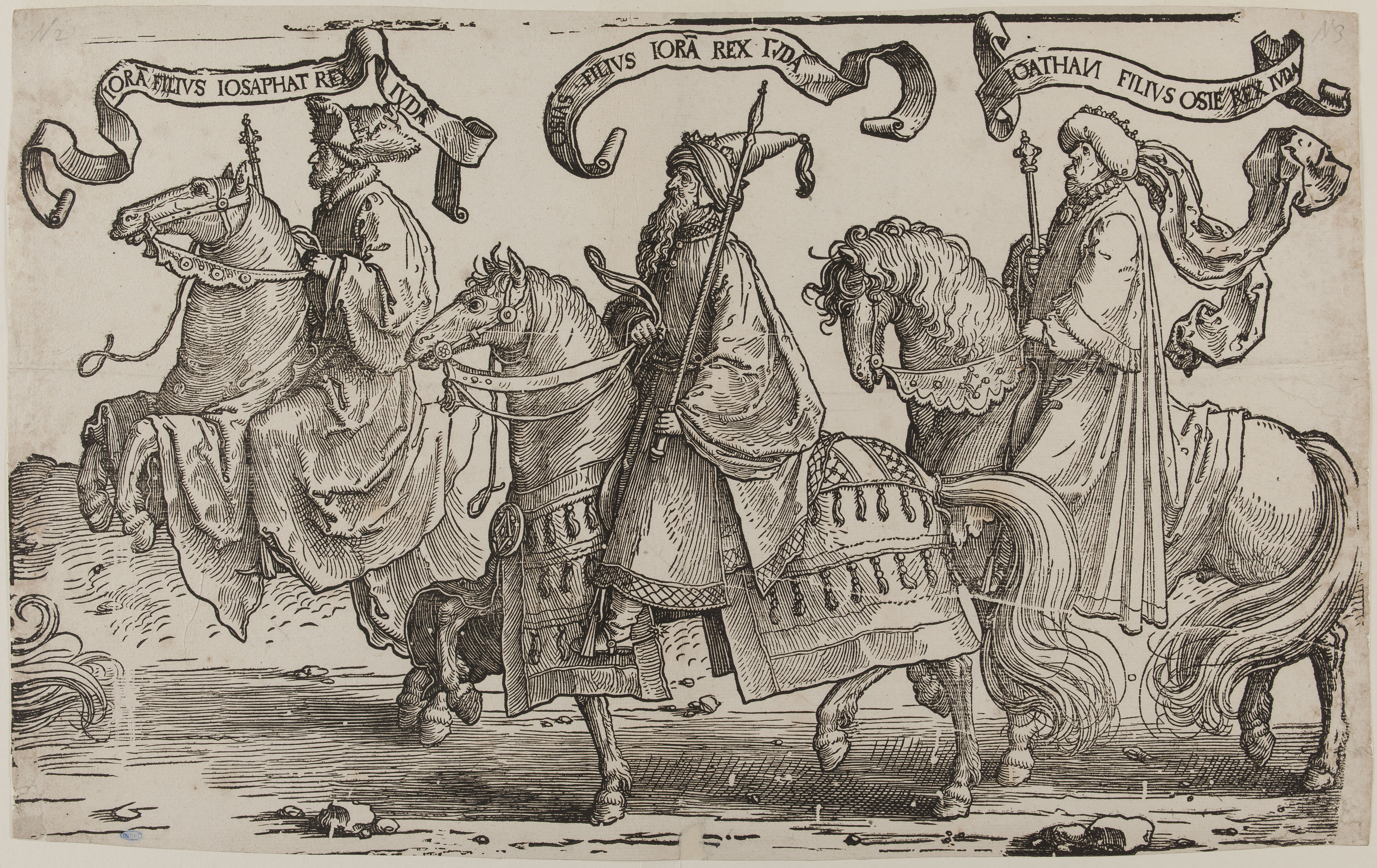
Jehoram, Uzziah, and Jotham, by Lucas van Leyden

Jehoram of Judah (Hebrew: יְהֹורָם, romanized: Yəhōrām, transl. "Yahweh is exalted") or Joram (Hebrew: יוֹרָם, romanized: Yōrām; Greek: Ἰωράμ, romanized: Ioram; Latin: Joram or Ioram), was the fifth king of Judah, and the son of king Jehoshaphat. Jehoram rose to the throne at the age of 32 and reigned for 8 years (2 Kings 8:17, 2 Chronicles 21:20), although he was ill during his last two years (2 Chronicles 21:18–19).

== Name ==
The name Jehoram is confusing in the biblical account. The author of Kings speaks of both Jehoram of Israel and Jehoram of Judah in the same passage, and both reigned at the same time. Both Jehorams are also referred to as Joram, even in the same translation. For example, 2 Chronicles 22:5–6 reads:

5 He walked also after their counsel, and went with Jehoram the son of Ahab king of Israel to war against Hazael king of Aram at Ramoth-gilead; and the Arameans wounded Joram.
6 And he returned to be healed in Jezreel of the wounds which they had given him at Ramah, when he fought against Hazael king of Aram. And Ahaziah the son of Jehoram king of Judah went down to see Jehoram the son of Ahab in Jezreel, because he was sick.

Likewise, the king of Judah is referred to as Jehoram or Joram in a single translation. For example, 2 Kings 8:20–21 uses the name Joram while 2 Chronicles 21:8–9, which describe the same event in almost identical words, uses the name Jehoram. This episode is described in the Tel Dan stele, likely erected by Hazael.

== Reign ==
According to 2 Kings 8:16, Jehoram became king of Judah in the fifth year of Jehoram of Israel, when his father Jehoshaphat was (still) king of Judah, indicating a coregency. Jehoram took the throne at the age of 32 and reigned for 8 years. To secure his position Jehoram killed his six brothers, who were named as Azariah, Jehiel, Zechariah, Azaryahu, Michael, and Shephatiah in 2 Chronicles 21:2.

His father, Jehoshaphat, had allied with the Kingdom of Israel, and one of the terms of this alliance was that Jehoram married Athaliah, the daughter of Ahab. Despite this alliance with the stronger northern kingdom, Jehoram's rule of Judah was shaky. Edom, then ruled by a viceroy of the king of Judah, revolted, and when Jehoram marched against this people, his army fled before the Edomites. He was forced to acknowledge their independence. The town of Libnah revolted during his reign according to 2 Chronicles 21:10 because he "had abandoned Yahweh, God of his fathers".

Jehoram took to wife Athaliah, his namesake's sister and daughter of Ahab and Jezebel, "and he walked in the way of the kings of Israel, as did the house of Ahab" (II Kings viii. 18, 27). His wickedness would have brought his people to destruction, except for the promise to David "to give him always a light, and to his children" (ib. viii. 19; comp. I Kings xi. 36, xv. 4). The Edomites, who had been subservient to Judah since David's day (II Sam. viii. 14), revolted. Jehoram's attempt to force them to submit almost resulted in a fatal disaster for his troops. His army was surrounded but, under cover of night, succeeded in cutting its way out and retreating to its territory. About the same time, Libnah revolted, and the Philistines and Arabians invaded the land of Judah, captured and sacked Jerusalem, and carried off all the royal household except Jehoahaz (Ahaziah; II Chron. xxi. 16, 17). During this time, he received a letter from the prophet Elijah, warning him God would put a plague on the land and smite him for his poor ruling (2 Chronicles 21:12–15). After this, God smote Jehoram with an illness that made "his bowels fall out," and he died two years later (2 Chronicles 21:18–19). Jehoram's idolatry, viciousness, and general wickedness brought upon him an incurable disease. At the end of two years of intense suffering he died, unmourned, and despised by his people. They "made no burning for him, like the burning of his fathers," and "they buried him in the city of David, but not in the sepulchres of the kings" (ib. xxi. 19). Modern scholars debate whether this illness was a form of colorectal cancer, or some other issue resulting in rectal prolapse.

== Chronological notes ==
William F. Albright has dated his reign to 849–842 BCE. Edwin Thiele placed a coregency of Jehoram with his father Jehoshaphat, starting in 853/852 BCE, with the beginning of his sole reign occurring in 848/847 and his death in 841/840 BCE. As explained in the Rehoboam article, Thiele's chronology for the first kings of Judah contained an internal inconsistency that later scholars corrected by dating these kings one year earlier, so that Jehoram's dates are taken as one year earlier in the present article: coregency beginning in 854/853, sole reign commencing in 849/848, and death in 842/841 BCE.

The calendars for reckoning the years of kings in Judah and Israel were offset by six months, that of Judah starting in Tishri (in the fall) and that of Israel in Nisan (in the spring). Cross-synchronizations between the two kingdoms therefore often allow narrowing of the beginning or ending dates of a king to within a six-month range. For Jehoram, the Scriptural data allow the narrowing of the first year of his sole reign to some time between Nisan 1 of 848 BCE and the day before Tishri 1 of the same BCE year. For calculation purposes, this should be taken as the Judean year beginning in Tishri of 849/848 BCE, or more simply 849 BC. His death occurred at some time between Nisan 1 and the day before Tishri 1 of 841 BCE, i.e. in 842/841 BCE according to the Judean calendar. For calculation purposes this can be written in the simpler form 842 BCE, even though Jehoram's death occurred in the next BCE year. This potential confusion is because of expressing dates in a January-based (Roman) calendar; a better notation would be something like 842t, the "t" standing for Tishri, indicating that the year crossed over into the two years 842 and 841 of the modern calendar.

Dates in the present article are one year earlier than those given in the third edition of Thiele's The Mysterious Numbers of the Hebrew Kings, thereby correcting an internal consistency that Thiele never resolved, as explained in the Rehoboam article. According to McFall's revision of Thiele's chronology, the phrase "second year of Jehoram son of Jehoshaphat, king of Judah" in 2 Kings 1:17 is the period of "co-regency" on the throne of Judah with his father Jehoshaphat, who was then in his 18th year of sole reign as noted in 2 Kings 3:1. (Note: The 18th year of Jehoshaphat's sole reign is the same as the 20th year of his reign from the beginning of his co-regency with his father, Asa, which is later counted into his total reign of 25 years.) In Thiele-McFall's calculation, this time point falls between April and September 852 BCE. In 2 Kings 8:16, the phrase "fifth year of Joram the son of Ahab" (following "non-accession year method" fell between April and September 848 BCE) Jehoram became the sole king of Judah after being "co-regent" with his father (as the text indicated: "Jehoshaphat being then king of Judah") since September (Tishrei) 854 BCE.

Thiele showed that for the reign of Jehoram, Judah adopted Israel's non-accession method of counting the years of reign, meaning that the first partial year of the king's reign was counted as his first full year, in contrast to the "accession" method previously in use whereby the first partial year was counted as year "zero", and "year one" was assigned to the first full year of reign. Thiele attributed this change to the rapprochement between Judah and Israel, whereby Jehoshaphat, Jehoram's father, made common cause with Ahab at the battle of Ramoth-Gilead, and chose a daughter for his son from the house of Ahab (1 Kings 22:1–38, 2 Kings 8:18). This convention was followed in Judah for the next three monarchs: Ahaziah, Athaliah, and Jehoash, returning to Judah's original accession reckoning in the time of Amaziah. These changes can be inferred from a careful comparison of the textual data in the Scripture, but because the Scriptural texts do not state explicitly whether the reckoning was by accession or non-accession counting, nor do they indicate explicitly when a change was made in the method, many have criticized Thiele's chronology as being entirely arbitrary in its assignment of accession and non-accession reckoning. The arbitrariness, however, apparently rested with the ancient kings and their court recorders, not with Thiele. The official records of Tiglath-Pileser III show that he switched (arbitrarily) to non-accession reckoning for his reign, in contrast with the accession method used for previous kings of Assyria. Tiglath-Pileser left no record explaining to modern historians which kind of method he was using, nor that he was switching from the method used by his predecessors; all of this is determined by a careful comparison of the relevant texts by Assyriologists, the same as Thiele did for the regnal data of Judah and Israel.

Jehoram of Judah House of David Cadet branch of the Tribe of Judah; Contemporary Kings of Israel: Ahab, Ahaziah, Jehoram
Regnal titles
Preceded by Jehoshaphat	King of Judah; Coregent with Jehoshaphat: 854–849 BCE; Sole reign: 849–842 BCE	Succeeded by Ahaziah

== In Christianity ==
In the Gospel of Matthew, Jehoram appears in the genealogy of Jesus.

== See also ==
- List of biblical figures identified in extra-biblical sources

== Sources ==
- McFall, Leslie (1991), "Translation Guide to the Chronological Data in Kings and Chronicles" (PDF), Bibliotheca Sacra, 148: 3–45, archived from the original (PDF) on 2010-08-27
- Tetley, M. Christine (2005). The Reconstructed Chronology of the Divided Kingdom (illustrated ed.). Eisenbrauns. ISBN 978-1575060729.
- Thiele, Edwin R. (1983). The Mysterious Numbers of the Hebrew Kings (3rd ed.). Grand Rapids, Michigan: Zondervan. ISBN 978-0-310-36010-0.
