= Matthew 12:17–18 =

Matthew 12:17-18
- ← 12:16 12:19 →
- Book: Gospel of Matthew
- Christian Bible part: New Testament

Matthew 12:17-18 are two verses in the twelfth chapter of the Gospel of Matthew in the New Testament.

== Content ==
In the original Greek according to Westcott-Hort, these verses are:

17:ὅπως πληρωθῇ τὸ ῥηθὲν διὰ Ἠσαΐου τοῦ προφήτου, λέγοντος,
18:Ἰδού, ὁ παῖς μου ὃν ᾑρέτισα· ὁ ἀγαπητός μου εἰς ὃν εὐδόκησεν ἡ ψυχή μου· θήσω τὸ πνεῦμά μου ἐπ᾿ αὐτόν, καὶ κρίσιν τοῖς ἔθνεσιν ἀπαγγελεῖ.

In the King James Version of the Bible the text reads:

17:That it might be fulfilled which was spoken by Esaias the prophet, saying,
18:Behold my servant, whom I have chosen; my beloved, in whom my soul is well pleased: I will put my spirit upon him, and he shall shew judgment to the Gentiles.

The New International Version translates the passage as:

17:This was to fulfill what was spoken through the prophet Isaiah:
18:"Here is my servant whom I have chosen, the one I love, in whom I delight; I will put my Spirit on him, and he will proclaim justice to the nations.

== Analysis ==
According to Lapide, the words "my spirit" imply that Christ will possess the gifts of the Holy Ghost from His conception. While the words, "the judgment," which will be proclaimed, is done in Christ, since, "as a lawgiver, shall preach the Evangelical law, not only to the Jews, like Moses but, by the Apostles, to all nations whatsoever."

== Commentary from the Church Fathers ==
Chrysostom: " And that you may not be troubled at those things which are done, and at the incredible madness of the Pharisees, He introduces the Prophet’s words. For such was the carefulness of the Prophets, that they had not omitted even this, but had noted all His ways and movements, and the meaning with which He did this; that you might learn that He spoke all things by the Holy Spirit, for if it be impossible to know the thoughts of men, much more to know the meaning of Christ, unless the Holy Spirit revealed it. Therefore it follows, That it might be fulfilled which was spoken by Esaias the Prophet, saying, Behold my servant whom I have chosen."

Saint Remigius: " The Lord Jesus Christ is called the servant of the Almighty God, not in respect of His divinity, but in respect of the dispensation of the flesh which He took upon Him, because by the cooperation of the Holy Spirit He took flesh of the Virgin without stain of sin. Some books have, Elect, whom I have chosen, for He was chosen by God the Father, that is, predestinated that He should be the Son of God, proper, not adopted."

Rabanus Maurus: " Whom I have chosen, he says, for a work which none else has done, that He should redeem the human race, and make peace between God and the world. It follows, My beloved, in whom my soul is well pleased, for He alone is the Lamb without spot of sin, of whom the Father speaks, This is my beloved Son, in whom I am well pleased. (Mat. 17:5)"

Saint Remigius: " That he says, My soul, is not to be understood as though God the Father had a soul, but by way of adaptation, showing how God is disposed towards Him. And it is no wonder that a soul is ascribed to God in this manner, seeing that all other members of the body are likewise."

Chrysostom: " This the Prophet puts in the beginning, that you might learn that that which is here said was according to the counsel of the Father. For he that is beloved does according to his will who loveth him. And again, he that is chosen, does not as an enemy break the law, nor as one being an adversary of the legislator, but as one in agreement with Him. Because therefore He is beloved, I will put my Spirit upon him."

Saint Remigius: " Then also God the Father put His Spirit upon Him, when by the working of the Holy Spirit He took flesh of the Virgin; and as soon as He became man, He took the fulness of the Holy Spirit."

Jerome: " But the Holy Spirit is put, not on the Word of God, but on the Only-Begotten, who came forth from the bosom of the Father; on Him, that is, of whom it is said, Behold my servant. And what He will do by Him He adds, And he shall declare judgment to the Gentiles."

Augustine: " Seeing He preached the judgment to come which was hidden from the Gentiles."

Preceded by Matthew 12:16	Gospel of Matthew; Chapter 12	Succeeded by Matthew 12:19
