= Matthew 12:19 =

- ← 12:18 12:20 →
- Book: Gospel of Matthew
- Christian Bible part: New Testament

Matthew 12:19 is the nineteenth verse in the twelfth chapter of the Gospel of Matthew in the New Testament.

== Content ==
In the original Greek according to Westcott-Hort, this verse is:

Οὐκ ἐρίσει, οὐδὲ κραυγάσει· οὐδὲ ἀκούσει τις ἐν ταῖς πλατείαις τὴν φωνὴν αὐτοῦ.

In the King James Version of the Bible the text reads:

He shall not strive, nor cry; neither shall any man hear his voice in the streets.

The New International Version translates the passage as:

He will not quarrel or cry out; no one will hear his voice in the streets.

== Analysis ==
This verse seems to point to the humble nature of Jesus, in contrast to his adversaries who proudly make a lot of noise about their criticism of Him.

== Commentary from the Church Fathers ==
Chrysostom: " Further, to show His lowliness, He says, He shall not strive; and so He was offered up as the Father had willed, and gave Himself willingly into the hands of His persecutors. Neither shall he cry; so He was dumb as a lamb before his shearer. Nor shall any hear voice in the streets."

Jerome: " For the way is broad and wide which leads to destruction, and many walk in it; and being many, they will not hear the voice of the Saviour, because they are not in the narrow but in the broad way."

Saint Remigius: " The Greek πλατεῖα, is in Latin called ‘latitudo’. No one therefore has heard His voice in the streets, because He has not promised pleasant things in this world to those that love Him, but hardships."

Preceded by Matthew 12:18	Gospel of Matthew; Chapter 12	Succeeded by Matthew 12:20
