= Matthew 12:21 =

- ← 12:20 12:22 →
- Book: Gospel of Matthew
- Christian Bible part: New Testament

Matthew 12:21 is the 21st verse in the twelfth chapter of the Gospel of Matthew in the New Testament.

== Content ==
In the original Greek according to Westcott-Hort, this verse is:

Καὶ ἐν τῷ ὀνόματι αὐτοῦ ἔθνη ἐλπιοῦσι.

In the King James Version of the Bible the text reads:

And in his name shall the Gentiles trust.

The New International Version translates the passage as:

In his name the nations will put their hope.

== Analysis ==
The Hebrew for Isaiah 42:1 has islands rather than nations for this text, the meaning being that even remote nations on islands will place their hope in Christ.

== Commentary from the Church Fathers ==
Chrysostom: "But the things of this dispensation will not rest in this only, that they who have not believed should be punished, but He will also draw the world to Him; whence it follows, And in his name shall the Gentiles hope."

Augustine: "This last we now see fulfilled; and thus this which cannot be denied establishes the truth of that which some have denied through ignorance, the last judgment namely, which He will hold upon earth, when he Himself shall come from heaven. For who could have expected that the Gentiles would have hope in Christ’s name, when He was in the hands of His enemies, when He was bound, scourged, set at nought, and crucified; when even His disciples had lost that hope which they had begun to have in Him? That which one thief hardly hoped on the cross, the nations scattered far and wide now hope. And that they may not die for ever, they are marked with that very cross on which he died. Let none then doubt that the last judgment will be by Christ Himself."

Saint Remigius: "And it should be known, that the meaning not only of this passage, but of many others also, is supported by this testimony from the Prophet. The words, Behold my servant, may be referred to the place in which the Father had said above, This is my Son. (Mat. 3:17.) The words, I will put my Spirit upon him, is referred to the descent of the Holy Spirit upon the Lord at His baptism; He shall declare judgment to the Gentiles, to that which He says below, When the Son of Man shall sit in the seat of his Majesty. (Mat. 25:31) What he adds, He shall not strive nor cry, refers to the Lord how He answered but little to the Chief Priests, and to Pilate, but to Herod nothing at all. He shall not break the bruised reed, refers to His shunning His persecutors that they might not be made worse; and that In his name shall the Gentiles hope, refers to what Himself says below, Go ye, and teach all nations. (Mat. 28:19)"

| Preceded by Matthew 12:20 | Gospel of Matthew; Chapter 12 | Succeeded by Matthew 12:22 |
