= Matthew 12:22 =

- ← 12:21 12:23 →
- Book: Gospel of Matthew
- Christian Bible part: New Testament

Matthew 12:22 is the 22nd verse in the twelfth chapter of the Gospel of Matthew in the New Testament.

== Content ==
In the original Greek according to Westcott-Hort, this verse is:

Τότε προσηνέχθη αὐτῷ δαιμονιζόμενος, τυφλὸς καὶ κωφός· καὶ ἐθεράπευσεν αὐτόν, ὥστε τὸν τυφλὸν καὶ κωφὸν καὶ λαλεῖν καὶ βλέπειν.

In the King James Version of the Bible the text reads:

Then was brought unto him one possessed with a devil, blind, and dumb: and he healed him, insomuch that the blind and dumb both spake and saw.

The New International Version translates the passage as:

Then they brought him a demon-possessed man who was blind and mute, and Jesus healed him, so that he could both talk and see.

== Analysis ==
This verse also appears in Luke 11:14, although in that account the demon-possessed man was only dumb. Luke may have omitted his blindness or he may be recounting a different miracle. It appears that the demon was making the man both blind and mute. Allegorically when the devil has been driven out, one sees the light of faith, and then praises God.

== Commentary from the Church Fathers ==
Glossa Ordinaria: " The Lord had refuted the Pharisees above, when they brought false charges against the miracles of Christ, as if He had broken the sabbath in doing them. But inasmuch as with a yet greater wickedness they perversely attributed the miracles of Christ done by divine power to an unclean spirit, therefore the Evangelist places first the miracle from which they had taken occasion to blaspheme, saying, Then was brought to him one that had a dæmon, blind and dumb."

Saint Remigius: " The word Then refers to that above, where having healed the man who had the withered hand, He went out of the synagogue. Or it may be taken of a more extended time; Then, namely, when these things were being done or said."

Chrysostom: " We may wonder at the wickedness of the dæmon; he had obstructed both inlets by which he could believe, namely, hearing and sight. But Christ opened both, whence it follows, And he healed him., insomuch that the blind and dumb both spake and saw."

Jerome: " Three miracles were wrought in one and the same person at the same time; the blind sees, the dumb speaks, the possessed is delivered from the dæmon. This was at that time done in the flesh, but is now daily being fulfilled in the conversion of them that believe; the dæmon is cast out when they first behold the light of the faith, and then their mouths which had before been stopped are opened to utter the praises of God."

Hilary of Poitiers: " Not without reason, after having mentioned that all the multitude was healed together, does he bring in the cure of this man separately who was dæmoniac, blind and dumb. For after the man of the withered hand had been brought before Him, and been healed in the Synagogue, it behoved that the salvation of the Gentiles should be represented in the person of some other afflicted man; he who had been the habitation of a dæmon, and blind and dumb, should be made meet to receive God, should contain God in Christ, and by confession of God should give praise to the works of Christ."

Augustine: " For he that believes not, is truly dæmoniac, blind, and dumb; and he that has not understanding of the faith, nor confesses, nor gives praise to God, is subject to the devil."

Augustine: " This narrative is given by Luke, not in this place, but after many other things intervening, and speaks of him as dumb only, and not blind. But he is not to be thought to be speaking of another man, because he is silent respecting this one particular; for in what follows he agrees exactly with Matthew."

Preceded by Matthew 12:21	Gospel of Matthew; Chapter 12	Succeeded by Matthew 12:23
