= Matthew 12:20 =

- ← 12:19 12:21 →
- Book: Gospel of Matthew
- Christian Bible part: New Testament

Matthew 12:20 is the 20th verse in the twelfth chapter of the Gospel of Matthew in the New Testament.

== Content ==
In the original Greek according to Westcott-Hort, this verse is:

Κάλαμον συντετριμμένον οὐ κατεάξει, καὶ λίνον τυφόμενον οὐ σβέσει· ἕως ἂν ἐκβάλῃ εἰς νῖκος τὴν κρίσιν.

In the King James Version of the Bible the text reads:

A bruised reed shall he not break, and smoking flax shall he not quench, till he send forth judgment unto victory.

The New International Version translates the passage as:

A bruised reed he will not break, and a smoldering wick he will not snuff out, till he leads justice to victory.

== Analysis ==
The generally agreed on meaning for this proverb is that Christ will not contentiously rebuke and persecute those that are weak in faith, or love, but rather will strengthen and kindle them using His own meekness and gentleness.

== Commentary from the Church Fathers ==
Chrysostom: "The Lord sought to heal the Jews by this mildness. But though they rejected Him, yet He did not resist them by destroying them; whence the Prophet, displaying His power and their weakness, says, A bruised reed he shall not break, and a smoking flax he shall not quench."

Jerome: "He that holds not out his hand to a sinner, nor bears his brother’s burden, he breaks a bruised reed; and he who despises a weak spark of faith in a little one, he quenches a smoking flax."

Augustine: " (ubi sup) So He neither bruised nor quenched the Jewish persecutors, who are here likened to a bruised reed which has lost its wholeness, and to a smoking flax which has lost its flame; but He spared them because He was not come to judge them, but to be judged by them."

Augustine: "In the smoking flax it is observed, that when the flame is out it causes a stink."

Chrysostom: " Or this, He shall not break a bruised reed, shows that it was as easy for Him to break them all, as to break a reed, and that a bruised reed. And, He shall not quench a smoking flax, shows that their rage was fired, and that the power of Christ was strong to quench such rage with all readiness; hence in this is shown the great mercy of Christ."

Hilary of Poitiers: " Or, he means this bruised reed that is not broken, to show that the perishing and bruised bodies of the Gentiles, are not to be broken, but are rather reserved for salvation. He shall not quench a smoking flax, shows the feebleness of that spark which though not quenched, only moulders in the flax, and that among the remnants of that ancient grace, the Spirit is yet not quite taken away from Israel, but power still remains to them of resuming the whole flame thereof in a day of penitence."

Jerome: "Or, the reverse, He calls the Jews a bruised reed, whom tossed by the wind and shaken from one another, the Lord did not immediately condemn, but patiently endured; and the smoking flax He calls the people gathered out of the Gentiles, who, having extinguished the light of the natural law, were involved in the wandering mazes of thick darkness of smoke, bitter and hurtful to the eyes; this He not only did not extinguish, by reducing them to ashes, but on the contrary from a small spark and one almost dead He raised a mighty flame."

Chrysostom: " But one might say, What then, shall these things be always thus? Will He endure for ever those who thus lay snares, and are mad against Him? Far from it; when His own work shall be all complete, then shall He work these things also. And. this He signifies, saying, Until he shall send forth judgment to victory; as much as to say, When He shall have accomplished all things which are of Himself, then shall He bring in perfect vengeance; then shall they receive punishment when He has made his victory illustrious, that there be not left to them any irreverent opportunity of contradiction,"

Hilary of Poitiers: " Or, Until he shall send forth judgment to victory, that is, Until He shall take away the power of death, and bring in judgment and the return of His splendour."

Rabanus Maurus: " Or, Until that judgment which was being done in Him should come forth to victory. For after that by His resurrection He had overcome death, and driven forth the prince of this world, He returned as conqueror to His kingdom to sit on the right hand of the Father, until He shall put all His enemies under His feet."

Preceded by Matthew 12:19	Gospel of Matthew; Chapter 12	Succeeded by Matthew 12:21
