= Matthew 12:14–16 =

Matthew 12:14-16
- ← 12:13 12:17 →
- Book: Gospel of Matthew
- Christian Bible part: New Testament

Matthew 12:14-16 is a set of verses in the twelfth chapter of the Gospel of Matthew in the New Testament.

== Content ==
In the original Greek according to Westcott-Hort, these verses are:

14: Οἱ δὲ Φαρισαῖοι συμβούλιον ἔλαβον κατ᾿ αὐτοῦ ἐξελθόντες, ὅπως αὐτὸν ἀπολέσωσιν.
15: Ὁ δὲ Ἰησοῦς γνοὺς ἀνεχώρησεν ἐκεῖθεν· καὶ ἠκολούθησαν αὐτῷ ὄχλοι πολλοί, καὶ ἐθεράπευσεν αὐτοὺς πάντας,
16: καὶ ἐπετίμησεν αὐτοῖς, ἵνα μὴ φανερὸν αὐτὸν ποιήσωσιν·

In the King James Version of the Bible, the text reads:

14: Then the Pharisees went out, and held a council against him, how they might destroy him.
15: But when Jesus knew it, he withdrew himself from thence: and great multitudes followed him, and he healed them all;
16: And charged them that they should not make him known:

The New International Version translates the passage as:

14: But the Pharisees went out and plotted how they might kill Jesus.
15: Aware of this, Jesus withdrew from that place. Many followed him, and he healed all their sick,
16: warning them not to tell who he was.

== Analysis ==
According to Cornelius Cornelii a Lapide, the word "charged", in verse 16, (Greek: ἐπετίμησε, epetimse) means "rebuked, threatened, or commanded with threats", so that the multitude should not reveal the miracles which Jesus performed, and this was perhaps done so that He might not offend the Scribes, and move them to greater envy and wrath. Also, that He might show how far removed He was from seeking glory from the praise of others.

== Commentary from the Church Fathers ==
Hilary of Poitiers: "The Pharisees are moved with jealousy at what had been done; because beholding the outward body of a man, they did not recognize the God in His works; The Pharisees went out and sought counsel against him, how they might destroy him."

Rabanus Maurus: "He says, went out because their mind was alien from the Lord. They took counsel how they might destroy life, not how themselves might find life."

Hilary of Poitiers: "And He knowing their plots withdrew, that He might be far from the counsels of the evil hearted, as it follows, Jesus knowing it departed thence."

Jerome: "Knowing, that is, their designs against Him withdrew Himself, that He might remove from the Pharisees all opportunity of sin."

Saint Remigius: "Or, He withdrew from thence as avoiding the designs of His own when they persecuted Him; or because that was not the time or place for Him to suffer, for It cannot he that a Prophet should perish out of Jerusalem, (Luke 13:33) as He Himself spake. The Lord also shunned those who persecuted Him through hatred, and went thither where He found many who were attached to Him from affection, whence it follows, And there followed him many. Him whom the Pharisees with one consent plotted against to destroy, the untaught multitude with one consent love and follow; whence they soon received the fulfilment of their desires, for it follows, And he healed them all."

Hilary of Poitiers: "On those whom He healed He enjoined silence, whence it follows, And he charged them that they should not make him known. For his restored health was a witness to each man. And by commanding them to hold their peace, He avoids all ostentation of Himself, and at the same time notwithstanding affords a knowledge of Himself in that very admonition to hold their peace; for the observance of silence proceeds from that very thing which is to be kept silent."

Rabanus Maurus: "In this also He instructs us, that when we have done any thing great we are not to seek praise abroad."

Saint Remigius: "And He also gives them command that they should not make Him known, that they might not by persecuting Him be put into a worse state."

Preceded by Matthew 12:13	Gospel of Matthew; Chapter 12	Succeeded by Matthew 12:17
