= Matthew 12:23 =

- ← 12:22 12:24 →
- Book: Gospel of Matthew
- Christian Bible part: New Testament

Matthew 12:23 is the 23rd verse in the twelfth chapter of the Gospel of Matthew in the New Testament.

== Content ==
In the original Greek according to Westcott-Hort, this verse is:

Καὶ ἐξίσταντο πάντες οἱ ὄχλοι καὶ ἔλεγον, Μήτι οὗτός ἐστιν ὁ υἱὸς Δαβίδ;

In the King James Version of the Bible the text reads:

And all the people were amazed, and said, Is not this the son of David?

The New International Version translates the passage as:

All the people were astonished and said, "Could this be the Son of David?"

== Analysis ==
The crowd is amazed (Greek: ἐξίσταντο, from which the English word ecstasy is derived) at the works of Christ and wonder if He is the promised Messiah, known by the title "the son of David".

== Commentary from the Church Fathers ==
Hilary of Poitiers: "All the multitude were astonished at this which was done, but the jealousy of the Pharisees grew thereupon, And all the multitude were astonished and said, Is not this the Son of David?"

Glossa Ordinaria: " Because of His mercy and His goodness to them they proclaim Him the Son of David."

Preceded by Matthew 12:22	Gospel of Matthew; Chapter 12	Succeeded by Matthew 12:24
