= Matthew 12:24 =

- ← 12:23 12:25 →
- Book: Gospel of Matthew
- Christian Bible part: New Testament

Matthew 12:24 is the 24th verse in the twelfth chapter of the Gospel of Matthew in the New Testament.

== Content ==
In the original Greek according to Westcott-Hort, this verse is:

Οἱ δὲ Φαρισαῖοι ἀκούσαντες εἶπον, Οὗτος οὐκ ἐκβάλλει τὰ δαιμόνια, εἰ μὴ ἐν τῷ Βεελζεβοὺλ ἄρχοντι τῶν δαιμονίων.

In the King James Version of the Bible the text reads:

But when the Pharisees heard it, they said, This fellow doth not cast out devils, but by Beelzebub the prince of the devils.

The New International Version translates the passage as:

But when the Pharisees heard this, they said, "It is only by Beelzebub, the prince of demons, that this fellow drives out demons."

== Analysis ==
The Pharisees were blinded with envy and hatred of Christ, and yet they could not deny the miracles he did, so they slanderously claimed that they were magical, being done by the power of Satan and not God.

== Commentary from the Church Fathers ==
Rabanus Maurus: " The multitude who seemed less learned, always wondered at the works of the Lord; they, on the other hand, either denied these things, or what they could not deny laboured to pervert by an ill interpretation, as though they were wrought not by a Deity, but by an unclean spirit, namely, Beelzebub, who was the God of Acharon: The Pharisees when they heard it said, This man does not cast out dæmons but by Beelzebub, the prince of the dæmons."

Saint Remigius: "Beelzebub is the same as Beel or Baal, or Beelphegor. Beel was father of Ninus king of Assyria; Baal was so called because he was worshipped on high; he was called Beelphegor from the mountain Phegor; Zebub was the servant of Abimelech the son of Gedeon, who, having slain his seventy brothers, built a temple to Baal, and set him up as Priest therein, to drive away the flies which were collected there by the abundant blood of the victims; for Zebub means, a fly. Beelzebub therefore is interpreted, The man of flies, wherefore from this most unclean worship they called him the Prince of the dæmons. Having therefore nothing more mean to cast upon the Lord, they said that He cast out dæmons by Beelzebub. And it should be known that this word is not to be read with d or t at the end, as some corrupt copies have, but with b."

| Preceded by Matthew 12:23 | Gospel of Matthew; Chapter 12 | Succeeded by Matthew 12:25 |
