= Ein es-Sultan =

Natural spring in Jericho

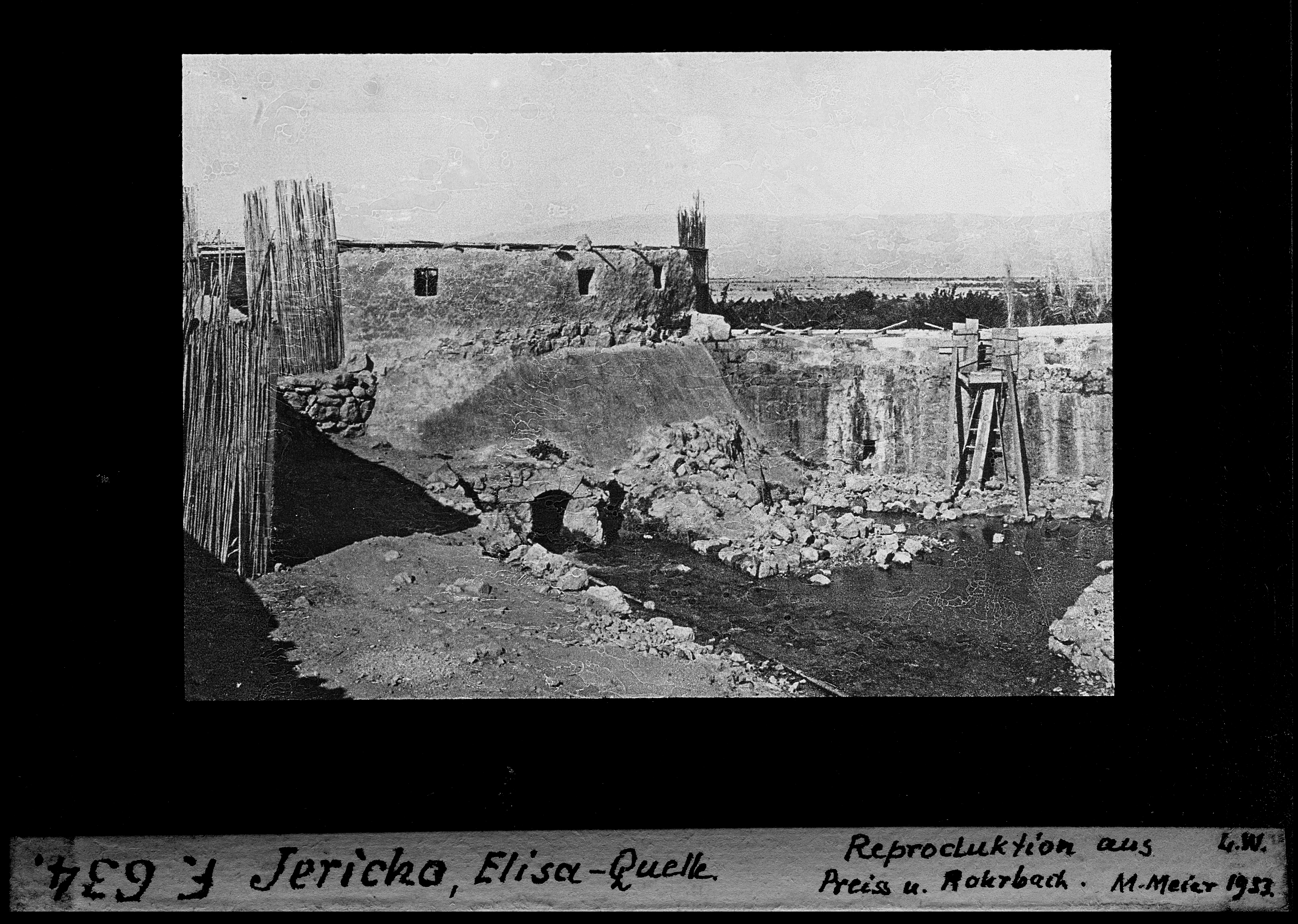
Elisha's Spring, 1920s

Ein es-Sultan is a natural spring in Jericho, at the site of ancient Jericho, which has been identified with the tell (archaeological mound) known as Tell es-Sultan.

It is known by Jews and Christians as the Spring of Elisha/Elisha's Spring, based on a biblical story about Prophet Elisha (see 2 Kings 2: The early acts of Elisha: bringing life and death (2:19-25)). In the Middle Ages, it was also known as Elisha's Fountain.

The Ein as-Sultan camp just north of it is named for the spring.

== Etymology ==
Ein is Arabic for spring, sultan for ruler, king. Alternative spelling variants include 'ein, ain, 'ain, ayn, and 'ayn, and for the definite article el, al, and as.

== History ==
The first permanent settlement built near ancient Jericho was at Tell es-Sultan, by the Ein es-Sultan spring, between 8000 and 7000 BC, and consisted of a number of walls, a religious shrine, and a 23-foot (7.0 m) tower with an internal staircase. After a few centuries, it was abandoned for a second settlement established in 6800 BC close by.

To Jews and Christians, the Ein es-Sultan spring is known as the "Spring of Elisha", after the biblical story about its purification by the prophet Elisha. The Byzantines built a domed church nearby dedicated to Saint Eliseus (Elisha in Greek).

The Crusaders improved the water mills at Ein es-Sultan.

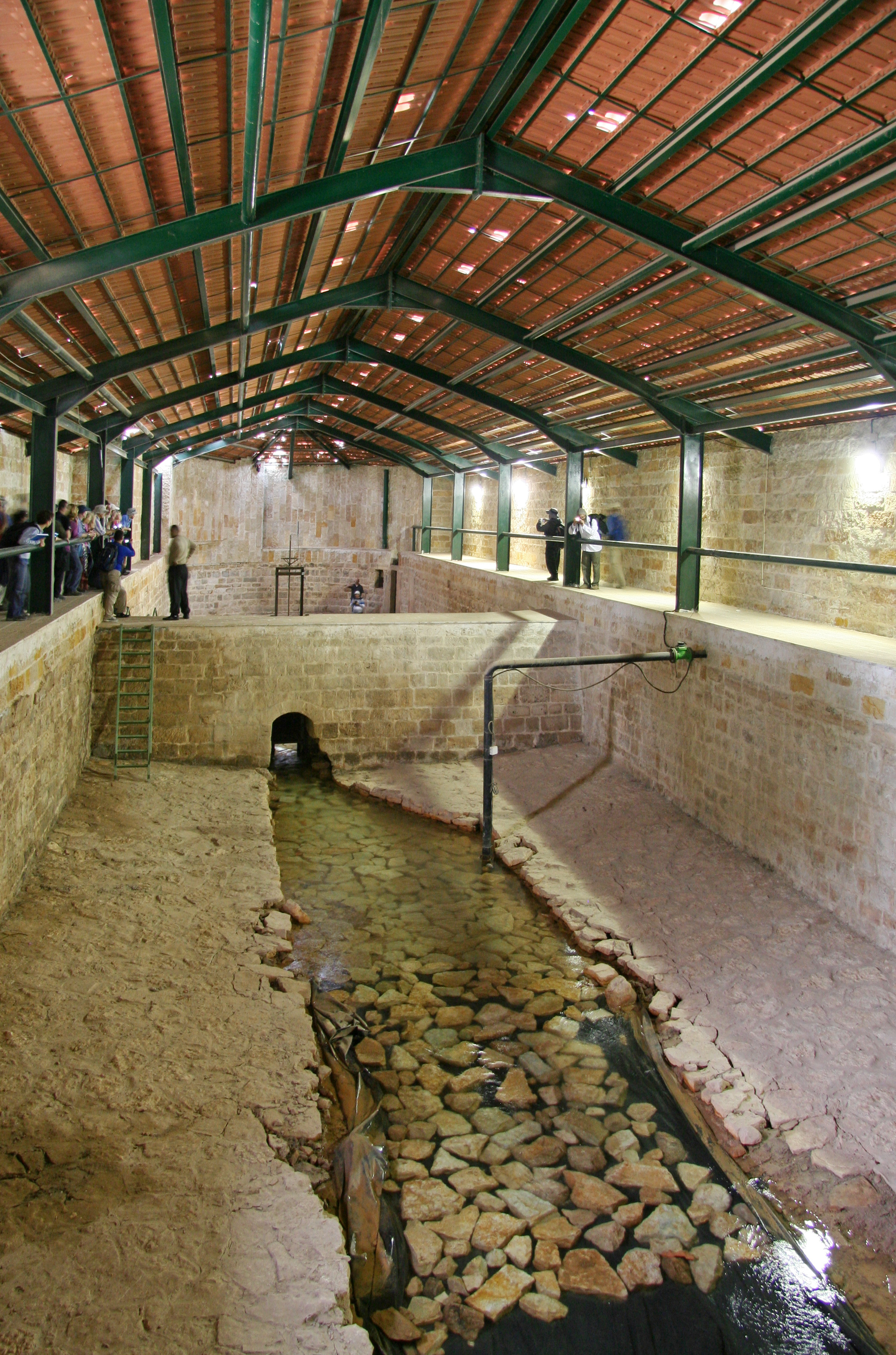
The spring, now inside a protective building

In 2010, the spring saw the end of a year-long rehabilitation programme. By 2000 a protective building which helps avoid contamination of the water had been erected over the spring, and by 2010 the rehabilitation included the old facilities, the preservation of archaeological remains, and landscaping works at the site for tourism purposes. The Government of Italy led and financed the project, with support from the United Nations Development Programme-Programme of Assistance to the Palestinian People (UNDP-PAPP), as part of an upgrading effort of water networks in Jericho and Hebron.
