= Jehoram of Israel =

Biblical King of Israel

Jehoram יְהוֹרָם
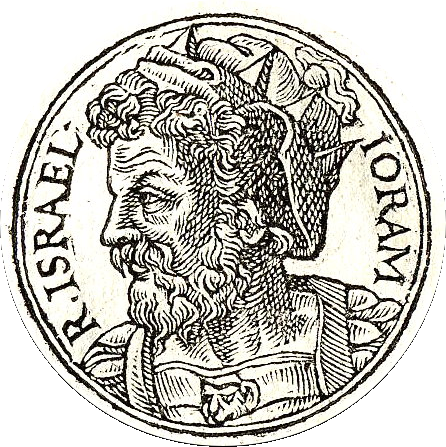
- Jehoram from Guillaume Rouillé's Promptuarii Iconum Insigniorum

King of Israel (Northern Kingdom)
- Reign: c. 852 – c. 841 BCE
- Predecessor: Ahaziah
- Successor: Jehu
- Father: Ahab
- Mother: Jezebel

Jehoram or Joram (Hebrew: יְהוֹרָם, romanized: Yəhorām) was the ninth king of the northern Kingdom of Israel. He was the son of King Ahab and Jezebel and brother to Ahaziah and Athaliah.

According to 2 Kings 8:16, in the fifth year of Jehoram of Israel, a different Jehoram became king of Judah. The author of the Books of Kings speaks of both Jehoram of Israel and Jehoram of Judah in the same passage. They were brothers-in-law since Jehoram of Judah married Athaliah, sister of Jehoram of Israel.

== Biblical narrative ==
Jehoram began his reign in the 18th year of Jehoshaphat of Judah and ruled 12 years according to 2 Kings 3:1. William F. Albright dated his reign to 849–842 BCE, whereas E. R. Thiele proposed 852–841 BCE.

Unlike his predecessors, Jehoram did not worship Ba'al. He removed the "pillar of Baal" according to 2 Kings 3:2, probably a special pillar that Ahab had erected near his palace at the then-capital of Jezreel. However, the writer of 2 Kings says that he still "followed in the ways of Jeroboam, son of Nebat, who led the Israelites to sin." With Jehoshaphat of Judah, Jehoram attacked Moab, which was ruled by Mesha. In the war between Aram-Damascus and Israel, Elisha the prophet befriended Joram, revealing to him the plans of the enemy. Subsequently, when Ben-hadad of Aram-Damascus besieged Samaria, the capital of Israel, it reduced the city almost to starvation and cannibalism. As a result, Jehoram sought to behead Elisha. The latter, however, foretold that a period of plenty was imminent; the siege was soon lifted, the city's food supplies were replenished, and the old relation between the king and the prophet was restored.

When Hazael, king of the Arameans, violently revolted in Damascus, as Elisha had predicted in 2 Kings 8:12, Jehoram allied with his nephew Ahaziah, king of Judah. The two kings set forth to take Ramoth-Gilead from Aram-Damascus. The battle failed; Jehoram was wounded in the fighting and withdrew to Jezreel to recover. His defeat at Ramoth-Gilead was likely a disaster. As a result, while Jehoram was recuperating at Jezreel, his general, Jehu, incited a revolt. Jehu executed Jehoram by shooting him in the back with an arrow and had his body thrown into the field of Naboth as punishment for his parents' sin in illegally stealing Naboth's land. Jehoram and his other family members died, and the Omride dynasty ended. Jehu claimed the throne of Israel as his own.

== Archaeology ==
The author of the Tel Dan Stele (9th century BCE, found in 1993 and 1994) claimed to have slain both Ahaziah of Judah and Jehoram of Israel. Most scholars identify Hazael of Aram-Damascus (c. 842 – 806 BCE) as the author. The coalition that had been forged between Ahab and Hadadezer, who had provided the main force that stopped the Assyrian king Shalmaneser III at the Battle of Qarqar, had fallen apart under their successors and in the succeeding war between Israel and Judah against Aram-Damascus the kings of Israel and Judah were killed. Jehu, an important military leader, became king after this event.

On the Mesha Stele, which is dated to ca. 840 BCE, King Mesha of Moab claimed an important victory against Israel after having been oppressed by Omri and his son (not mentioning anyone specifically) for forty years, retaking several towns and many prisoners of war. The biblical story claims this revolt started during the short rule of Ahaziah of Judah and continued until the reign of Jehoram in 2 Kings 3. The reference to Omri's "son" has been understood by some scholars to refer to a second or third-generation descendant of Omri (either Ahaziah or Jehoram) rather than a direct son.

== See also ==
- List of biblical figures identified in extra-biblical sources

Jehoram of Israel House of Omri; Contemporary Kings of Judah: Jehoshaphat, Jehoram, Ahaziah
Regnal titles
Preceded by Ahaziah	King of Israel; 852–841 BCE	Succeeded by Jehu
