= Ahaziah of Israel =

Biblical King of Israel

Ahaziah אֲחַזְיָה
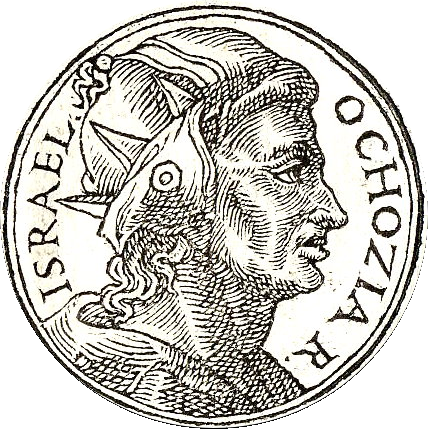
- Ahaziah from Guillaume Rouillé's Promptuarii Iconum Insigniorum, 1553 CE

King of Israel (Northern Kingdom)
- Reign: c. 853 – c. 852 B.C.
- Predecessor: Ahab
- Successor: Jehoram
- Father: Ahab
- Mother: Jezebel

Ahaziah (Hebrew: אֲחַזְיָה, romanized: ʾĂḥazyā, "Yahweh has grasped"; Greek: Ὀχοζίας, Ochozias in the Septuagint and the Douay–Rheims Bible, from Second Temple Hebrew ʾAḫazyā) was the eighth king of the northern Kingdom of Israel and the son of Ahab and Jezebel. Like his father, he reigned from Samaria. William F. Albright has dated his reign to 850–849 BC, while Edwin R. Thiele offers the dates 853–852 BC.

The author of the Books of Kings criticized him for following the ways of his father Ahab and his mother Jezebel, and for making Israel sin "in the way of Jeroboam the son of Nebat". Biblical commentator Albert Barnes notes that the phrase "in the way of his mother" does not occur anywhere else in the Hebrew Bible, and demonstrates the strong feeling of the writer of the Books of Kings as to the influence of Jezebel.

== Reign ==
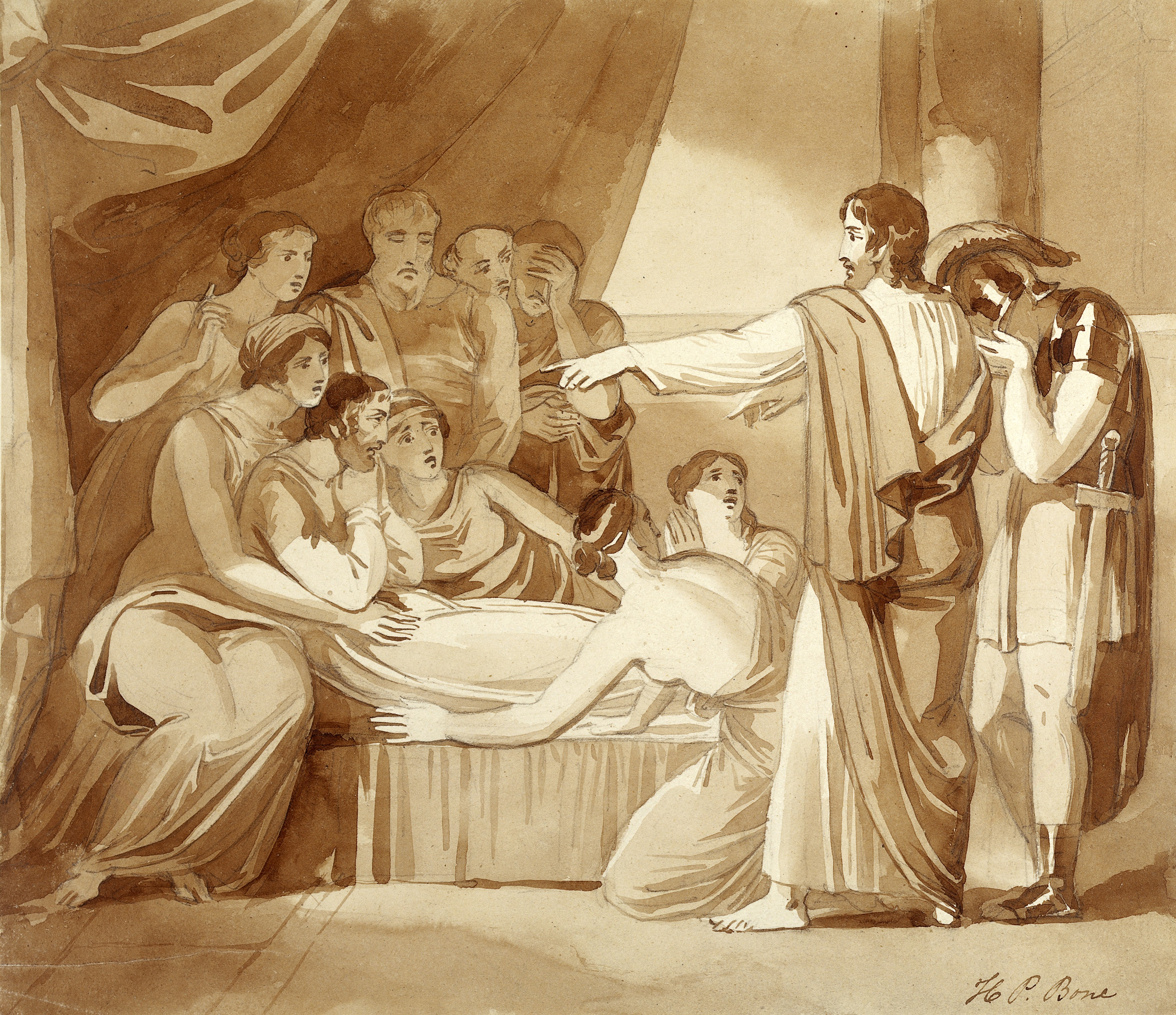
Ahaziah lies on his sickbed after his fall. Elijah enters and prophesises his death (Henry Pierce Bone)

During his reign the Moabites revolted against his authority (2 Kings 3:5–7). This event is recorded on the Mesha Stele, an extensive inscription written in the Moabite language.

Ahaziah formed a business partnership with Jehoshaphat, king of Judah, in order to construct a fleet of trading ships. However, because Jehoshaphat had made an alliance with Ahaziah (who was doing the same evil as Ahab and Jezebel, his father and mother, in the kingdom of Israel) the ships were wrecked and never set sail.

His messengers, sent to consult Baal-Zebub (the god of prophecy in Ekron) regarding his recovery from the effects of a fall from the roof-gallery of his palace, were met on the way by Elijah, who sent them back to tell the king that, for his deeds and for seeking a god that was not the God of Israel, he would never rise from his bed (1 Kings 22:51; 2 Kings 1:18). According to the Second Book of Kings, he did not recover from his injuries and died.

Having no son, Ahaziah was succeeded as king of Israel by Jehoram, his younger brother.

== Sources ==
Ahaziah of Israel House of Omri; Contemporary King of Judah: Jehoshaphat
Regnal titles
Preceded by Ahab	King of Israel; 853–852 BCE	Succeeded by Jehoram
