= Christian Discourses =

1848 book by Søren Kierkegaard

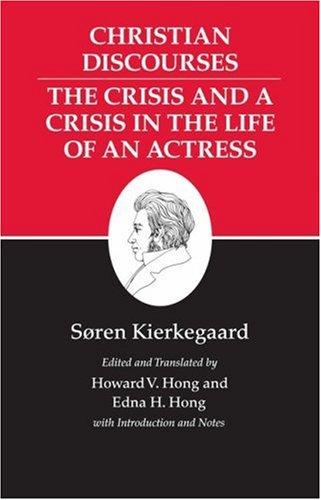
- Author: Søren Kierkegaard
- Original title: Christelige Taler
- Translator: Walter Lowrie (1940); Howard Hong and Edna Hong (1997)
- Language: Danish
- Series: Second volume (Discourses)
- Genre: Christianity, psychology
- Publisher: C.A. Reitzel
- Publication date: April 26, 1848
- Publication place: Denmark
- Media type: paperback
- Pages: 300
- ISBN: 9780691140780
- Preceded by: Works of Love
- Followed by: The Crisis and a Crisis in the Life of an Actress

Christian Discourses (Danish: Christelige Taler) is a book by Søren Kierkegaard which was originally published in Danish in 1848. Kierkegaard asked how a burden can be light if suffering is heavy in his 1847 book, Edifying Discourses in Diverse Spirits, and (paradoxically) that the happiness of eternity outweighs even the heaviest temporal suffering. A year later, he said that 1848 was the richest and most fruitful year he had experienced as an author. Kierkegaard makes similar statements in Christian Discourses, which was published on April 26, 1848; hardship procures hope, the poorer one becomes the richer one makes others, adversity is prosperity. He writes about an eminent pagan killing God and flying high over an abyss, and spiritual communism. Kierkegaard's twenty-eight discourses are divided into four groups of seven, moving the reader from paganism to the suffering Christian. After becoming polemical in the third section, he brings the individual before God in the final section.

== Structure ==
The book consists of four parts, each with seven discourses of ascending levels of religious development. Kierkegaard used the term "discourse" rather than "sermon" because a sermon presupposes authority, and does not deal with doubt. He said repeatedly that the "author does not have authority to preach and by no means claims to be a teacher". They are Christian discourses offered with the right hand, instead of pseudonymous writings offered with the left hand. Kierkegaard used Matthew 6:24-34 as his text for the introduction and part one. Part two deals with how a Christian handles adversity and suffering. Part three is more polemical, and aims to "wound from behind". Part four combines simplicity and earnestness with reflection, presenting crucial Christian concepts. Kierkegaard's goal is to awaken interest in the things of the spirit in his first and second discourses, moving to Christianity in his later discourses.

Part 1: The Cares of the Pagans	Part 2: States of Mind in the Strife of Suffering	Part 3: Thoughts That Wound from Behind	Part 4: Discourses at the Communion on Fridays
The Care of Poverty	The Joy of it: That One Suffers Only Once But Is Victorious Eternally	Watch Your Step When You Go to the House of the Lord	Luke 22:15
The Care of Abundance	The Joy of it: That Hardship Does Not Take Away But Procures Hope	"See, We Have Left Everything and Followed You; What Shall We Have?"	Matthew 11:28
The Care of Lowliness	The Joy of it: That the Poorer You Become the Richer You Are Able to Make Others	All Things Must Serve Us for Good When We Love God	John 10:27
The Care of Loftiness	The Joy of it: That the Weaker You Become the Stronger God Becomes in You	There Will Be the Resurrection of the Dead, of the Righteous and of the Unrighteous	I Corinthians 11:23
The Care of Presumptuousness	The Joy of it: That What You Lose Temporally You Gain Eternally	We are Closer to Salvation Now-Than When We Became Believers	II Timothy 2:12f
The Care of Self-Torment	The Joy of it: That When I "Gain Everything I Lose Nothing at All	But It Is Blessed-to Suffer Mockery for a Good Cause	I John 3:20
The Care of Indecisiveness, Vacillation, and Disconsolateness	The Joy of it: That Adversity is Prosperity	He Was Believed in the World	Luke 24:51

=== Introduction ===
The bird and the lily are compared with the pagan and the Christian in an attempt to show them the "schoolmasters and how we learn from the birds to relinquish all our troubled concerns." These teachers were introduced by Christ in the Sermon on the Mount. The bird and the lily judge and condemn no one, and an individual can learn from them what it means to instruct. Kierkegaard's text is Matthew 6:24-34; he wants to "make clear what is required of the Christian", and asks if a Christian country can return to paganism: "The upbuilding discourse is fighting in many ways for the eternal to be victorious in a person, but in the appropriate place and with the aid of the lily and the bird."

=== Part One: The Cares of the Pagans ===
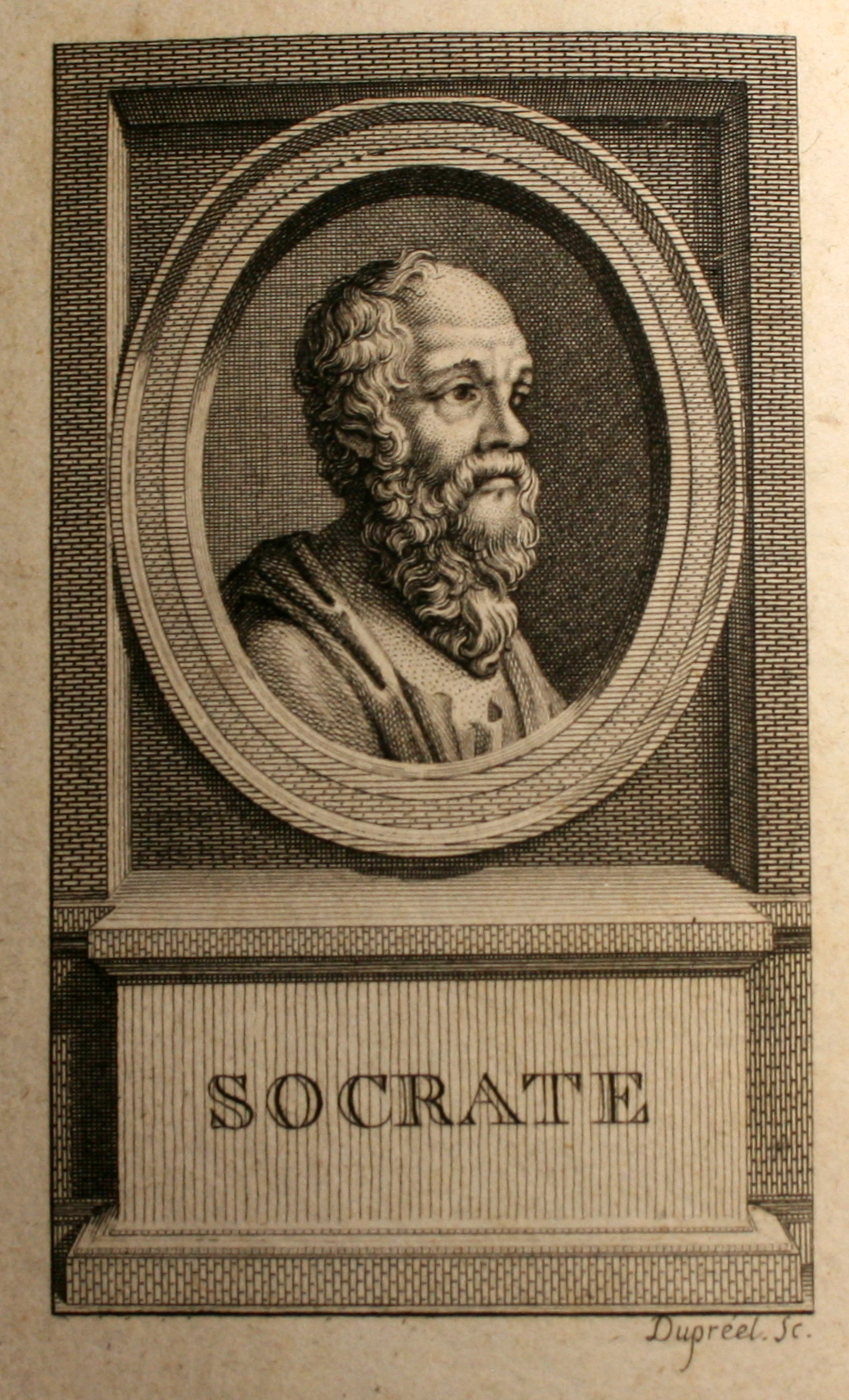
Kierkegaard liked to use Socrates in his writings.

Kierkegaard uses Matthew 6:24-34 as "The Gospel for the Fifteenth Sunday after Trinity", noting the concerns of earthly life (beginning with material needs). He thinks that one should begin with paganism instead of orthodoxy when instructing in Christianity. Kierkegaard discusses "universally human and unavoidable" suffering, comparing the concerns of the lily and the bird with those of the pagan and the Christian. Christ said in his Sermon on the Mount not to worry about food or drink. The first two discourses (the cares of poverty and abundance) deal with this theme. The bird (like the simple wise man of antiquity) seems to be ignorant of these cares, but both pagan and Christian must deal with them in their own way.

Lowliness and loftiness are dealt with next. The lowly Christian exists before God and has Christ (the prototype) as an example, but the lowly pagan is "without God in this world" and desires to become something in the world. The bird knows nothing of loftiness. The Christian (like Socrates) is ignorant of loftiness and is equal before God; the lofty pagan "flies high over the abyss", with the others below him.

Self-importance makes an individual presumptuous and concerned about the future; the fifth and sixth discourses deal with this theme. The lily or the bird knows nothing about eminence; the eminent Christian is "satisfied with God's grace", since all Christians are equal in this regard. The eminent pagan wants to "kill God" and take over the vineyard in an attempt to "add one foot to his growth." The Christian knows that God cannot be killed (only the thought of God), and fights to keep the thought of God alive.

Anxiety about "the next day" is the theme of Kierkegaard's sixth discourse. A bird knows nothing about the next day; a Christian knows that each day has its own troubles, so "the next day does not exist for him." The self-tormentor forgets today in anxious concern for the next day. This section is reminiscent of The Concept of Anxiety:

"What is anxiety? It is the next day. With whom, then, does the pagan contend in anxiety? With himself, with a delusion, because the next day is a powerless nothing if you do not give it your strength. If you give it all your strength, then you find out terribly, as the pagan does, however strong you are – what a prodigious power the next day is! In this way the pagan devours himself, or the next day devours him. Alas, there a human soul went out; he lost his self.

Kierkegaard's seventh discourse deals with choosing whether or not to be a Christian. "No one can serve two masters", and the pagans seek all things. The bird seems to have no will of its own, but the pagan and the Christian have two wills. The pagan is "a mind in rebellion", and wants to "get rid of the thought of God ... The Christian denies himself in such a way that this is identical with obeying God."

=== Part Two: States of Mind in the Strife of Suffering ===
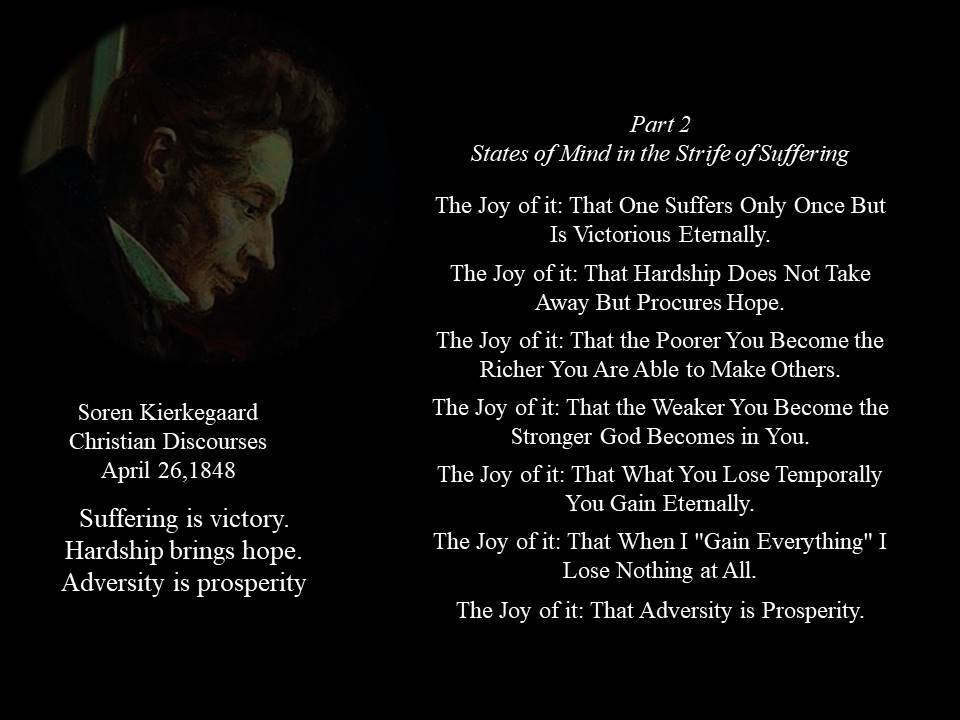
An outline of part 2 of the book

Part 2 deals with hardships and sufferings which, paradoxically, bring joy to the striving Christian. According to Michael Strawser, the book might have been called The Joy of Christian Irony. The Christian must learn to look at everything turned around; adversity is prosperity, suffering is victory, and hardship brings hope. One becomes rich by becoming poor, and strong through weakness.

Kierkegaard says that "the upbuilding discourse is a good in itself", but before the upbuilding comes the "terrifying". Suffering is a transition to eternity; hardship is not to be feared, and is difficult for the lower nature which sleeps. The sleeper must awaken and continue into adulthood.

His second discourse says, "Hope recruits hope." According to Thomas Croxall, this discourse merits more than a passing reference. Striving is a determined effort in anticipation of eternal bliss, which follows a personal decision.

His third discourse deals with material and spiritual goods. Karl Marx published his Communist Manifesto on February 29, 1848, and Kierkegaard his Christian Discourses on April 26 of that year. Marx's book deals with the material world rather than the spiritual one; Kierkegaard's book deals with the world of the spirit. Marx says that the economic world order is the highest; Kierkegaard, concerned with the religious, nudges the individual toward developing spiritual goods. Spiritual goods are easier to share than material goods which are shared grudgingly; they are a communication, and benefit everyone. Spiritual goods make everyone rich; the poorer you become in the external sense, the richer you can make your neighbor through the internal goods of the spirit.

The fourth discourse discusses the paradox of weakness becoming strength. The weaker one becomes, the stronger God becomes in one; "everything depends on how the relationship is viewed." Kierkegaard continues his theme of suffering and self-renunciation in his fifth discourse about the temporal and eternal. What you lose temporally, you gain eternally. The temporal is certain for many, but to the Christian the eternal is certain. It can be lost, however, by being reduced to the temporal.

The sixth discourse discusses gain and loss. Kierkegaard says that the Christian must "die to the world" because much of what is possessed is "the false everything":

You yourself perhaps know that for a moment it looks as if one could in two ways fight this joyful thought through to victory. One could strive to make it entirely clear to oneself that everything one loses, that the false everything is nothing. Or one takes another way; one seeks to compete conviction of a positive spirit that everything one gains is in truth everything. The latter method is the better of the two and thus is the only one. To have the power to understand that the false everything is nothing, one must have the true everything as an aid; otherwise, the false everything takes all the power away from one. With the aid of nothing, it is really not possible to see that the false everything is nothing. Christian Discourses, Hong, p. 145

In the final discourse, Kierkegaard says that adversity is prosperity. The Christian needs to "have an eye for turned-aroundness" and revisit the "distinction between adversity and prosperity". There are two goals: temporality and eternity. The reader began with temporality in Part One, and reaches eternity at the end of Part Two. "As long as you do not believe it, adversity remains adversity. It does not help you that it is eternally certain that adversity is prosperity; as long as you do not believe it, it is not true for you."

=== Part Three: Thoughts that Wound from Behind ===
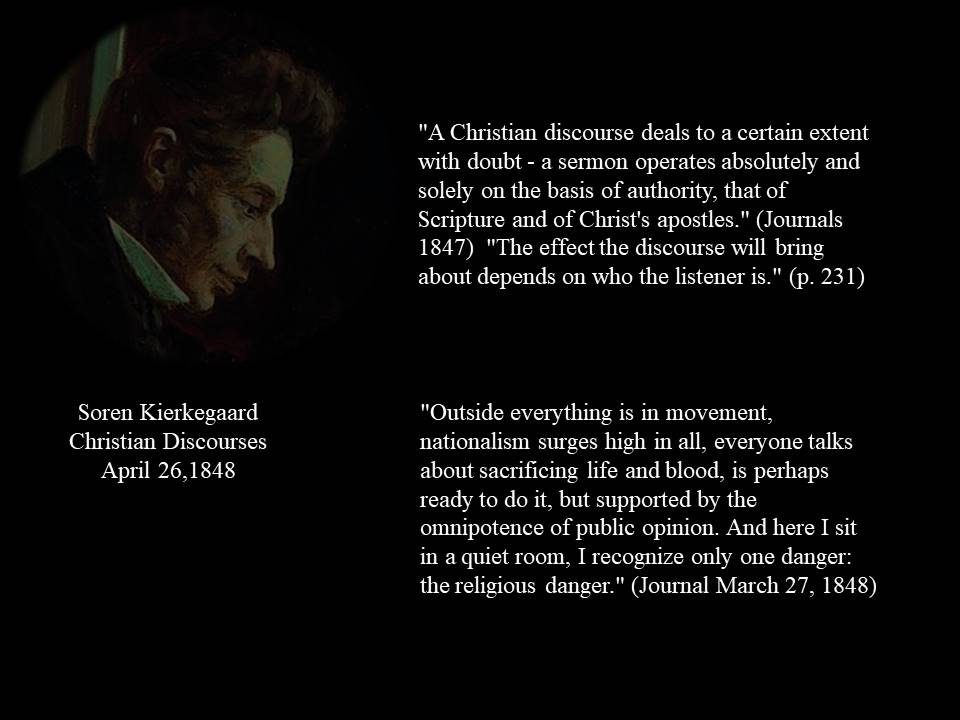
Kierkegaard focuses on the Bible's difficult verses.

Walter Lowrie said that Kierkegaard "ventured to apply this 'higher category' to the third section of the Christian Discourses": the category of authority. Some Biblical verses tend to "wound a person from behind", according to Kierkegaard, including "Blessed are those who suffer persecution for the sake of righteousness, for theirs is the kingdom of heaven. Blessed are you when people insult and persecute you and speak every kind of evil against you for my sake and lie. Rejoice and be glad, for your reward will bed great in heaven; so have they persecuted the prophets who were before you." (Matthew 5:10) Kierkegaard is trying to get the Christian "before God", or a little closer to that goal, in this section:

The essentially Christian needs no defense, is not served by any defense – it is the attacker; to defend it is of all perversions the most indefensible, the moist inverted, and the most dangerous – it is unconsciously cunning treason. Christianity is the attacker – in Christendom, of course, it attacks from behind.

His first discourse is based on Ecclesiastes 5:1: "Watch your step when you go to the house of the Lord." There is security in a church where one can profess one's faith with other believers, but Kierkegaard thinks this security has some danger. God uses the circumstances of one's life to preach awakening. One must be honest before God by allowing one's life to express itself: "Take care, therefore, when you go up to the house of the Lord because there you will get to hear the truth – for upbuilding." The upbuilding is there for each individual in accordance with the reason they came to church.

The second discourse is based on Matthew 19:27: "We have left everything and followed you; what shall we have?" The Old Testament required Abraham to sacrifice Isaac, but Christianity asks the Christian to give up everything and follow Christ voluntarily: "So Peter left the certain and chose the uncertain, chose to be Christ’s disciple, the disciple of him who did not even have a place to lay his head." Kierkegaard stresses that God does not unconditionally require anyone to give up everything.

The third discourse, "All Things Must Serve Us for Good – When We Love God", is based on Romans 8:28. Kierkegaard stresses the "little bad word" "when" in his view of this verse: "Woe to the presumptuous who would dare to love God without needing him!". According to Kierkegaard, we show our love for God when we need him. We should not be concerned about salvation: "Therefore, when! This 'when,' it is the preacher of repentance."

Kierkegaard's fourth discourse, "There Will Be the Resurrection of the Dead, of the Righteous – and of the Unrighteous", is based on Acts 24:15 and says that people would rather think about immortality than work for salvation. Kierkegaard prefers to be uncertain about his salvation and continue to work. According to Gregor Malantschuk, this discourse highlights the difference between speculating about immortality and earnestly thinking about it. Kierkegaard creates an either-or statement: "Either one works unceasingly with all the effort of one’s soul, in fear and trembling, on self-concern’s thought, “whether one will oneself be saved,” and then one truly has no time or thought to doubt the salvation of others, nor does one care to. Or one has become completely sure about one's part – and then one has time to think about the salvation of others, time to step forward concerned and to shudder on their behalf, time to take positions and make gestures of concern, time to practice the art of looking horrified. In contrast, one shudders on behalf of someone else."

The fifth discourse, "We Are Closer to Salvation Now – Than When We Became Believers", is based on Romans 13:11 and is reminiscent of the discourse on all things serving us for good when we love God. Kierkegaard uses "now" and "when" as comparative terms, asking "when did you become a believer? If you know then you might be able to determine where you are now ... can a person be further away from his salvation than when he does not even know definitely whether he has begun to want to be saved?"

The sixth discourse, "But It Is Blessed – to Suffer Mockery for a Good Cause", is based on Matthew 5:10. One who is mocked is isolated from human society, and Kierkegaard uses Martin Luther as an example of someone who was mocked for righteousness' sake. He asks if Christendom would crucify Christ if he returned.

The effect the discourse will bring about depends on who the listener is. The difficulty with the essentially Christian emerges every time it is to be made present, every time it is to be said as it is and said now, at this moment, at this specific moment of actuality, and said to those, precisely to those who are living now. This is why people like to keep the essentially Christian at a distance.

The seventh discourse is based on 1 Timothy 3:16: "And great beyond all question is the mystery of godliness: God was revealed in the flesh, was justified in the Spirit, seen by angels, preached among the pagans, believed in the world, taken up in glory." According to Kierkegaard, the verse's most relevant phrase is "was believed in the world": "Take special care; if you are properly aware of this, it pertains to you alone, or it is for you as if it pertained only to you, you alone in the whole world!"

=== Part Four: Discourses at the Communion on Fridays ===
Kierkegaard delivered two of these discourses in Frue Church, but they lacked something. He begins these seven discourses with a prayer and discusses the Lord's Supper in relation to church attendance on Friday (rather than Sunday), to separate the individual from the crowd.

The first discourse, "I have longed with all my heart to eat this Passover with you before I suffer", is based on Luke 22:15. Christ was about to be betrayed by Judas and Peter; Kierkegaard touches on that briefly before discussing "heartfelt longing", a blessing "awakened in our souls" which can be remembered.

The second discourse, "Come here to me, all who labor and are burdened, and I will give you rest", is based on Matthew 11:28. Kierkegaard published Practice in Christianity in 1850, and based half of that book on the same verse. The discourse focuses on "longing for God that you carry silently and humbly in your heart," because it is the "one thing needful".

So it was an invitation: Come here, all you who labor and are burdened; and the invitation included a requirement: that the invited one labor, burdened in the consciousness of sins. And there is the trustworthy inviter, he who still stands there by his words and invites all. God grant that the one who is seeking may also find, that the one who is seeking the right thing may also find the one thing needful, that the one who is seeking the right place may also find rest for the soul. It is certainly a restful position when you kneel at the foot of the altar but God grant that this truly be only a dim intimation of your soul’s finding rest in God through the consciousness of the forgiveness of sins.

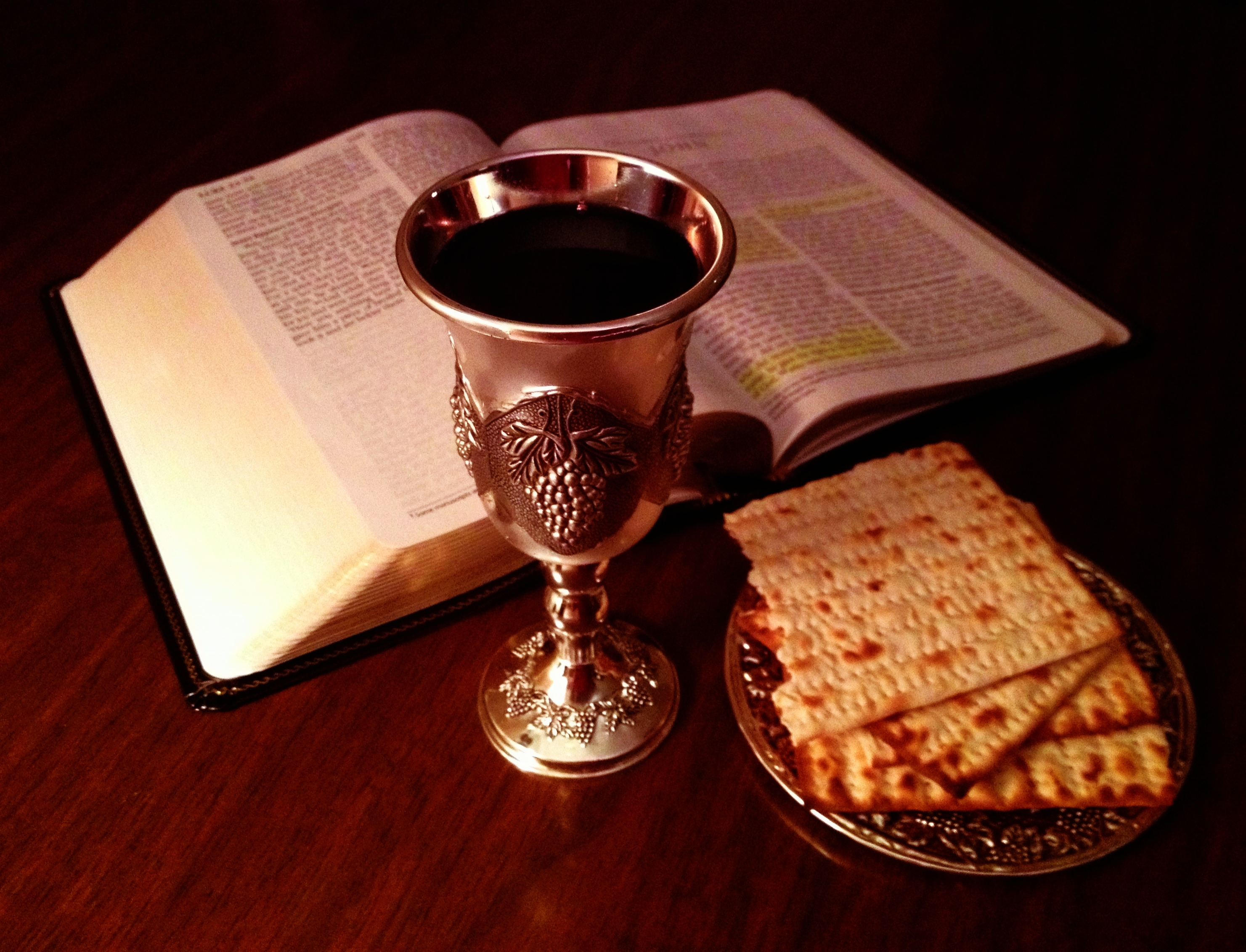
Kierkegaard recommended Friday communion.

The third discourse, "My sheep hear my voice, and I know them, and they follow me", is based on John 10:27. Kierkegaard prefers Friday Communion to Sunday because believers "inwardly made the decision to come."

When the congregation gathers in great numbers on the festival days, he knows them also, and those he does not know are not his own. Yet on such an occasion, someone may easily deceive himself, as if the single individual were concealed in the crowd. Not so at the Communion table; however many assembled there, indeed even if all were assembled at the Communion table; there is no crowd at the Communion table. He is himself personally present, and he knows those who are his own. He knows you whoever you are, known by many or unknown by all; if you are his own, he knows you.

The fourth discourse, "The Lord Jesus, on the night he was betrayed", is based on 1 Corinthians 11:23 and asks if we betray Christ by not remembering him at the Lord's Supper. The fifth discourse, "If we deny, he also will deny us; if we are faithless, he still remains faithful; he cannot deny himself", is based on 2 Timothy 2:12-13.

We let the terrifying thought pass by, not as something that does not pertain to us – oh, no, in that way no one is saved; as long as one lives it is still possible that one could be lost. as long as there is life there is hope – but as long as there is life there certainly is also the possibility of danger, consequently of fear, and consequently, there will be fear and trembling just as long. We let the terrifying thought pass by, but then we trust to God that we dare to let it pass by and to cross over as we take comfort in the Gospel’s gentle word.

The sixth discourse, "Even if our hearts condemn us, God is greater than our hearts", is based on 1 John 3:20.

... everyone can of course see the rainbow and must marvel when he sees it. But the sign of God’s greatness in showing mercy is only for faith; this sign is indeed the sacrament. God’s greatness in nature is manifest, but God’s greatness in showing mercy is first an occasion for offense and then is for faith. When God had created everything, he looked at it and behold, “it was all very good,” and every one of his works seems to bear the appendage: Praise, thank, worship the Creator. But appended to his greatness in showing mercy is: Blessed is he who is not offended.

The seventh and final discourse, "And it happened, as he blessed them, he was parted from them", is based on Luke 24:51.

At the Communion table you are capable of nothing at all. Satisfaction is made there – but by someone else; the sacrifice is offered – but by someone else; the Atonement is accomplished – by the Redeemer. All the more clear it therefore becomes that the blessing is everything and does everything. At the Communion table you are capable of less than nothing.

== Reception ==
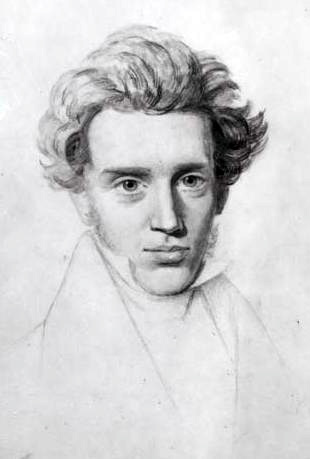
Kierkegaard wrote a number of books for Christian readers.

Kierkegaard published Christian Discourses on April 26, 1848, several months before publishing The Crisis and a Crisis in the Life of an Actress (July 24–27). Christian Discourses were published by C.A. Reitzel and The Crisis in the Danish newspaper Fædrelandet (The Fatherland). The first book is religious, and the second is about Johanne Luise Heiberg (1812–1890). Kierkegaard had done the same thing with Either/Or (aesthetic) and Two Upbuilding Discourses (ethical-religious), both published in 1843.

Contemporary reception of the book was sparse, with no reviews and three "appreciative letters". A second edition was published in 1862. Walter Lowrie translated the book into English in 1940, including The Lily of the Field and the Bird of the Air (1849) and Three Discourses at the Communion on Fridays (1849) in his translation. Lowrie included an account of efforts to translate Kierkegaard's works into English. Howard and Edna Hong translated Christian Discourses and The Crisis and a Crisis in the Life of an Actress in one volume in 1997, and Howard Hong said that Kierkegaard intended to "terminate his writing" that year.

David F. Swenson mentioned Christian Discourses in his 1920 article on Kierkegaard: "Christian Discourses contains in the first part a treatment of the anxieties of the pagan mind, the anxieties of poverty, of wealth, of lowliness, of high position, of presumption, of self-torture, of doubt, inconstancy and despair," devoting a discourse to each; second, a series of discourses on the Christian gospel of suffering; third, a number of discourses critical of the prevailing religious situation under the caption: 'Thoughts which wound from behind—in order to edify'; and fourth, a treatment in sermon form of the Christian doctrine of the Atonement, seven discourses on the Lord's supper. The following significant motto is attached to the third section: 'Christianity needs no defense, and cannot be served by means of any defense—Christianity is always on the offensive. To defend Christianity is the most indefensible of all distortions of it, the most confusing and the most dangerous—it is unconsciously and cunningly to betray it. Christianity is always on the offensive; in Christendom, consequently, it attacks from behind.' Here we meet with the first definite anticipation of the attack which Kierkegaard was soon to make upon the open or tacit assumption, current in Christendom, of an established Christian order."

Christian Discourses was begun immediately after Kierkegaard completed Works of Love in August 1847 and was completed in early February 1848, a few days before revolution in Paris set in motion events which led to the March rising in Slesvig and Holstein and the popular movement in Copenhagen which gave parliamentary government to Denmark. Kierkegaard regarded the discourses as incendiary to the conservative establishment that was passing away and the liberal order that appeared to be replacing it. Kierkegaard affirmed that Christianity meant "staking all upon uncertainty" and "venturing far out" into the unknown; Christian faith involved a personal encounter without the deceptive security of rational belief; the importance of the personal relationship dispensed with the need for a defence (or proof) of the truth of Christianity.

Kierkegaard used striking phrases, unusual imagery and paradox in the book to engage the reader. He laid the groundwork for the attack on Christendom in the second and third parts of his book by emphasizing that Christianity is a redemptive faith but it is also a demanding faith. Bradly Dewey said that a reader of Christian Discourses should not "ponder Kierkegaard's faith and forget your own", but a power, fervor and passion course through Kierkegaard's Christian works. Kierkegaard elaborated the Christological argument by giving an increasingly-polemical shape to narrative discourse, offering another version of the subjective method of overcoming doubt. He called it irrational to want to deal with doubt about Christianity by demonstrating its truth philosophically, and "the best means against all doubt about the truth of this doctrine of Christianity is self-concern and fear and trembling with regard to whether one is oneself a believer."

== Translations ==
- Christian Discourses, The Lilies of the Field and the Birds of the Air, and The Discourses at the Communion on Fridays (April 26, 1848) Translated by Walter Lowrie (1940, 1961) ISBN 0-691-01973-8
- Christian Discourses; The Crisis and a Crisis in the Life of an Actress, edited and translated with introduction and notes by Howard V. Hong and Edna H. Hong. Princeton University Press (1997) ISBN 0-691-01649-6
