= Matthew 12:12 =

- ← 12:11 12:13 →
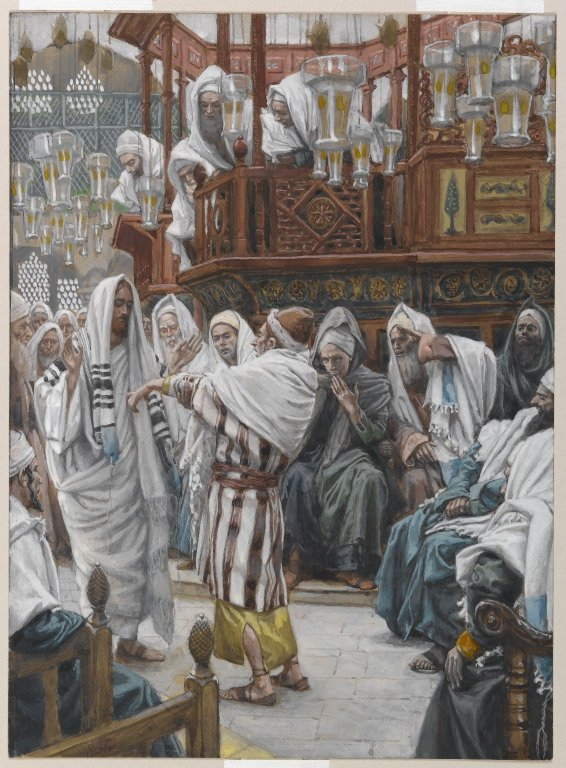
- "The Man with the Withered Hand". Painting by James Tissot (1886-1894). Brooklyn Museum
- Book: Gospel of Matthew
- Christian Bible part: New Testament

Matthew 12:12 is the twelfth verse in the twelfth chapter of the Gospel of Matthew in the New Testament.

== Content ==
In the original Greek according to Westcott-Hort, this verse is:

Πόσῳ οὖν διαφέρει ἄνθρωπος προβάτου. Ὥστε ἔξεστι τοῖς σάββασι καλῶς ποιεῖν.

In the King James Version of the Bible the text reads:

How much then is a man better than a sheep? Wherefore it is lawful to do well on the sabbath days.

The New International Version translates the passage as:

How much more valuable is a man than a sheep! Therefore it is lawful to do good on the Sabbath."

== Analysis ==
Jesus' point here is that if it is lawful to free a sheep on the Sabbath, why not a person? In particular, because lifting out a sheep would need much more labour than a person. Yet here Christ was about to heal the sick man with one word, which could not be construed as a servile work. So Mark adds that He looked round about upon them with anger, being grieved at the hardness of their hearts.

== Commentary from the Church Fathers ==
Jerome: " Thus He answers their question in such a way as to convict the questioners of covetousness. If ye on the sabbath, saith He, would hasten to lift out a sheep or any other animal that might have fallen into a pit, not for the sake of the animal, but to preserve your own property, how much more ought I to deliver a man who is so much better than a sheep?"

Glossa Ordinaria: " Thus He answers their question with a suitable example, so as to show that they profane the sabbath by works of covetousness who were charging Him with profaning it by works of charity; evil interpreters of the Law, who say that on the sabbath we ought to rest from good deeds, when it is only evil deeds from which we ought to rest. As it is said, Ye shall do no servile work therein, (Lev. 23:3) that is, no sin. Thus in the everlasting rest, we shall rest only from evil, and not from good."

Augustine: " After this comparison concerning the sheep, He concludes that it is lawful to do good on the sabbath day, saying, Therefore it is lawful to do good on the sabbath."

Chrysostom: " Observe how He shows many reasons for this breaking of the sabbath. But forasmuch as the man was incurably sick, He proceeds straightway to the work, as it follows, Then saith he to the man, Reach forth thy hand: and he reached it forth, and it was restored whole as the other."

Jerome: " In the Gospel which the Nazarenes and Ebionites use, and which we have lately translated into Greek out of the Hebrew, and which many regard as the genuine Matthew, this man who has the withered hand is described as a builder, and he makes his prayer in these words, ‘I was a builder, and gained my living by the labour of my hands; I pray thee, Jesus, to restore me to health, that I may not disgracefully beg my bread.’"

Rabanus Maurus: " Jesus teaches and works chiefly on the sabbath, not only on account of the spiritual sabbath, but on account of the gathering together of the people, seeking that all should be saved."

Hilary of Poitiers: " Figuratively After their departure from the corn field, from which the Apostles had received the fruits of their sowing, He came to the Synagogue, there also to make ready the work of His harvest; for there were afterwards many with the Apostles who were healed."

== See also ==
- Healing the man with a withered hand
- Miracles of Jesus

Preceded by Matthew 12:11	Gospel of Matthew; Chapter 12	Succeeded by Matthew 12:13
