= Matthew 12:11 =

- ← 12:10 12:12 →
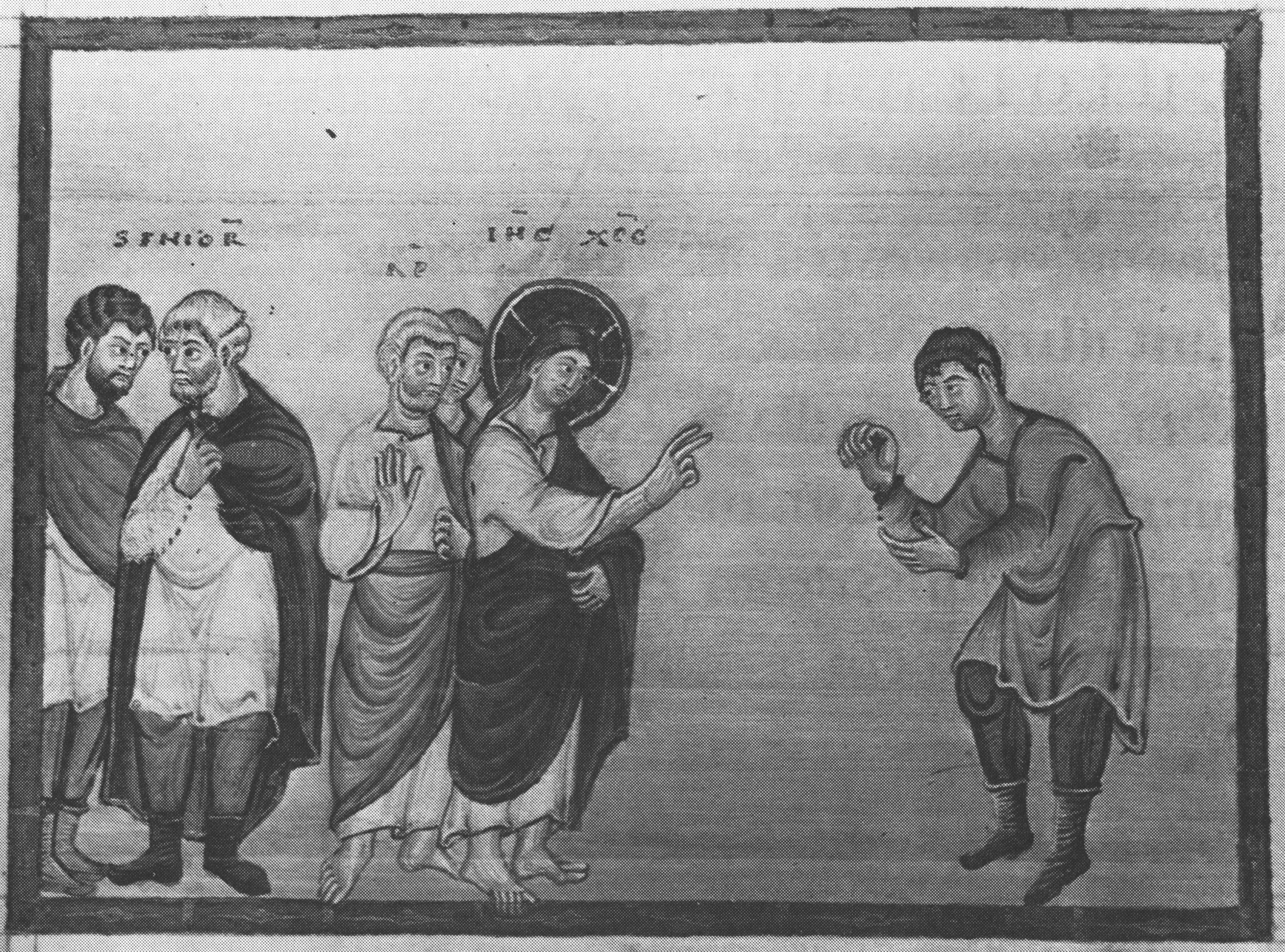
- "Healing of the man with the withered hand". Codex Egberti, Fol 23v (980-993). City library of Trier (Cod.24).
- Book: Gospel of Matthew
- Christian Bible part: New Testament

Matthew 12:11 is the eleventh verse in the twelfth chapter of the Gospel of Matthew in the New Testament.

== Content ==
In the original Greek according to Westcott-Hort, this verse is:

Ὁ δὲ εἶπεν αὐτοῖς, Τίς ἔσται ἐξ ὑμῶν ἄνθρωπος, ὃς ἕξει πρόβατον ἕν, καὶ ἐὰν ἐμπέσῃ τοῦτο τοῖς σάββασιν εἰς βόθυνον, οὐχὶ κρατήσει αὐτὸ καὶ ἐγερεῖ;

In the King James Version of the Bible the text reads:

And he said unto them, What man shall there be among you, that shall have one sheep, and if it fall into a pit on the sabbath day, will he not lay hold on it, and lift it out?

The New International Version translates the passage as:

He said to them, "If any of you has a sheep and it falls into a pit on the Sabbath, will you not take hold of it and lift it out?

== Analysis ==
Here Jesus points to the Jewish practice of the time in which if a sheep fell into a ditch on the Sabbath day, it was lawful to pull it out so that the sheep not remain there and suffer hunger, on the Sabbath. Likely also if a sheep were drowning on the Sabbath. His point is that it must be the more lawful to release on the Sabbath someone afflicted with sickness.

== Commentary from the Church Fathers ==
Augustine: " But it may raise enquiry how Matthew can say that they asked the Lord, Whether it were lawful to heal on the sabbath, seeing Mark and Luke relate that it was the Lord who asked them, Whether it is lawful on the sabbath day to do good or to do evil? (Luke 6:9) It is to be understood then that they first asked the Lord, Is it lawful to heal on the sabbath day? Then understanding their thoughts that they sought an occasion to accuse Him, He placed in the midst him whom He was about to heal, and put to them the question which Mark and Luke say that He did ask; and when they remained silent, He made the comparison respecting the sheep, and concluded that they might do good on the sabbath day; as it follows, But he said unto them, What man shall there be among you, that shall have one sheep, and if it fall into a pit on the sabbath day, will he not lay hold on it, and lift it out?"

== See also ==
- Healing the man with a withered hand
- Miracles of Jesus

Preceded by Matthew 12:10	Gospel of Matthew; Chapter 12	Succeeded by Matthew 12:12
