= Matthew 12:10 =

- ← 12:9 12:11 →
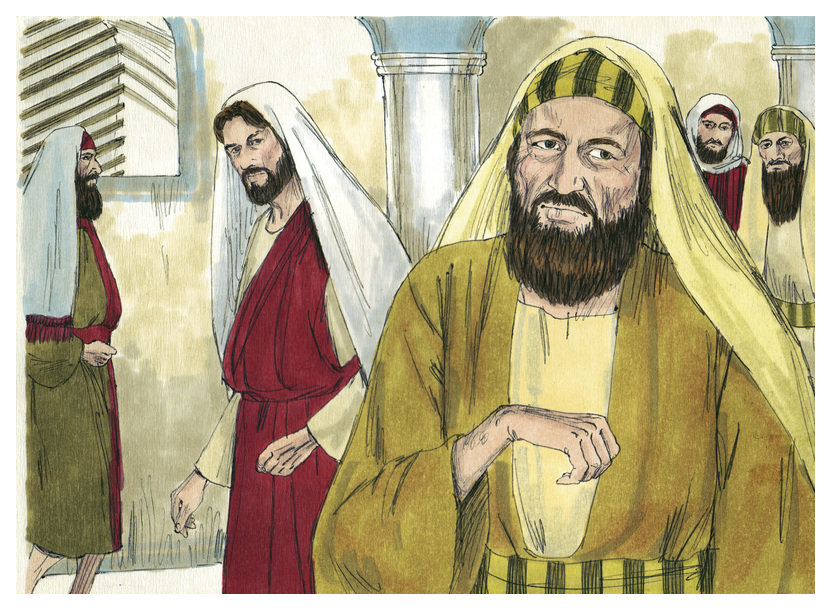
- "Jesus and the man with a withered hand" (Bible Illustrations by Jim Padgett, Sweet Media, 1984)
- Book: Gospel of Matthew
- Christian Bible part: New Testament

Matthew 12:10 is the tenth verse in the twelfth chapter of the Gospel of Matthew in the New Testament.

== Content ==
In the original Greek according to Westcott-Hort, this verse is:

Καὶ ἰδού, ἄνθρωπος ἦν τὴν χεῖρα ἔχων ξηράν· καὶ ἐπηρώτησαν αὐτόν, λέγοντες, Εἰ ἔξεστι τοῖς σάββασι θεραπεύειν; ἵνα κατηγορήσωσιν αὐτοῦ.

In the King James Version of the Bible the text reads:

And, behold, there was a man which had his hand withered. And they asked him, saying, Is it lawful to heal on the sabbath days? that they might accuse him.

The New International Version translates the passage as:

and a man with a shriveled hand was there. Looking for a reason to accuse Jesus, they asked him, "Is it lawful to heal on the Sabbath?"

== Analysis ==
"They," here is said to be the Scribes and Pharisees who asked Christ, whether it was lawful to heal on the Sabbath? Then, Mark relates that Christ asked the Scribes a question, which solved the question. That is, if it were lawful to do good on the Sabbath, and heal the withered hand? He seems to imply that not to do good to one in misery, when it is in one's power, is evil. In terms of accusing Him, it appears to be with the aim of making Him out to be either powerless or unmerciful.

== Commentary from the Church Fathers ==
Hilary of Poitiers: "When He was entered into the synagogue, they bring a man of a withered hand, asking Him whether it was lawful to heal on the sabbath day, seeking an occasion of convicting Him out of His answer; as it follows, And they brought him a man haring a withered hand, and asked him, saying, Is it lawful to heal on the sabbath day?"

Chrysostom: "They do not ask that they may learn, but that they may accuse Him; as it follows, that they might accuse him. Though the action itself would have been enough, yet they sought occasion against Him in His words also, thus providing for themselves greater matter of complaint."

Jerome: "And they ask Him whether it is lawful to heal on the sabbath day, that if He should refuse, they might charge Him with cruelty, or want of power; if He should heal him, they might charge Him with transgressing the Law."

== See also ==
- Healing the man with a withered hand

| Preceded by Matthew 12:9 | Gospel of Matthew; Chapter 12 | Succeeded by Matthew 12:11 |
