= The Lily of the Field and the Bird of the Air =

1849 book by Søren Kierkegaard

- Author: Søren Kierkegaard
- Original title: Lilien paa Marken og Fuglen under Himlen
- Translator: Walter Lowrie 1940 Bruce Kirmmse 2016
- Language: Danish
- Series: Second authorship (Discourses)
- Genre: Christianity, psychology
- Publisher: C.A. Reitzel
- Publication date: May 14, 1849
- Publication place: Denmark
- English publication date: 1940 – first English translation
- Media type: paperback
- Pages: 43
- ISBN: 978-0691019734
- Preceded by: The Crisis and a Crisis in the Life of an Actress
- Followed by: Two Minor Ethical-Religious Essays

The Lily of the Field and the Bird of the Air is a book written by Søren Kierkegaard.

== History ==
Søren Kierkegaard published The Lily of the Field and the Bird of the Air as three Godly discourses, differing from his Upbuilding and Various Discourses, on May 14, 1849. This is one of the four books he published that year. It was first translated by Walter Lowrie in 1940 and then again by Bruce Kirmmse in 2016. Kierkegaard said in his journals that the structure of these "indescribably uplifting" discourses would be: the first is esthetic, the second ethical, the third religious.

Kierkegaard uses Matthew 6 verse 24 and following as the text for these sermons for the fifteenth Sunday after Trinity. He zeroes in on these verses from the Sermon on the Mount in particular: Behold the birds of the heaven, that they sow not, neither do they read, nor gather into barns; and your heavenly Father feedeth them all. Are not ye of much more value than they? And which of you by being anxious can add one cubit unto the measure of his life? And why are ye anxious concerning raiment? Consider the lilies of the field, how they grow; and they toil not, neither do they spin: yet I say unto you, that even Solomon in all his glory was not arrayed like one of these.

The discourses are dedicated to ‘that single individual whom I with joy and gratitude call my reader’ in a Preface written on his birthday, May 5. The second edition of Either/or was published on the very same day as this book was published. He said this in his Journals, "It will never do to let the second edition of Either/Or be published without something accompanying it. Somehow the accent must be that I have made up my mind about being a religious author." He had hinted at silence by using Johannes de silentio (John of the Silence) as his pseudonym to his 1843 book Fear and Trembling. And he wrote about the birds in the air in 1847 in his Edifying Discourses in Diverse Spirits

== Discourses ==
=== First Godly Discourse ===
Kierkegaard emphasized finding God in the "darkness" and the "stillness" in a previous discourse. He returned to the same theme by emphasizing silence in this first discourse. He says, "From the lilies and the birds as teachers let us learn Silence, or learn to be silent." This is his esthetic discourse.

For the instant, although it is pregnant with rich significance, sends no messenger before it to announce its arrival, it comes too suddenly for that, when it comes there is not an instant’s time before its coming; nor, however significant the instant is in itself, does it come with noise and outcry; no, it comes quietly, with lighter step than any creature’s lightest tread, for it comes with the light step of the sudden, it comes stealing upon one, therefore one must be quite silent if one is to sense that ‘now it is there’; and the next instant it is gone, therefore one must have been quite silent if one is to succeed in employing it. But yet everything depends upon the instant. And this doubtless is the misfortune in the lives of the great majority of men, that they never sense the instant, that in their lives the eternal and the temporal are merely separate things. And why? Because they could not keep silent. (p. 326)

=== Second Godly Discourse ===
Just as Kierkegaard emphasized stages along life's way in his pseudonymous writings so he does the same with his religious writings. After the reader has learned silence from the lilies of the field and birds of the air so now attention is turned to a lesson in "obedience". This is the ethical discourse. How can one stay on the right side of God's Either/or? Kierkegaard is always stressing the how over the what.

He says, "If thou couldst become as obedient as the lilies and the birds, thou wouldst also by obedience be able to learn obedience from thyself." Silence is the first prerequisite for obedience. (p. 336 Lowrie) Kierkegaard asks how it is that the lilies and the birds hit the mark of the unconditional so well and answers: "The unconditional gives them the marvelous sureness with which makes them teachers in obedience." (p. 338)

To be completely oneself and to preserve one’s identity ... it is fully and completely itself ... it became actually its whole possibility. (p. 339-340)

=== Third Godly Discourse ===
Now that Kierkegaard has his reader learning lessons from the lilies and the birds he turns to his third lesson: joyfulness. These "joyous schoolmasters" are unconditionally joyful and therefore joy itself. (p. 348) They possess in the strictest sense at first hand the matter in which they give instruction. (p. 349) This is his religious discourse.

What is joy? Or what is it to be joyful? It is to be present to oneself; but to be truly present to oneself is this thinking of ‘today’, that is, this thing of being today, of truly being today. (p. 349)

== Reception ==
Bruce Kirmmse compared Kierkegaard to Thoreau in his introduction to this book, saying: "Thus, as a "naturalist" Kierkegaard made use of nature far more radically than did Thoreau, allowing the lily and the bird to point to something invisible but real that lay beyond the visible world." The Cambridge Companion to Kierkegaard called these discourses "explicitly Christian themes"
