= Matthew 12:13 =

- ← 12:12 12:14 →
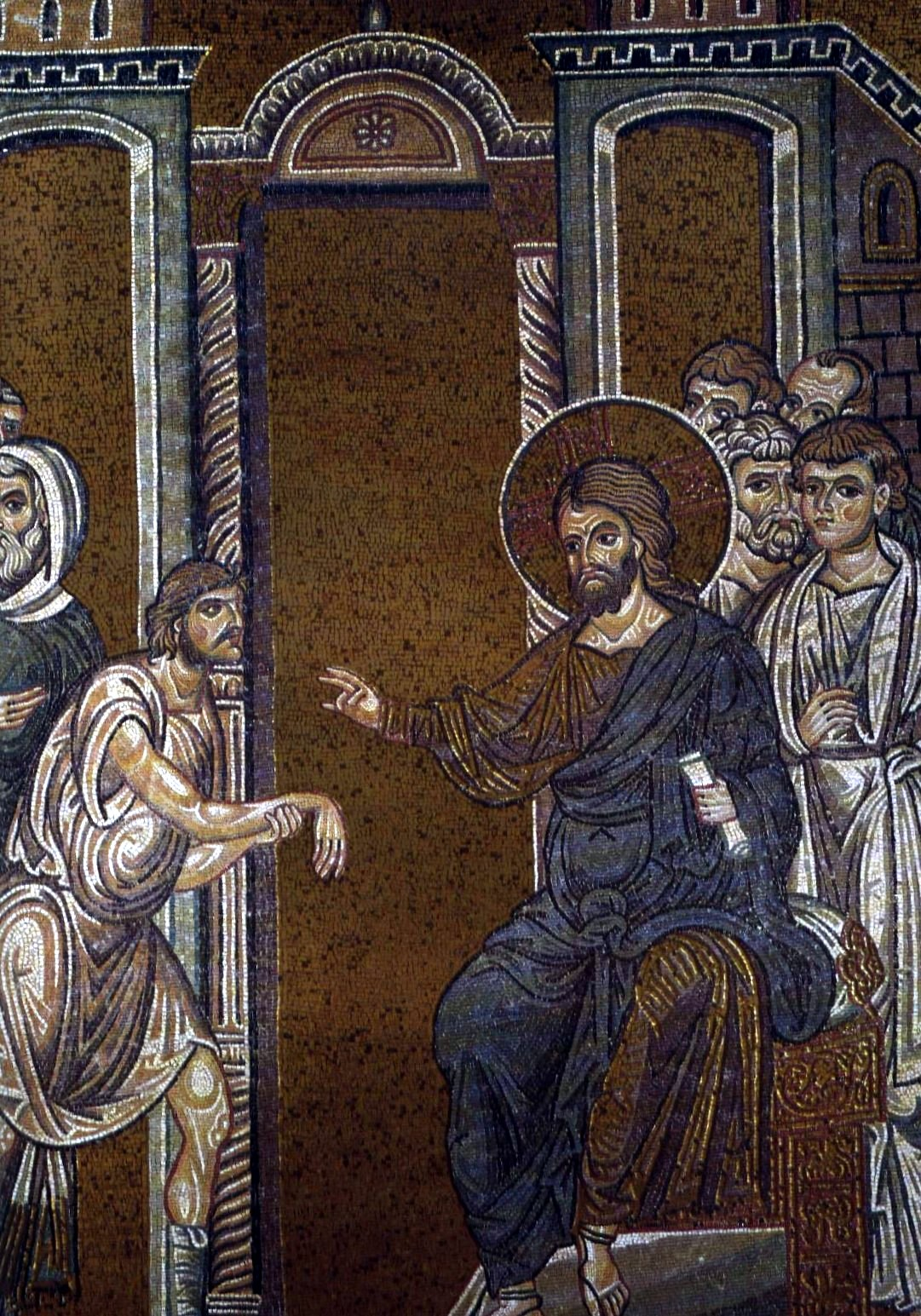
- Christ healing the man with a withered hand, Byzantine mosaic.
- Book: Gospel of Matthew
- Christian Bible part: New Testament

Matthew 12:13 is the thirteenth verse in the twelfth chapter of the Gospel of Matthew in the New Testament.

== Content ==
In the original Greek according to Westcott-Hort, this verse is:

Τότε λέγει τῷ ἀνθρώπῳ, Ἔκτεινον τὴν χεῖρά σου. Καὶ ἐξέτεινε, καὶ ἀποκατεστάθη ὑγιὴς ὡς ἡ ἄλλη.

In the King James Version of the Bible the text reads:

Then saith he to the man, Stretch forth thine hand. And he stretched it forth; and it was restored whole, like as the other.

The New International Version translates the passage as:

Then he said to the man, "Stretch out your hand." So he stretched it out and it was completely restored, just as sound as the other.

== Analysis ==
In Mark 3:3 and Luke 6:8 we learn that before performing this miracle, Jesus instructed the sick man to "stand up in the midst," and that the man, displaying confidence in Jesus' power, immediately complied. He likely did this to call attention to the miracle He was about to do, hoping to move the Pharisees to mercy. The emphasis seems to be on Jesus telling the man to stretch out his hand, so that it was clear he was not doing work on the Sabbath.

== Commentary from the Church Fathers ==
Jerome: " Until the coming of the Lord the Saviour, there was the withered hand in the Synagogue of the Jews, and the works of the Lord were not done in it; but when He came upon earth, the right hand was restored in the Apostles who believed, and given back to its former occupation."

Hilary of Poitiers: " All healing is done by the word; and the hand is restored as the other; that is, made like to the ministry of the Apostles in the business of bestowing salvation; and it teaches the Pharisees that they should not be displeased that the work of human salvation is done by the Apostles, seeing that if they would believe, their own hand would be made able to the ministry of the same duty."

Rabanus Maurus: " Otherwise; The man who had the withered hand denotes the human race in its barrenness of good works dried up by the hand which was stretched out to the fruit; (Gen. 3:6.) this was healed by the stretching out of the innocent hand on the Cross. And well is this withered hand said to have been in the Synagogue, for where the gift of knowledge is greater, there is the greater danger of an irrecoverable infliction. The withered hand when it is to be healed is first bid to be stretched out, because the weakness of a barren mind is healed by no means better than by liberality of almsgiving. A man’s right hand is affected when he is remiss in giving alms, his left whole when he is attentive to his own interests. But when the Lord comes, the right hand is restored whole as the left, because what he had got together greedily, that he distributes freely."

== See also ==
- Healing the man with a withered hand
- Miracles of Jesus

Preceded by Matthew 12:12	Gospel of Matthew; Chapter 12	Succeeded by Matthew 12:14
