= Matthew 12:8 =

- ← 12:7 12:9 →
- Book: Gospel of Matthew
- Christian Bible part: New Testament

Matthew 12:8 is the eighth verse in the twelfth chapter of the Gospel of Matthew in the New Testament.

== Content ==
In the original Greek according to Westcott-Hort, this verse is:

Κύριος γάρ ἐστι καὶ τοῦ σαββάτου ὁ υἱὸς τοῦ ἀνθρώπου.

In the King James Version of the Bible the text reads:

For the Son of man is Lord even of the sabbath day.

The New International Version translates the passage as:

For the Son of Man is Lord of the Sabbath.

== Analysis ==
The word "even" (KJV) is not in all Greek manuscripts. It seems to imply that Jesus is Lord over everything. This final reason is given to justify the actions of the disciples. Since they were dispensed by Jesus, who "was Lord even of the Sabbath", and thus could dispense or change its observance.

== Commentary from the Church Fathers ==
Chrysostom: " Observe again how in leading the discourse towards an apology for them, He shows His disciples to be above the need of any apology, and to be indeed blameless, as He had said above of the Priests. And He adds yet another plea which clears them of blame, For the Son of Man is Lord also of the sabbath."

Saint Remigius: " He calls Himself the Son of Man, and the meaning is, He whom ye suppose a mere man is God, the Lord of all creatures, and also of the sabbath, and He has therefore power to change the law after His pleasure, because He made it."

Augustine: " He did not forbid His disciples to pluck the ears of corn on the sabbath, that so He might convict both the Jews who then were, and the Manichæans who were to come, who will not pluck up a herb lest they should be committing a murder."

Hilary of Poitiers: " Figuratively; First consider that this discourse was held at that time, namely, when He had given thanks to the Father for giving salvation to the Gentiles. The field is the world, the sabbath is rest, the corn the ripening of them that believe for the harvest; thus His passing through the corn field on the sabbath, is the coming of the Lord into the world in the rest of the Law; the hunger of the disciples is their desire for the salvation of men."

Rabanus Maurus: " They pluck the ears of corn when they withdraw men from devotion to the world; they rub them in their hands when they tear away their hearts from the lusts of the flesh; they eat the grain when they transfer such as are amended into the body of the Church."

Augustine: " But no man passes into the body of Christ, until he has been stripped of his fleshly raiment; according to that of the Apostle, Put ye off the old man. (Eph. 4:22.)"

Rabanus Maurus: " This they do on the sabbath, that is in the hope of eternal rest, to which they invite others. Also they walk through the corn fields with the Lord, who have delight in meditating on the Scriptures; they are hungry while they desire to find the bread of life, that is the love of God, in them; they pluck the ears of corn and rub them in their hands, while they examine the testimonies to discover what lies hid under the letter, and this on the sabbath, that is, while they are free from disquieting thoughts."

Hilary of Poitiers: " The Pharisees, who thought that the key of the kingdom of heaven was in their hands, accused the disciples of doing what was not lawful to do; whereon the Lord reminded them of deeds in which, under the guise of facts, a prophecy was concealed; and that He might show the power of all things, He further added, that it contained the form of that work which was to be, Had ye known what that meaneth, I will have mercy; for the work of our salvation is not in the sacrifice of the Law, but in mercy; and the Law having ceased, we are saved by the mercy of God. Which gift if they had understood they would not have condemned the innocent, that is His Apostles, whom in their jealousy they were to accuse of having transgressed the Law, where the old sacrifices having ceased, the new dispensation of mercy came through them to the aid of all."

Preceded by Matthew 12:7	Gospel of Matthew; Chapter 12	Succeeded by Matthew 12:9
