= Matthew 11:30 =

- ← 11:29 12:1 →
- Book: Gospel of Matthew
- Christian Bible part: New Testament

Matthew 11:30 is the final verse in the eleventh chapter of the Gospel of Matthew in the New Testament.

== Content ==
In the original Greek according to Westcott-Hort this verse reads:

Ὁ γὰρ ζυγός μου χρηστός, καὶ τὸ φορτίον μου ἐλαφρόν ἐστιν.

In the King James Version of the Bible the text reads:

For my yoke is easy, and my burden is light.

The New International Version translates the passage as:

For my yoke is easy and my burden is light.

== Analysis ==
The yoke here is given in opposition to the yoke of sin and the Mosaic law, under which they had previous been groaning. The law of the Gospel is called a yoke, according to John McEvilly, because like every other law, "it binds us to certain duties, and forbids us to transgress certain limits". In the same way it is called a "burden" because "we are obliged to bear it, to live according to it, and to fulfil it".

== Commentary from the Church Fathers ==
Chrysostom: "And therefore in beginning the Divine Law He begins with humility, and sets before us a great reward, saying, And ye shall find rest for your souls. This is the highest reward, you shall not only be made useful to others, but shall make yourself to have peace; and He gives you the promise of it before it comes, but when it is come, you shall rejoice in perpetual rest. And that they might not be afraid because He had spoken of a burden, therefore He adds, For my yoke is pleasant, and my burden light."

Hilary of Poitiers: "He holds forth the inducements of a pleasant yoke, and a light burden, that to them that believe He may afford the knowledge of that good which He alone knoweth in the Father."

Gregory the Great: "What burden is it to put upon the neck of our mind that He bids us shun all desire that disturbs, and turn from the toilsome paths of this world?"

Hilary of Poitiers: "And what is more pleasant than that yoke, what lighter than that burden? To be made better, to abstain from wickedness, to choose the good, and refuse the evil, to love all men, to hate none, to gain eternal things, not to be taken with things present, to be unwilling to do that to another which yourself would be pained to suffer."

Rabanus Maurus: "But how is Christ’s yoke pleasant, seeing it was said above, Narrow is the way which leadeth unto life? (Mat. 7:14.) That which is entered upon by a narrow entrance is in process of time made broad by the unspeakable sweetness of love."

Augustine: "So then they who with unfearing neck have submitted to the yoke of the Lord endure such hardships and dangers, that they seem to be called not from labour to rest, but from rest to labour. But the Holy Spirit was there who, as the outward man decayed, renewed the inward man day by day, and giving a foretaste of spiritual rest in the rich pleasures of God in the hope of blessedness to come, smoothed all that seemed rough, lightened all that was heavy. Men suffer amputations and burnings, that at the price of sharper pain they may be delivered from torments less but more lasting, as boils or swellings. What storms and dangers will not merchants undergo that they may acquire perishing riches? Even those who love not riches endure the same hardships; but those that love them endure the same, but to them they are not hardships. For love makes right easy, and almost nought all things however dreadful and monstrous. How much more easily then does love do that for true happiness, which avarice does for misery as far as it can?"

Jerome: "And how is the Gospel lighter than the Law, seeing in the Law murder and adultery, but under the Gospel anger and concupiscence also, are punished? Because by the Law many things are commanded which the Apostle fully teaches us cannot be fulfilled; by the Law works are required, by the Gospel the will is sought for, which even if it goes not into act, yet does not lose its reward. The Gospel commands what we can do, as that we lust not; this is in our own power; the Law punishes not the will but the act, as adultery. Suppose a virgin to have been violated in time of persecution; as here was not the will she is held as a virgin under the Gospel; under the Law she is cast out as defiled."

== Uses ==
=== Music ===
The King James Version of this verse is cited as a text in the English-language oratorio "Messiah" by George Frideric Handel (HWV 56).

Preceded by Matthew 11:29	Gospel of Matthew; Chapter 11	Succeeded by Matthew 12:1
