= Matthew 11:29 =

- ← 11:28 11:30 →
- Book: Gospel of Matthew
- Christian Bible part: New Testament

Matthew 11:29 is the 29th verse in the eleventh chapter of the Gospel of Matthew in the New Testament.

== Content ==
In the original Greek according to Westcott-Hort, this verse is:

Ἄρατε τὸν ζυγόν μου ἐφ᾿ ὑμᾶς καὶ μάθετε ἀπ᾿ ἐμοῦ, ὅτι πρᾷός εἰμι καὶ ταπεινὸς τῇ καρδίᾳ· καὶ εὑρήσετε ἀνάπαυσιν ταῖς ψυχαῖς ὑμῶν.

In the King James Version of the Bible the text reads:

Take my yoke upon you, and learn of me; for I am meek and lowly in heart: and ye shall find rest unto your souls.

The New International Version translates the passage as:

Take my yoke upon you and learn from me, for I am gentle and humble in heart, and you will find rest for your souls.

== Analysis ==
Classical Catholic commentaries note that the "old burden" is said to refer to "the old law of sin and concupiscence", while the new yoke is the evangelical law of grace and charity. It is called a yoke because "it is a law binding the soul". The rest (ἀνάπαυσιν) or refreshment Lapide says is the alleviation from the Mosaic ceremonies. Referring to these words, Pope John Paul II says that "only once, perhaps, did the Lord Jesus refer to his own heart, in his own words".

== Commentary from the Church Fathers ==
Gregory the Great: "For a cruel yoke and hard weight of servitude it is to be subject to the things of time, to be ambitious of the things of earth, to cling to falling things, to seek to stand in things that stand not, to desire things that pass away, but to be unwilling to pass away with them. For while all things fly away against our wish, those things which had first harassed the mind in desire of gaining them, now oppress it with fear of losing them."

Chrysostom: "He said not, Come ye, this man and that man, but All whosoever are in trouble, in sorrow, or in sin, not that I may exact punishment of you, but that I may remit your sins. Come ye, not that I have need of your glory, but that I seek your salvation. And I will refresh you; not, I will save you, only; but that is much greater, I will refresh you, that is, I will set you in all quietness."

Rabanus Maurus: "I will not only take from you your burden, but will satisfy you with inward refreshment."

Saint Remigius: "Come, He says, not with the feet, but with the life, not in the body, but in faith. For that is a spiritual approach by which any man approaches God; and therefore it follows, Take my yoke upon you."

Rabanus Maurus: "The yoke of Christ is Christ’s Gospel, which joins and yokes together Jews and Gentiles in the unity of the faith. This we are commanded to take upon us, that is, to have in honour; lest perchance setting it beneath us, that is wrongly despising it, we should trample upon it with the miry feet of unholiness; wherefore He adds, Learn of me."

Augustine: "Not to create a world, or to do miracles in that world; but that I am meek and lowly in heart. Wouldest thou be great? Begin with the least. Wouldest thou build up a mighty fabric of greatness? First think of the foundation of humility; for the mightier building any seeks to raise, the deeper let him dig for his foundation. Whither is the summit of our building to rise? To the sight of God."

Rabanus Maurus: "We must learn then from our Saviour to be meek in temper, and lowly in mind; let us hurt none, let us despise none, and the virtues which we have shown in deed let us retain in our heart."

== Musical usage ==
The King James Version of this verse is used as a text in the English-language oratorio "Messiah" by George Frideric Handel (HWV 56).

| Preceded by Matthew 11:28 | Gospel of Matthew; Chapter 11 | Succeeded by Matthew 11:30 |
