= Matthew 12:6 =

- ← 12:5 12:7 →
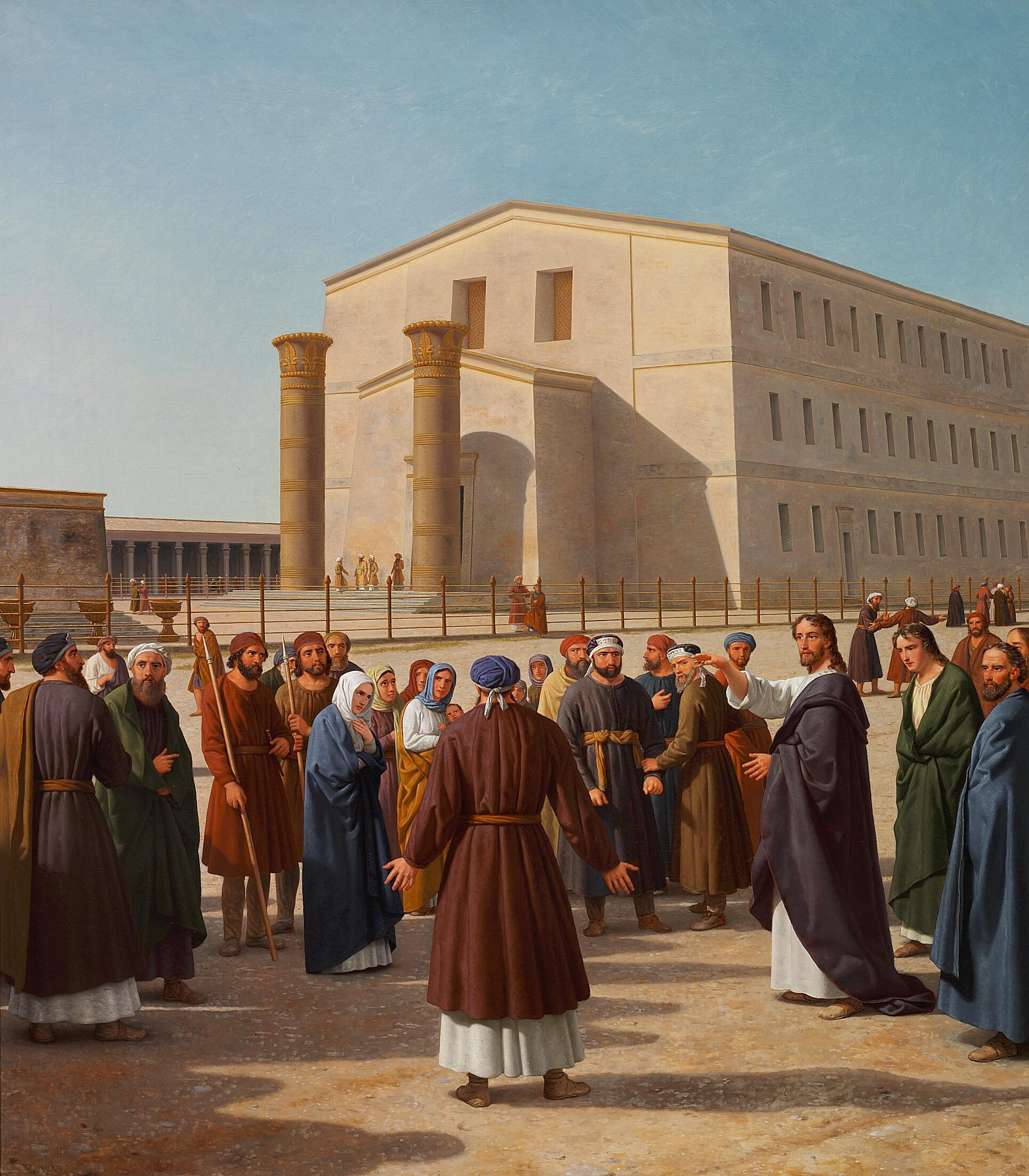
- "Dispute of Jesus and the Pharisees" by Christoffer Wilhelm Eckersberg (1843).
- Book: Gospel of Matthew
- Christian Bible part: New Testament

Matthew 12:6 is the sixth verse in the twelfth chapter of the Gospel of Matthew in the New Testament.

== Content ==
In the original Greek according to Westcott-Hort, this verse is:

Λέγω δὲ ὑμῖν ὅτι τοῦ ἱεροῦ μείζων ἐστιν ὧδε.

In the King James Version of the Bible the text reads:

But I say unto you, That in this place is one greater than the temple.

The New International Version translates the passage as:

I tell you that one greater than the temple is here.

== Analysis ==
Out of modesty, Christ refers to Himself in the third person. According to Lapide, the meaning of the verse is that if the holiness of the temple makes the sacrificing priests blameless, who break the Sabbath, in like manner the disciples, since Jesus is greater and holier than the temple. And in fact, as God, Jesus is considered the Lord of the temple and the recipient of the sacrifices.

== Commentary from the Church Fathers ==
Chrysostom: " But that you should not say to me, that to find an instance of another’s sin is not to excuse our own—indeed where the thing done and not the doer of it is accused, we excuse the thing done. But this is not enough, He said what is yet more, that they are blameless. But see how great things He brings in; first, the place, in the Temple; secondly, the time, on the sabbath; the setting aside the Law, in the word profane, not merely break; and that they are not only free from punishment but from blame; and are blameless. And this second instance is not like the first which He gave respecting David; for that was done but once, by David who was not a Priest, and was a case of necessity; but this second is done every sabbath, and by the Priests, and according to the Law. So that not only by indulgence, as the first case would establish, but by the strict law the disciples are to be held blameless. But are the disciples Priests? yea, they are yet greater than Priests, forasmuch as He was there who is the Lord of the Temple, who is the reality and not the type; and therefore it is added, But I say unto you, one greater than the Temple is here."

Jerome: " The word Hic is not a pronoun, but an adverb of place here, for that place is greater than the Temple which contains the Lord of the Temple."

Augustine: " It should be observed, that one example is taken from royal persons, as David, the other from priestly, as those who profane the sabbath for the service of the Temple, so that much less can the charge concerning the rubbing the ears of corn attach to Him who is indeed King and Priest."

Preceded by Matthew 12:5	Gospel of Matthew; Chapter 12	Succeeded by Matthew 12:7
