= Matthew 11:27 =

- ← 11:26 11:28 →
- Book: Gospel of Matthew
- Christian Bible part: New Testament

Matthew 11:27 is the 27th verse in the eleventh chapter of the Gospel of Matthew in the New Testament.

== Content ==
In the original Greek according to Westcott-Hort, this verse is:

Πάντα μοι παρεδόθη ὑπὸ τοῦ πατρός μου· καὶ οὐδεὶς ἐπιγινώσκει τὸν υἱόν, εἰ μὴ ὁ πατήρ· οὐδὲ τὸν πατέρα τις ἐπιγινώσκει, εἰ μὴ ὁ υἱός, καὶ ᾧ ἐὰν βούληται ὁ υἱὸς ἀποκαλύψαι.

In the King James Version of the Bible the text reads:

All things are delivered unto me of my Father: and no man knoweth the Son, but the Father; neither knoweth any man the Father, save the Son, and he to whomsoever the Son will reveal him.

The New International Version translates the passage as:

"All things have been committed to me by my Father. No one knows the Son except the Father, and no one knows the Father except the Son and those to whom the Son chooses to reveal him.

== Analysis ==
"All Things are delivered unto me" appears to imply that "through the Son alone, the father works, teaches, and bestows His gifts".

"No one knows..." shows that God the Father communicates the knowledge of Himself and everything else to the Son, and through Him to the rest of humanity. The question is, if the Holy Spirit is excluded from this relation between the Father and Son, however Theologians say this is not the case in the Godhead. Marcion rejected the Old Testament based on this verse, since he claimed that no one could have known God before Christ came.

== Commentary from the Church Fathers ==
Chrysostom: "Because He had said, I confess unto thee, Father, because thou hast hid these things from the wise, that you should not suppose that He thus thanks the Father as though He Himself was excluded from this power, He adds, All things are committed to me by my Father. Hearing the words are committed, do not admit suspicion of any thing human, for He uses this word that you may not think there be two gods unbegotten. For at the time that He was begotten He was Lord of all."

Jerome: "For if we conceive of this thing according to our weakness, when he who receives begins to have, he who gives begins to be without. Or when He says, All things are committed to him, He may mean, not the heaven and earth and the elements, and the rest of the things which He created and made, but those who through the Son have access to the Father."

Hilary of Poitiers: "Or that we may not think that there is any thing less in Him than in God, therefore He says this."

Augustine: "For if He has aught less in His power than the Father has, then all that the Father has, are not His; for by begetting Him the Father gave power to the Son, as by begetting Him He gave all things which He has in His substance to Him whom He begot of His substance."

Hilary of Poitiers: "And also in the mutual knowledge between the Father and the Son, He teaches us that there is nothing in the Son beyond what was in the Father, for it follows, And none knoweth the Son but the Father, nor does any man know the Father but the Son."

Chrysostom: "By this that He only knows the Father, He shows covertly that He is of one substance with the Father. As though He had said, What wonder if I be Lord of all, when I have somewhat yet greater, namely to know the Father and to be of the same substance with Him?"

Hilary of Poitiers: "For this mutual knowledge proclaims that they are of one substance, since He that should know the Son, should know the Father also in the Son, since all things were delivered to Him by the Father."

Chrysostom: "When He says, Neither does any know the Father but the Son, He does not mean that all men are altogether ignorant of Him; but that none knows Him with that knowledge wherewith He knows Him; which may also be said of the Son. For it is not said of some unknown God as Marcion declares."

Augustine: "And because their substance is inseparable, it is enough sometimes to name the Father, sometimes the Son, nor is it possible to separate from either His Spirit, who is especially called the Spirit of truth."

Jerome: "Let the heretic Eunomius therefore blush hereat who claims to himself such a knowledge of the Father and the Son, as they have one of anothera. But if he argues from what follows, and props up his madness by that, And he to whom the Son will reveal him, it is one thing to know what you know by equality with God, another to know it by His vouchsafing to reveal it."

Augustine: "The Father is revealed by the Son, that is, by His Word. For if the temporal and transitory word which we utter both shows itself, and what we wish to convey, how much more the Word of God by which all things were made, which so shows the Father as He is Father, because itself is the same and in the same manner as the Father."

Augustine: "When He said, None knoweth the Son but the Father, He did not add, And he to whom the Father will reveal the Son. But when He said, None knoweth the Father but the Son, He added, And he to whom the Son will reveal him. But this must not be so understood as though the Son could be known by none but by the Father only; while the Father may be known not only by the Son, but also by those to whom the Son shall reveal Him. But it is rather expressed thus, that we may understand that both the Father and the Son Himself are revealed by the Son, inasmuch as He is the light of our mind; and what is afterwards added, And he to whom the Son will reveal, is to be understood as spoken of the Son as well as the Father, and to refer to the whole of what had been said. For the Father declares Himself by His Word, but the Word declares not only that which is intended to be declared by it, but in declaring this declares itself."

Chrysostom: "If then He reveals the Father, He reveals Himself also. But the one he omits as a thing manifest, but mentions the other because there might be a doubt concerning it. Herein also He instructs us that He is so one with the Father, that it is not possible for any to come to the Father, but through the Son. For this had above all things given offence, that He seemed to be against God, and therefore He strove by all means to overthrow this notion."

Preceded by Matthew 11:26	Gospel of Matthew; Chapter 11	Succeeded by Matthew 11:28
