= Matthew 12:2 =

- ← 12:1 12:3 →
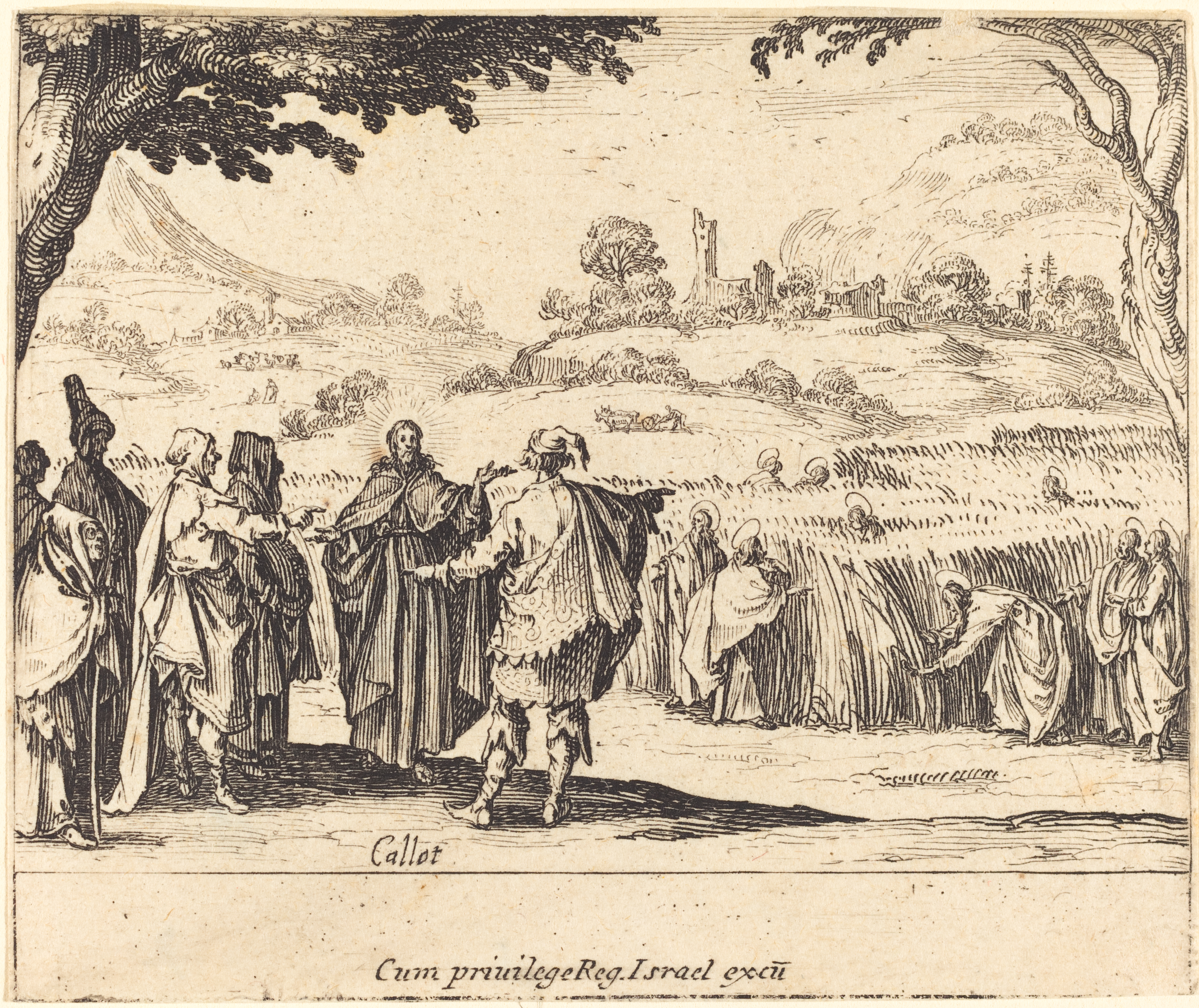
- "Jesus with the Pharisees" by Jacques Callot (1635).
- Book: Gospel of Matthew
- Christian Bible part: New Testament

Matthew 12:2 is the second verse in the twelfth chapter of the Gospel of Matthew in the New Testament.

== Content ==
In the original Greek according to Westcott-Hort, this verse is:

Οἱ δὲ Φαρισαῖοι ἰδόντες εἶπον αὐτῷ, Ἰδού, οἱ μαθηταί σου ποιοῦσιν ὃ οὐκ ἔξεστι ποιεῖν ἐν σαββάτῳ.

In the King James Version of the Bible the text reads:

But when the Pharisees saw it, they said unto him, Behold, thy disciples do that which is not lawful to do upon the sabbath day.

The New International Version translates the passage as:

When the Pharisees saw this, they said to him, "Look! Your disciples are doing what is unlawful on the Sabbath."

== Analysis ==
The Pharisees were annoyed that the disciples were doing servile work on the Sabbath, even though the act itself was allowed by Deut. 23:25. Spiritually it is said that the disciples were rubbing the ears, purifying them from the outer husks to reach the grain, by meditating on the Scriptures until they found "the inner marrow of love".

== Commentary from the Church Fathers ==
Chrysostom: " Here admire the disciples, who are so limited in their desires, that they have no care of the things of the body, but despise the support of the flesh; they are assailed by hunger, and yet they go not away from Christ; for had not they been hard pressed by hunger, they would not have done thus. What the Pharisees said to this is added, The Pharisees seeing it said unto Him, Behold, thy disciples do what is not lawful to do on the sabbath."

Augustine: " The Jews rather charged the Lord’s disciples with the breach of the sabbath than with theft; because it was commanded the people of Israel in the Law (Deut. 23:25.), that they should not lay hold of any as a thief in their fields, unless he sought to carry ought away with him; but if any touched only what he needed to eat, him they suffered to depart with impunity free."

Preceded by Matthew 12:1	Gospel of Matthew; Chapter 12	Succeeded by Matthew 12:3
