= Matthew 12:3 =

- ← 12:2 12:4 →
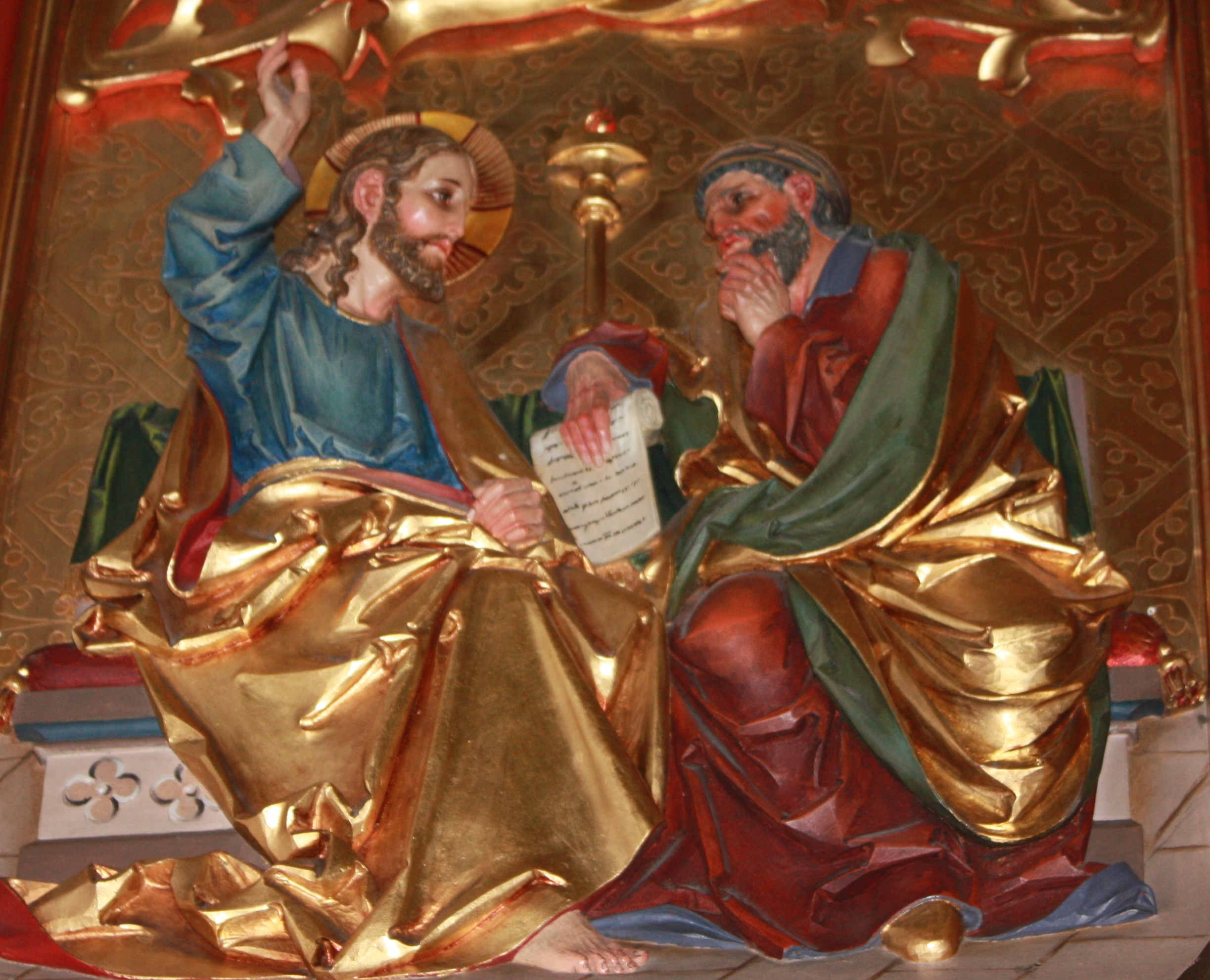
- "Jesus and the Pharisee" at Parish church Saint Vinzenz, Heiligenblut - Sacred Heart altar.
- Book: Gospel of Matthew
- Christian Bible part: New Testament

Matthew 12:3 is the third verse in the twelfth chapter of the Gospel of Matthew in the New Testament.

== Content ==
In the original Greek according to Westcott-Hort, this verse is:

Ὁ δὲ εἶπεν αὐτοῖς, Οὐκ ἀνέγνωτε τί ἐποίησε Δαβίδ, ὅτε ἐπείνασεν αὐτὸς καὶ οἱ μετ᾿ αὐτοῦ·

In the King James Version of the Bible the text reads:

But he said unto them, Have ye not read what David did, when he was an hungred, and they that were with him;

The New International Version translates the passage as:

He answered, "Haven't you read what David did when he and his companions were hungry?

== Analysis ==
This seems to be at variance with 1 Samuel 21, where it says, David was alone. However, it is resolved if one supposes he received the loaves and then brought them to his companions who were somewhere else. Jesus here seems to rebuke the Pharisees for their ignorance of the Scriptures, since they boasted of having great knowledge in it.

== Commentary from the Church Fathers ==
Jerome: "Observe, that the first Apostles of the Saviour broke the letter of the sabbath, contrary to the opinion of the Ebionites, who receive the other Apostles, but reject Paul as a transgressor of the Law. Then it proceeds to their excuse; But he said unto them, Have ye not read what David did, when he was an hungred? To refute the false accusation of the Pharisees, He calls to mind the ancient history, that David flying from Saul came to Nobba, and being entertained by Achimelech the Priest, asked for food; he having no common bread, gave him the consecrated loaves, which it was not lawful for any to eat, but the Priests only and Levites; esteeming it a better action to deliver men from the danger of famine than to offer sacrifice to God; for the preservation of man is a sacrifice acceptable to God. Thus then the Lord meets their objection, saying, If David be a holy man, and if you blame not the high-priest Achimelech, but consider their excuse for their transgression of the Law to be valid, and that was hunger; how do ye not approve in the Apostles the same plea which you approve in others? Though even here there is much difference. These rub ears of corn in their hands on the sabbath, those ate the Levitical bread, and over and above the solemn sabbath it was the season of new moon, during which when sought for at the banquet he fled from the royal palace."

Chrysostom: " To clear His disciples, He brings forward the instance of David, whose glory as a Prophet was great among the Jews. Yet they could not here answer that this was lawful for him, because he was a Prophet; for it was not Prophets, but Priests only who might eat. And the greater was he who did this, the greater is the defence of the disciples; yet though David was a Prophet, they that were with him were not."

Preceded by Matthew 12:2	Gospel of Matthew; Chapter 12	Succeeded by Matthew 12:4
