= Matthew 12:4 =

- ← 12:3 12:5 →
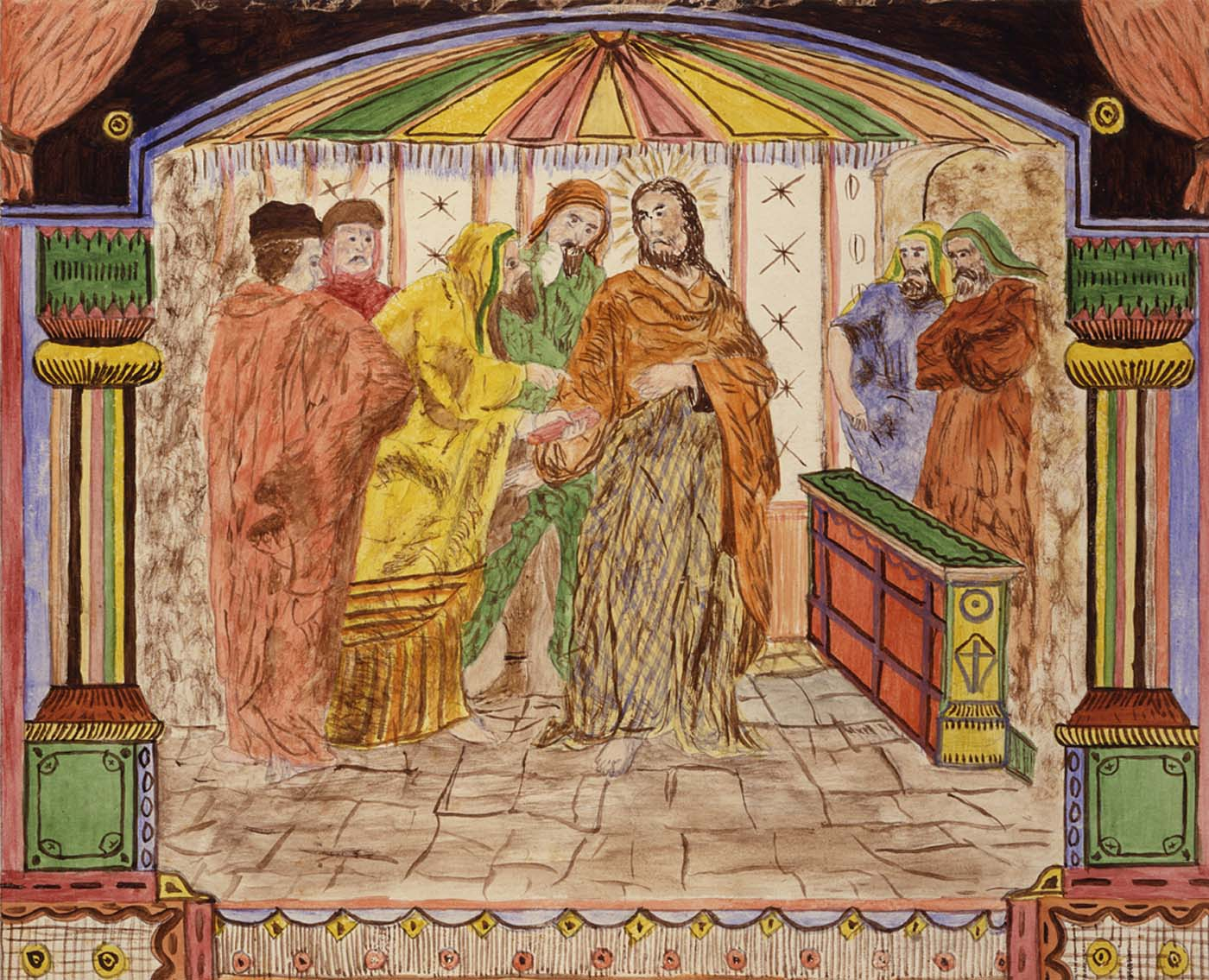
- "Christ and the Pharisees" by Lawrence W. Ladd (c. 1880).
- Book: Gospel of Matthew
- Christian Bible part: New Testament

Matthew 12:4 is the fourth verse in the twelfth chapter of the Gospel of Matthew in the New Testament.

== Content ==
In the original Greek according to Westcott-Hort, this verse is:

πῶς εἰσῆλθεν εἰς τὸν οἶκον τοῦ Θεοῦ, καὶ τοὺς ἄρτους τῆς προθέσεως ἔφαγεν, οὓς οὐκ ἐξὸν ἦν αὐτῷ φαγεῖν, οὐδὲ τοῖς μετ᾿ αὐτοῦ, εἰ μὴ τοῖς ἱερεῦσι μόνοις;

In the King James Version of the Bible the text reads:

How he entered into the house of God, and did eat the shewbread, which was not lawful for him to eat, neither for them which were with him, but only for the priests?

The New International Version translates the passage as:

He entered the house of God, and he and his companions ate the consecrated bread--which was not lawful for them to do, but only for the priests.

== Analysis ==
According to Lapide the show-bread were loaves which were always placed before the Holy of Holies. There were twelve of them to represent the twelve tribes of Israel, and these loaves, God commanded to be renewed every Sabbath. According to Lev. 24:8 these loaves were only eaten by the priests, and that only in the Tabernacle. However, in the case of David like the apostles, the requirements of people being fed surpassed the normal rules.

== Commentary from the Church Fathers ==
Jerome: " Observe that neither David nor his servants received the loaves of show-bread, before they had made answer that they were pure from women."

Chrysostom: " But some one will say, How is this instance applicable to the question in hand? For David did not transgress the sabbath. Herein is shown the wisdom of Christ, that He brings forward an instance stronger than the sabbath. For it is by no means the same thing to violate the sabbath, and to touch that sacred table, which is lawful for none. And again, He adds yet another answer, saying, Or have ye not read in the Law, that on the sabbath days the Priests in the temple profane the sabbath, and are blameless?"

Preceded by Matthew 12:3	Gospel of Matthew; Chapter 12	Succeeded by Matthew 12:5
