= Matthew 12:5 =

- ← 12:4 12:6 →
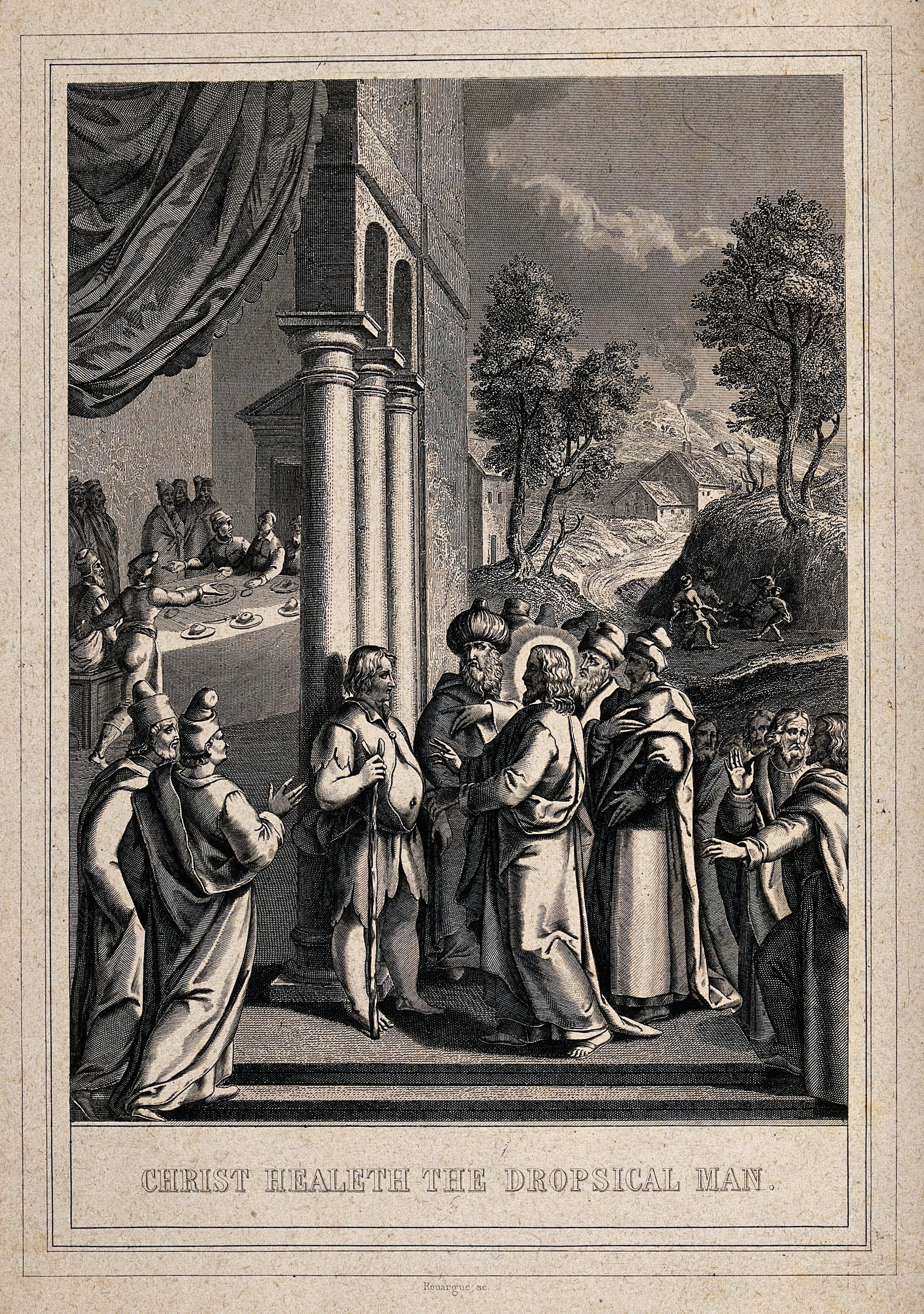
- "Dispute of Jesus and the Pharisees over healing on Sabbath Day", engraving by Emile Rouargue.
- Book: Gospel of Matthew
- Christian Bible part: New Testament

Matthew 12:5 is the fifth verse in the twelfth chapter of the Gospel of Matthew in the New Testament.

== Content ==
In the original Greek according to Westcott-Hort, this verse is:

Ἢ οὐκ ἀνέγνωτε ἐν τῷ νόμῳ, ὅτι τοῖς σάββασιν οἱ ἱερεῖς ἐν τῷ ἱερῷ τὸ σάββατον βεβηλοῦσι, καὶ ἀναίτιοί εἰσι;

In the King James Version of the Bible the text reads:

Or have ye not read in the law, how that on the sabbath days the priests in the temple profane the sabbath, and are blameless?

The New International Version translates the passage as:

Or haven't you read in the Law that on the Sabbath the priests in the temple desecrate the day and yet are innocent?

== Analysis ==
Jesus appears to refer to the slaying, skinning and cutting up of animals, in addition to the laying of wood, and kindling a fire, by which animals were burnt to the honour of God. Although in themselves, they are considered work, and would profane the Sabbath unless piety allowed it. So also as necessity from hunger excused David, the disciples are excused from a breach of the Sabbath because they follow the Messiah, and are so intent upon Jesus' teaching that they have forgotten to prepare food.

== Commentary from the Church Fathers ==
Jerome: " As though He had said, Ye bring complaints against my disciples, that on the sabbath they rub ears of corn in their hands, under stress of hunger, and ye yourselves profane the sabbath, slaying victims in the temple, killing bulls, burning holocausts on piles of wood; also, on the testimony of another Gospel (John 7:23.), ye circumcise infants on the sabbath; so that in keeping one law, ye break that concerning the sabbath. But the laws of God are never contrary one to another; wisely therefore, wherein His disciples might be accused of having transgressed them, He shows that therein they followed the examples of Achimelech and David; and this their pretended charge of breaking the sabbath He retorts truly, and not having the plea of necessity, upon those who had brought the accusation."

| Preceded by Matthew 12:4 | Gospel of Matthew; Chapter 12 | Succeeded by Matthew 12:6 |
