= Matthew 12:1 =

- ← 11:30 12:2 →
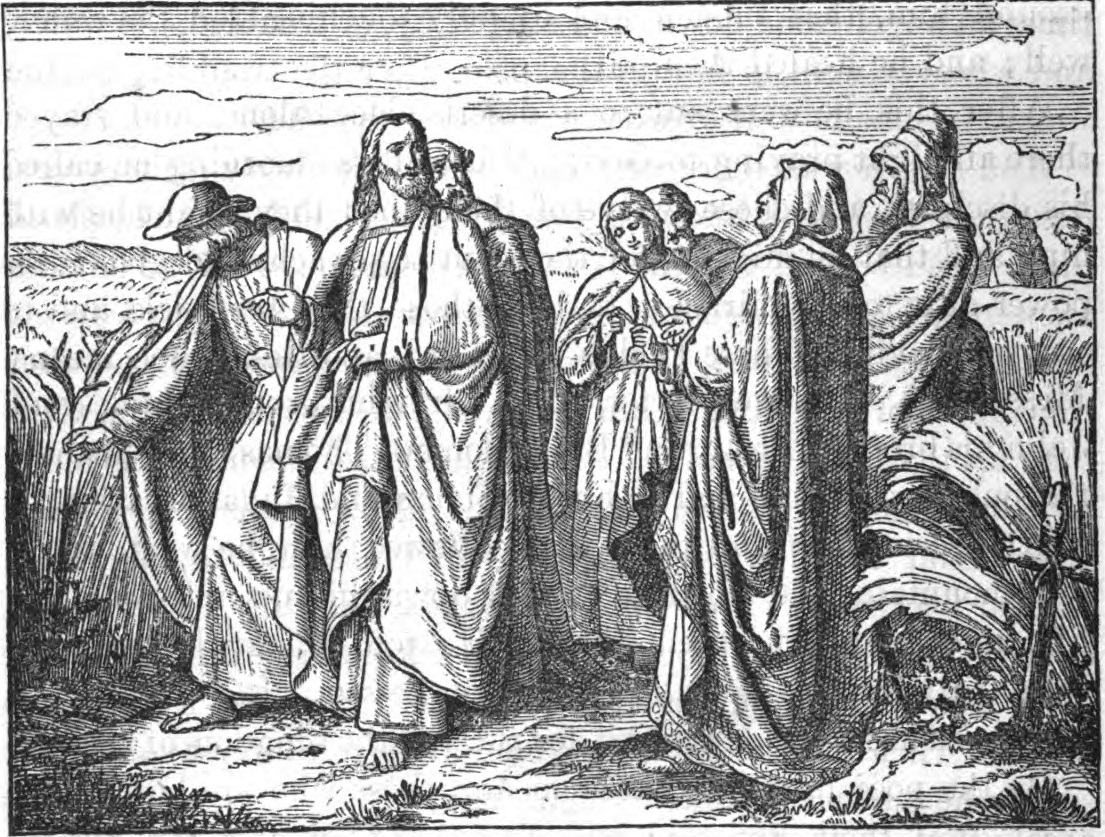
- "Jesus and his disciples walk through the corn". (1873).
- Book: Gospel of Matthew
- Christian Bible part: New Testament

Matthew 12:1 is the first verse in the twelfth chapter of the Gospel of Matthew in the New Testament of the Christian Bible.

== Content ==
In the original Greek according to Westcott-Hort, this verse is:

Ἐν ἐκείνῳ τῷ καιρῷ ἐπορεύθη ὁ Ἰησοῦς τοῖς σάββασι διὰ τῶν σπορίμων· οἱ δὲ μαθηταὶ αὐτοῦ ἐπείνασαν, καὶ ἤρξαντο τίλλειν στάχυας καὶ ἐσθίειν.

In the King James Version of the Bible, the text reads:

At that time Jesus went on the sabbath day through the corn; and his disciples were an hungred, and began to pluck the ears of corn, and to eat.

The New International Version translates the passage as:

At that time Jesus went through the grainfields on the Sabbath. His disciples were hungry and began to pick some heads of grain and eat them.

== Analysis ==
Mark 2:23 and Luke 6:1 also give the same account. In Matthew's account, the verse starts with "at that time", denoting that the occasion is not time-specific. However, it was the Sabbath which by Exodus 35:3 was to be kept free from work. The Greek word for the Sabbath day is plural (τοῖς σάββασι, tois sabbasi) which is a Hebrew expression meaning "one of the Sabbaths". The act of rubbing the wheat and eating from a neighbour's field was allowed by Deuteronomy 23:25. Cornelius a Lapide notes that the fact they rubbed the ears of corn in their hands and satisfied their hunger is a sign of an austere life.

== Commentary from the Church Fathers ==
Glossa Ordinaria: "Having related the preaching together with the miracles of one year before John’s enquiry, He passes to those of another year, namely after the death of John, when Jesus is already in all things spoken against, and hence it is said, At that time Jesus passed through the corn fields on the sabbath day."

Augustine: "This which here follows is related both by Mark and Luke, without any question of discrepancy; indeed they do not say, At that time, so that Matthew has here perhaps preserved the order of time, they that of their recollection; unless we take the words in a wider sense, At that time, that is, the time in which these many and divers things were done, whence we may conceive that all these things happened after the death of John. For he is believed to have been beheaded a little after he sent his disciples to Christ. So that when he says at that time, he may mean only an indefinite time."

Chrysostom: "Why then did He lead them through the corn fields on the sabbath, seeing He knew all things, unless He desired to break the sabbath? This he desired indeed, but not absolutely, therefore He broke it not without cause, but furnished a sufficient reason; so that He both caused the Law to cease, and yet offended not against it. Thus in order to soften the Jews, He here introduces a natural necessity; this is what is said, And his disciples being an hungred, began to pluck the ears of corn, and to eat. Although in things which are manifestly sinful, there can be no excuse, he who kills another cannot plead rage, nor he who commits adultery, lust, or any other cause; yet here saying that the disciples were hungry, He delivers them from all accusation."

Jerome: "As we read in another Evangelist, they had no opportunity of taking food because of the thronging of the multitude, and therefore they hungred as men. That they rub the ears of corn in their hands, and with them satisfy themselves, is a proof of an austere life, and of men who needed not prepared meats, but sought only simple food."

Preceded by Matthew 11:30	Gospel of Matthew; Chapter 12	Succeeded by Matthew 12:2
