= Matthew 12:9 =

- ← 12:8 12:10 →
- Book: Gospel of Matthew
- Christian Bible part: New Testament

Matthew 12:9 is the ninth verse in the twelfth chapter of the Gospel of Matthew in the New Testament.

== Content ==
In the original Greek according to Westcott-Hort, this verse is:

Καὶ μεταβὰς ἐκεῖθεν ἦλθεν εἰς τὴν συναγωγὴν αὐτῶν.

In the King James Version of the Bible the text reads:

And when he was departed thence, he went into their synagogue:

The New International Version translates the passage as:

Going on from that place, he went into their synagogue,

== Analysis ==
In Luke 6:6 it says, this happened on "another Sabbath". The Jews often on Sabbath days would assemble in their synagogues. The idea seems to be that Jesus is using the occasion of the Sabbath to perform miracles in order to refute the error of the Pharisees, about the observance of the Sabbath.

== Commentary from the Church Fathers ==
Jerome: " Because by fair instances He had vindicated His disciples from the charge of breaking the sabbath, the Pharisees seek to bring false accusation against Himself; whence it is said, And passing thence, he came into their synagogue."

Hilary of Poitiers: " For the things that had gone before were said and done in the open air, and after this He entered the synagogue."

Augustine: " It might have been supposed that the matter of the ears of corn, and this cure following, had been done on the same day, for it is mentioned to have been the sabbath day in both cases, had not Luke shown us that they were on different days. So that what Matthew says, And when he had passed thence, he came into their synagogue, is to be taken as that He did not enter into the synagogue till He had passed thence; but whether several days intervened or He went thither straight is not expressed in this Gospel, so that place is given to the relation of Luke, who tells of the healing of this kind of palsy on another sabbath."

Preceded by Matthew 12:8	Gospel of Matthew; Chapter 12	Succeeded by Matthew 12:10
