= Matthew 11:28 =

- ← 11:27 11:29 →
- Book: Gospel of Matthew
- Christian Bible part: New Testament

Matthew 11:28 is the 28th verse in the eleventh chapter of the Gospel of Matthew in the New Testament.

== Content ==
In the original Greek according to Westcott-Hort, this verse is:

Δεῦτε πρός με πάντες οἱ κοπιῶντες καὶ πεφορτισμένοι, κἀγὼ ἀναπαύσω ὑμᾶς.

In the King James Version of the Bible the text reads:

Come unto me, all ye that labour and are heavy laden, and I will give you rest.

The New International Version translates the passage as:

"Come to me, all you who are weary and burdened, and I will give you rest.

Instead of "give you rest", the Syriac has "I will place you in all quietness".

== Analysis ==
Here Christ invites everyone to "come" to him, in a spiritual sense. Those who labour (κοπιῶντες) points to those who suffer trouble and are burdened by 1) sins; 2) the law of Moses; 3) the troubles and temptations of this life.

== Commentary from the Church Fathers ==
John Chrysostom: "By what He had said, He brought His disciples to have a desire towards Him, showing them His unspeakable excellence; and now He invites them to Him, saying, Come unto me, all ye that labour and are heavy laden."

Augustine: "Whence do we all thus labour, but that we are mortal men, bearing vessels of clay which cause us much difficulty. But if the vessels of flesh are straitened, the regions of love will be enlarged. To what end then does He say, Come unto me, all ye that labour, but that ye should not labour?"

Hilary of Poitiers: "He calls to Him those that were labouring under the hardships of the Law, and those who are burdened with the sins of this world."

Jerome: "That the burden of sin is heavy the Prophet Zachariah bears witness, saying, that wickedness sitteth upon a talent of lead. (Zech. 5:7.) And the Psalmist fills it up, Thy iniquities are grown heavy upon me. (Ps. 38:4)"

== Uses ==
=== Music ===
The King James Version of this verse is cited as texts in the English-language oratorio "Messiah" by George Frideric Handel (HWV 56).

=== Catechetical ===
The Catholic Church's Dicastery for the Doctrine of the Faith uses the words Venite ad me from this verse as an incipit and invitation in its 2026 document, Venite ad me: Considerations on the Transmission of the Faith in an Epochal Change.

Preceded by Matthew 11:27	Gospel of Matthew; Chapter 11	Succeeded by Matthew 11:29
