= Johanne Luise Heiberg =

Danish actress

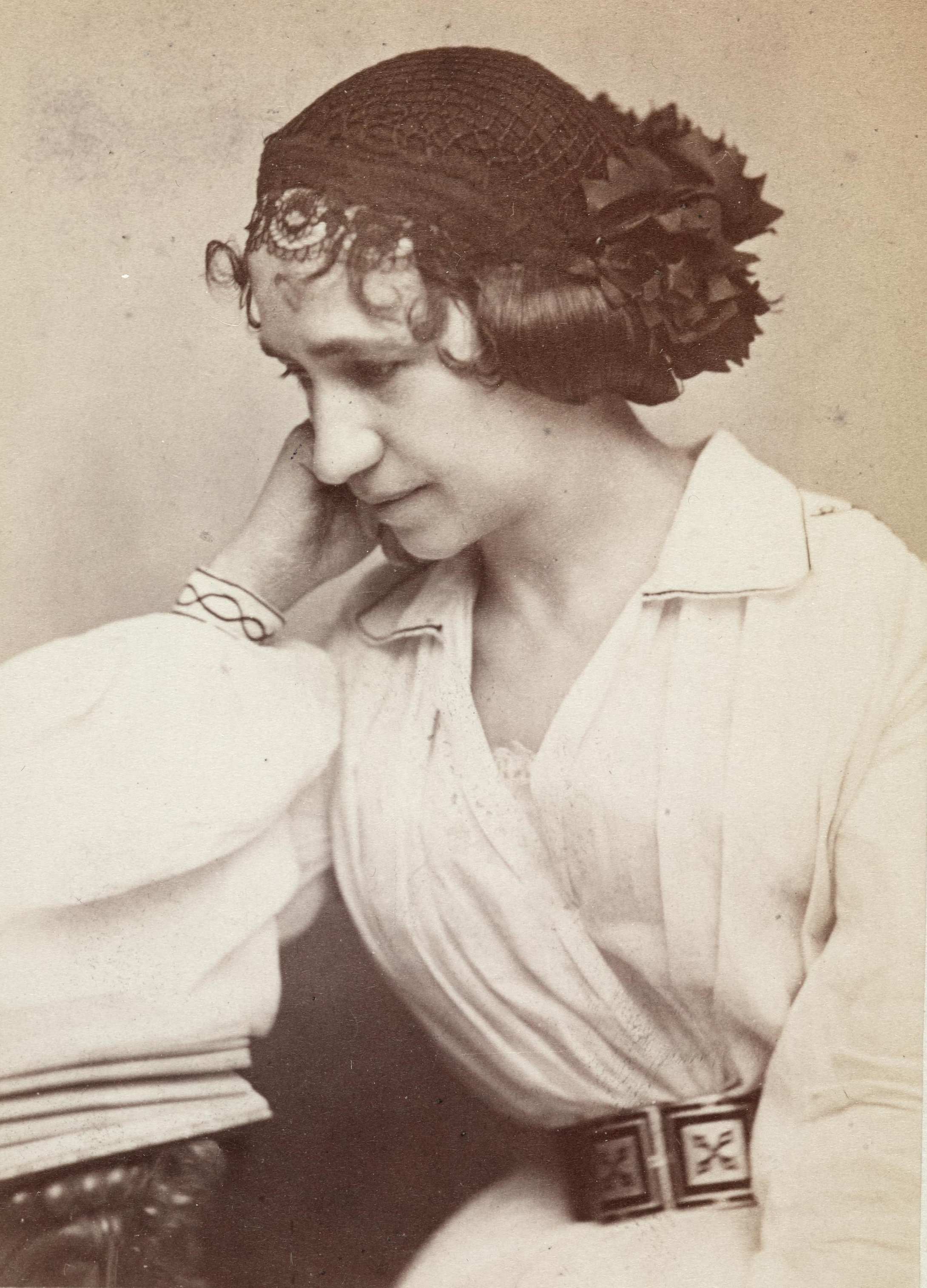
- Born: Johanne Luise Pätges; 22 November 1812; Copenhagen, Denmark
- Died: 21 December 1890 (aged 78); Copenhagen, Denmark
- Resting place: Cemetery of Holmen
- Occupations: Actress; Stage Director
- Years active: 1820–1874
- Spouse: Johan Ludvig Heiberg

Johanne Luise Heiberg (Danish pronunciation: [joˈhænə luˈiːsə ˈhɑjˌpɛɐ̯ˀ]; née Pätges; 22 November 1812 – 21 December 1890) was a Danish actress of the 19th century. She is most famous for her work at the Royal Theatre in Copenhagen, where she achieved great success. Though she was closely connected to the romantic tradition, Heiberg is still regarded as a key figure of Danish drama. She contributed to the growing public social and moral perception of Danish actors as artists and cultural personalities rather than simply performers.

== Early life ==
Heiberg was second youngest of nine children born to German emigrants. Her father Christian Heinrich Pätges was Roman Catholic, her mother Henriette (née Hartwig or Hirschborn) was Jewish. She showed artistic gifts very early and entered ballet school in 1820. With the help of patrons she was promoted to the rank of an actress and made a successful debut in 1827. From then on she was considered a leading actress of Danish theatre.

== Career ==
In 1831 she married the much older critic and dramatist Johan Ludvig Heiberg (1791–1860). The marriage raised her position. The Heibergs became a Copenhagen concept and their home was a cultural centre. In return the dual position of Heiberg as the leading lady of the theatre married to its main playwright also aroused much jealousy and accusations of favouritism. Her husband's time as the director of the Royal Theatre 1849-56 ended in an open conflict with her colleagues, and for a short period she even left the theatre. The death of her husband in 1860 and her age caused her retirement as an actress in 1864 though she worked as a stage director until 1874.

Heiberg played about 275 roles. Her exotic beauty combined with culture and elegance secured her position. Among her roles were Shakespeare characters including Viola in Twelfth Night and especially in French comedies and dramas. In Danish dramas she appeared in Holberg's and Oehlenschläger's plays, and especially in her husband's dramas; notably in Elves' Hill (Elverhøi) was a classic. Her strength was intelligence, controlled passion and wit, but she did not show the same talent for tragedy. She especially inspired Henrik Hertz (1797–1870) to write many of his main female roles for her. She also wrote some few vaudeville acts herself; the most popular being “A Sunday at Amager” (En Søndag paa Amager).

== Legacy ==
- Søren Kierkegaard wrote a tribute to her in 1847, The Crisis and a Crisis in the Life of an Actress (Krisen og en Krise i en Skuespillerindes Liv).
- Her 1891-92 autobiography, "A Life Relived in Memory" (Et Liv gjenoplevet i Erindringen) has often been criticised for its subjective descriptions but is still regarded as a pioneering work because of its interest regarding the process of acting.
- Her image was featured on the front of the Danish 1997 series 200-krone banknote. It went out of print in 2010.
- The drama Från regnormarnas liv (1981) by the Swedish author Per-Olov Enquist fictitiously deals with the relationship between Mrs Heiberg and Hans Christian Andersen.
- The Danish television drama 1864 (2014) features Heiberg as a confidant of the Council President Ditlev Gothard Monrad (1811–1887).

== Other sources ==
- Henning Fenger (1971) The Heibergs (Twayne Publishers; edited and translated by Frederick J. Marker)
