= The Crisis and a Crisis in the Life of an Actress =

Book by Søren Kierkegaard

The Crisis and a Crisis in the Life of an Actress (Danish: Krisen og en Krise i en Skuespillerindes Liv) was a series of articles written by the Danish philosopher Søren Kierkegaard in 1847 and published in the Danish newspaper Fædrelandet (The Fatherland) in 1848 under the pseudonym Inter et Inter.

The actress in question is Johanne Luise Heiberg, the wife of Johan Ludvig Heiberg, although she is not mentioned by name in the articles. Johanne Luise was a popular and leading lady of the Danish stage at the time and she had written an autobiographical reflection of her life, in which she praised Kierkegaard for his insight into her art.

The Crisis discusses the life of a young actress' metamorphosis into a mature refined woman. When the actress first starts out in her career she is admired for her beauty, youthfulness, and novelty. Years later, although these accidental attributes are fading, she is still a talented actress, and she now possesses the experience and reflection needed for a truly aesthetic performance. The theme revolves around the transitions from the aesthetic stage of life to the ethical stage of life, and how a person in the ethical stage of life is still capable of aesthetic enjoyment.

Although Kierkegaard was writing philosophical-religious works at this time, such as Works of Love, Kierkegaard wrote The Crisis to show that a religious author can still write and appreciate aesthetic concerns. "The world is indeed so weak that, when it believes that a person who proclaims the religious is incapable of the aesthetic, it overlooks the religious".
