= Healing the man with a withered hand =

Miracle carried out by Jesus according to the Bible

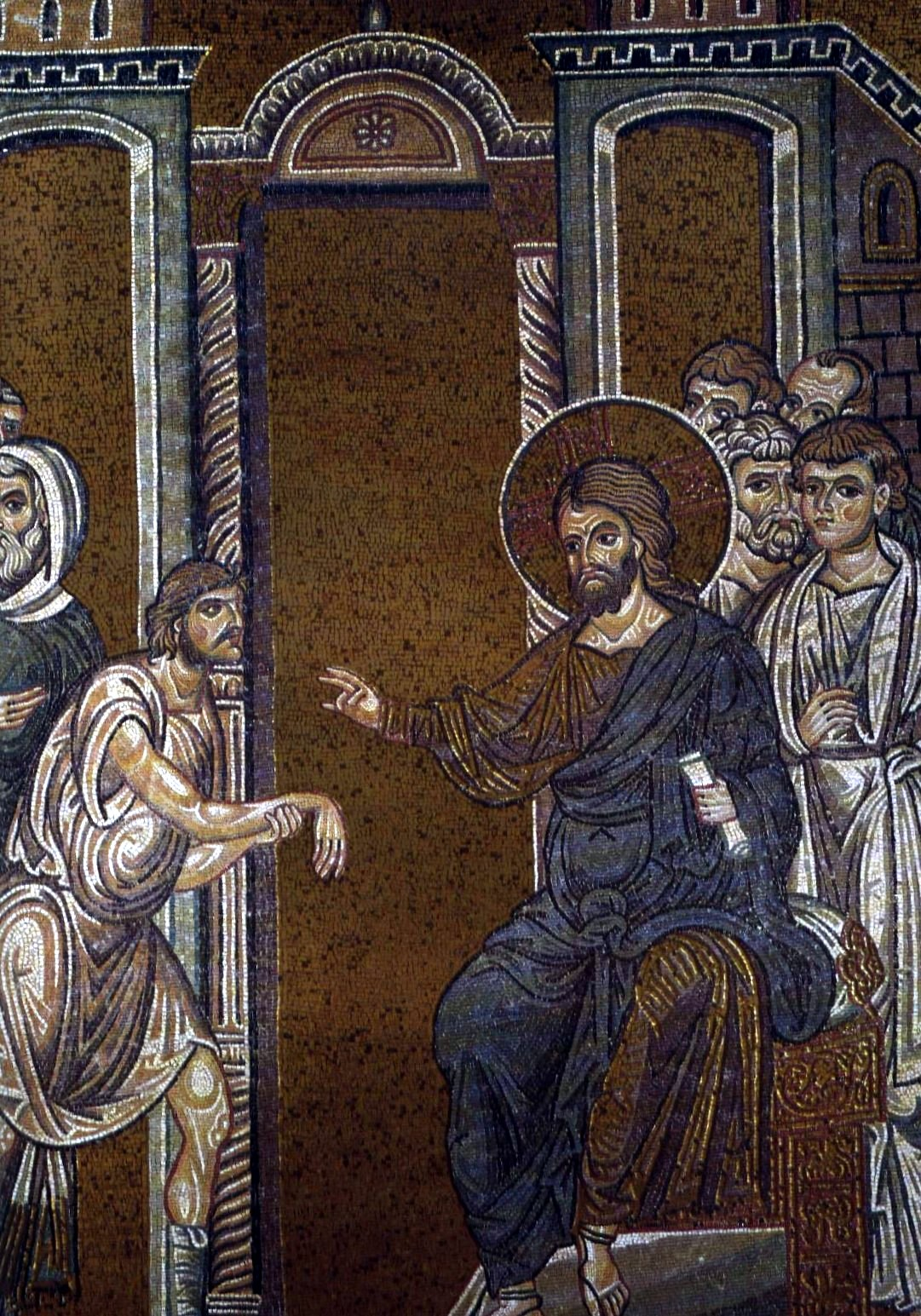
Christ healing the man with a withered hand, Byzantine mosaic

Jesus heals a man with a withered hand on the Sabbath in one of his miracles recounted in the Gospels, namely in Matthew 12:9-13, Mark 3:1-6, and Luke 6:6-11.

== Biblical accounts ==
On a Sabbath, in Luke, "another Sabbath", when Jesus went into the synagogue, the Pharisees and the teachers of the law were looking for a reason to accuse him, so they watched him closely to see if he would heal on the Sabbath and (in Matthew's Gospel) they asked him: "Is it lawful to heal on the Sabbath?" In Mark and Luke it is Jesus who asks whether it is lawful to heal on the Sabbath. By way of reply in the Gospel of Matthew, appealing to "the human sentiment of his hearers",

He said to them, "If any of you has a sheep and it falls into a pit on the Sabbath, will you not take hold of it and lift it out? How much more valuable is a man than a sheep! Therefore it is lawful to do good on the Sabbath." Then he said to the man, "Stretch out your hand." So he stretched it out and it was completely restored, just as sound as the other.

According to Mark's account, the Pharisees then went out and began to plot with the Herodians, their "natural enemies", how they might kill Jesus.

== Tradition ==
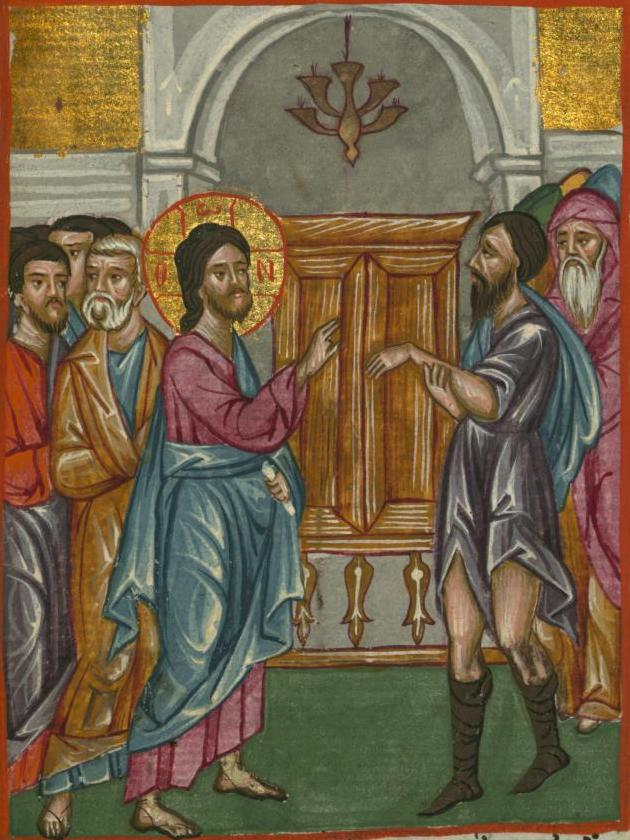
Jesus Heals the Man with a Withered Hand by Ilyas Basim Khuri Bazzi Rahib (1684)

According to St. Jerome, in the Gospel which the Nazareni and Ebionites use, which was written in Hebrew and according to Jerome was thought by many to be the original text of the Gospel of Matthew, the man with the withered hand, was a mason.

And he besought Jesus saying, "I was a mason, gaining my livelihood by my hands: I beseech Thee, O Jesus, that Thou wouldst restore me to soundness, that I may not shamefully beg my bread."

== Commentary ==
Archbishop John McEvilly notes that in the question of Jesus, He implies that "to omit saving our brethren, when in great danger, is the same as destroying them; that such omission was doing evil." They could not answer him (Mark 3:4) because "it could not be denied that it was lawful to do good, and also that it was lawful, 'to save life'".

Venerable Bede gives an allegorical commentary on the miracle writing, "Adam plucking the forbidden fruit, dried up the hand of the human race, that is, he deprived man of the power to be fruitful in good works. Christ, however, restored that power by stretching forth His hands on the cross."

== Arts ==
This miracle is the subject of the spoken sermon portion of composer John Adams' 1973 work, "Christian Zeal and Activity".

== In Media ==
- In the 2019-present Angel Studios TV series, The Chosen, Season 2 episode 6, Unlawful, this scene is quoted and portrayed accurately from the Bible's New Testament, with Jonathan Roumie providing the portrayal of Jesus.

== See also ==
- Life of Jesus in the New Testament
- Ministry of Jesus
- Miracles of Jesus
- Parables of Jesus
