= Matthew 12:43–45 =

Matthew 12:43-45
- ← 12:42 12:46 →
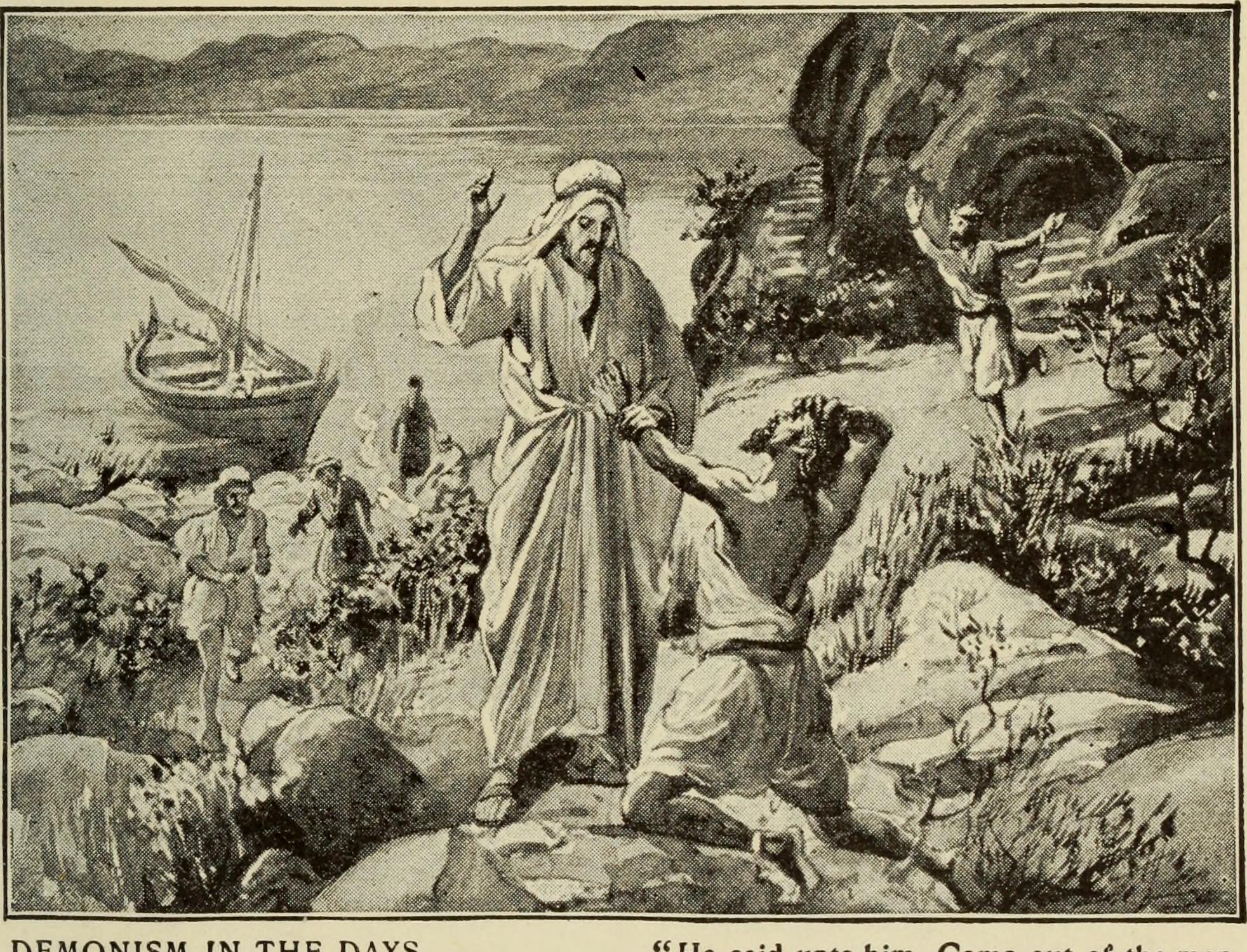
- "Jesus cast out unclean spirits". Illustration from Our day in the light of prophecy and providence (1921)
- Book: Gospel of Matthew
- Christian Bible part: New Testament

Matthew 12:43-45 is a passage comprising the 43rd to 45th verses in the twelfth chapter of the Gospel of Matthew in the New Testament.

== Content ==
In the original Greek according to Westcott-Hort, these verses are:

43:Ὅταν δὲ τὸ ἀκάθαρτον πνεῦμα ἐξέλθῃ ἀπὸ τοῦ ἀνθρώπου, διέρχεται δι᾿ ἀνύδρων τόπων, ζητοῦν ἀνάπαυσιν, καὶ οὐχ εὑρίσκει.
44:Τότε λέγει, Ἐπιστρέψω εἰς τὸν οἶκόν μου ὅθεν ἐξῆλθον. Καὶ ἐλθὸν εὑρίσκει σχολάζοντα, σεσαρωμένον καὶ κεκοσμημένον.
45:Τότε πορεύεται καὶ παραλαμβάνει μεθ᾿ ἑαυτοῦ ἑπτὰ ἕτερα πνεύματα πονηρότερα ἑαυτοῦ, καὶ εἰσελθόντα κατοικεῖ ἐκεῖ· καὶ γίνεται τὰ ἔσχατα τοῦ ἀνθρώπου ἐκείνου χείρονα τῶν πρώτων. Οὕτως ἔσται καὶ τῇ γενεᾷ ταύτῃ τῇ πονηρᾷ.

In the King James Version of the Bible the text reads:

43:When the unclean spirit is gone out of a man, he walketh through dry places, seeking rest, and findeth none.
44:Then he saith, I will return into my house from whence I came out; and when he is come, he findeth it empty, swept, and garnished.
45:Then goeth he, and taketh with himself seven other spirits more wicked than himself, and they enter in and dwell there: and the last state of that man is worse than the first. Even so shall it be also unto this wicked generation.

The New International Version translates the passage as:

43:"When an evil spirit comes out of a man, it goes through arid places seeking rest and does not find it.
44:Then it says, 'I will return to the house I left.' When it arrives, it finds the house unoccupied, swept clean and put in order.
45:Then it goes and takes with it seven other spirits more wicked than itself, and they go in and live there. And the final condition of that man is worse than the first. That is how it will be with this wicked generation."

== Analysis ==
Christ continues to expound on the subject of demoniacal possession, having just healed a possessed man. Lapide writes that the Scribes were spiritually possessed, and that their unclean spirit was driven out by the law of God, from the Jews, who were the people of God, among whom God dwelt, and manifested Himself by prophecies and miracles. This evil wandered through desert places, but when they reject God's grace which Christ offers that spirit returns to them and causes them to blaspheme Christ.

It is said that the house is the soul, which is empty, since it is lacking God, and devoid of His grace. It is swept clean of all virtue, piety and goodness.

Notably, in Tobit 8 there is an example of the devil Asmodeus being bound by Raphael and sent to a desert place, that he may not injure others.

== Commentary from the Church Fathers ==
Chrysostom: "The Lord had said to the Jews, The men of Nineveh shall rise in the judgment with this generation, and shall condemn it; that they should not therefore be careless, He tells them that not only in the world to come but here also they should suffer grievous things; setting forth in a sort of riddle the punishment that should fall upon them; whence He says, When the unclean spirit has gone out of a man."

Jerome: "Some suppose that this place is spoken of heretics, because the unclean spirit who dwelt in them before when they were Gentiles, is cast out before the confession of the true faith; when after they went over to heresy, and garnished their house with feigned virtues, then it is that the Devil, having taken to him other seven evil spirits, returns and dwells in them; and their last state becomes worse than their first. And indeed heretics are in a much worse condition than the Gentiles; for in the heretics was a hope of faith, in the Gentiles a war of discord. Yet though this exposition has a plausibility and a show of learning, I am doubtful of its truth. For by the concluding words of this, whether it be parable or example, Titus shall it he to this evil generation, we are compelled to refer it, not to heretics, or to men in general, but to the Jewish people. So the context of the passage may not shift about loosely and vaguely, and be like unmeaning speeches, but may be consistent with itself from first to last. The unclean spirit then went out from the Jews when they received the Law; and being cast out of the Jews, he walked through the wilderness of the Gentiles; as it follows, He walketh through dry places seeking rest."

Saint Remigius: "He calls the hearts of the Gentiles, dry places, as lacking all the moisture of wholesome waters, that is of the holy Scriptures, and of spiritual gifts, and strangers to the pouring in of the Holy Spirit."

Rabanus Maurus: "Or, the dry places are the hearts of the faithful, which after they have been purged from the weakness of loose thoughts, the crafty lier-in-wait tries if by any means he may fix his footsteps there; but flying from the chaste spirit, the Devil finds no resting-place to his mind but in the heart of the wicked; as it follows, and findeth none."

Saint Remigius: "The Devil supposed he should have rest for ever among the Gentiles, but it is added, and findeth none, because when the Son of God appeared in the mystery of His incarnation, the Gentiles believed."

Jerome: "And when they believed on the Lord, the Devil, finding no place among the nations, said, I will return into my house whence I came out; I have the Jews from whom I formerly departed. And when he is come, he findeth it empty, swept, and garnished. For the temple of the Jews was empty, and had not Christ to dwell therein, He having said, Arise, let us go hence. (John 14:31) Seeing then they had not the protection of Angels, and were burdened with the useless observances of the Law, and the traditions of the Pharisees, the Devil returns to his former dwelling, and, taking to him seven other dæmons, inhabits it as before. And the last state of that nation is worse than the first, for they are now possessed by a larger number of dæmons in blaspheming Jesus Christ in their synagogues, than they were possessed with in Egypt before they had knowledge of the Law; for it is one thing to have no belief that He should come, another not to receive Him when He is come. A number seven-fold is joined with the Devil, either because of the sabbath, or from the number of the Holy Spirit; (Is. 11:2) that as in Isaiah upon the bud which comes from the root of Jesse, seven spirits of virtues are related to have descended; so on the other hand an equal number of vices should be poured forth upon the Devil. Beautifully then are seven spirits said to be taken to him, either because of the breaking of the sabbath, or because of the heinous sins which are contrary to the seven gifts of the Holy Spirit."

Chrysostom: "Or, herein He may be showing forth their punishment. As when dæmoniacs have been loosed from their infirmity, if they after become remiss, they draw upon themselves more grievous illusions, so shall it be among you—before ye were possessed by a dæmons, when you worshipped idols, and slew your sons to dæmon yet I forsook you not, but cast out that dæmon by the Prophets, and afterwards came Myself seeking to purify you altogether. Since then ye would not hearken to me, but have fallen into more heinous crime, (as it is greater wickedness to slay Christ than to slay the Prophets,) therefore ye shall suffer more heavy calamities. For what befel them under Vespasian and Titus, were much more grievous than they had suffered in Egypt, in Babylon, and under Antiochus. And this indeed is not all He shows concerning them, but also that since they were destitute of every virtue, they were more fit for the habitation of dæmons than before. It is reasonable to suppose that these things were said not to them only, but also to us. If after being enlightened and delivered from our former evils, we are again possessed by the same wickedness, the punishment of these latter sins will be greater than of the first; as Christ spake to the paralytic, Behold, thou art made whole, sin not, lest a worse thing come upon thee. (John 5:14)"

Rabanus Maurus: "For when any one is converted to the faith, the Devil is cast out of him in Baptism, who driven thence wanders up and down through the dry places, that is, the hearts of the faithful."

Gregory the Great: " The dry places where no water is are the hearts of the righteous, which by the power of discipline are dried from all humours of carnal lust. The wet places are the minds of worldly men, which the humour of carnal lust fills, and makes watery; in such the Devil imprints his footsteps the more deeply, inasmuch as in his wanderings he comes down upon such hearts as upon low and marshy ground."

Rabanus Maurus: "And returning to his house whence he had gone out, he findeth it empty, of good works through slothfulness, swept, that is, of its old vices by Baptism, and garnished with feigned virtues through hypocrisy."

Augustine: " So that in these words the Lord signifies that some shall so believe, as not to have strength for the work of continence, and shall return to the world. He taketh unto him other seven, is to be understood that when any has fallen from righteousness, he shall also have hypocrisy. For the lust of the flesh being cast out of its wonted works by penitence, when it finds not any delights in which it may rest, returns the more greedily, and again takes possession of the soul, if carelessness has ensued, and there has not been introduced as the dweller in the cleansed abode the word of God in sound doctrine. And as he will not only have the seven vices which are the contraries of the spiritual virtues, but will hypocritically feign that he has the virtues, therefore his old lust, taking to itself seven other worse, that is, this seven-fold hypocrisy, returns to him so as to make the last state of that man worse than the former."

Gregory the Great: " For it often happens that the soul in the commencement of its progress is lifted up, and prides itself on its virtues, that it opens an entrance to the adversary who is raging against it, and who shows himself the more violent in breaking into it, by how much he was grieved at being cast out, though but for a short space."

Preceded by Matthew 12:42	Gospel of Matthew; Chapter 12	Succeeded by Matthew 12:46
