= Matthew 12:46 =

- ← 12:45 12:47 →
- Book: Gospel of Matthew
- Christian Bible part: New Testament

Matthew 12:46 is the 46th verse in the twelfth chapter of the Gospel of Matthew in the New Testament.

== Content ==
In the original Greek according to Westcott-Hort, this verse is:

Ἔτι δὲ αὐτοῦ λαλοῦντος τοῖς ὄχλοις, ἰδού, ἡ μήτηρ καὶ οἱ ἀδελφοὶ αὐτοῦ εἱστήκεισαν ἔξω, ζητοῦντες αὐτῷ λαλῆσαι.

In the King James Version of the Bible, the text reads:

While he yet talked to the people, behold, his mother and his brethren stood without, desiring to speak with him.

The New International Version translates the passage as:

While Jesus was still talking to the crowd, his mother and brothers stood outside, wanting to speak to him.

== Analysis ==
There has been much debate throughout the history of the church as to who the brothers of Jesus were, and whether they were children of Mary. However, the ancient churches (Catholic and Orthodox) maintain that Mary remained a virgin after giving birth to Jesus and that the word "brothers" (Greek: ἀδελφοὶ, adelphoi) is used here to refer to cousins of Jesus. The principal classical work on this perspective is St. Jerome's, "Against Helvidius". The contrary view, that "these words would naturally be understood to refer to the brothers according to the flesh, sons of Joseph and Mary, born after Jesus" is argued by Heinrich Meyer to be "beyond all doubt".

Joseph Benson suggests that they were obliged to wait outside as they could not come nearer "because of the multitude that sat about him".

The motive for the visit of the brothers appears in Mark's and John's Gospels, "that they might take Him with them, and bring Him to Nazareth. For they said that He was beside Himself" (Mark 3:21). "For neither did His brothers believe in Him" (John 7:5). Irish Archbishop John McEvilly also suggests that Mary wanted to give Jesus "some respite from His labours".

== Commentary from the Church Fathers ==
Hilary of Poitiers: "Because He had spoken all the aforesaid things in the power of His Father’s majesty, therefore the Evangelist proceeds to tell what answer He made to one that told Him that His mother and His brethren waited for Him without; While he yet spake unto the people, his mother and his brethren stood without desiring to see him."

Augustine: "We are to understand without doubt that this happened close upon the foregoing; for he begins to tell it with the words, And while he yet spake. What can that yet mean but that it was at the very time He spake the foregoing things? Mark also follows up that which He had said concerning blasphemy against the Holy Ghost, by saying, And there came his mother and his brethren. (Mark 3:31) Luke has not observed the order of action here, but has placed this earlier as he happened to recollect it."

Jerome: "From this is taken one of Helvidius’s propositions, on the ground that mention is made in the Gospel of the brethren of the Lord. How, says he, are they called brethren of the Lord, if they were not his brethren? But now it should be known that in divine Scripture men are said to be brethren in four different ways, by nature, by nation, by kindred, and by affection. By nature, as Esau and Jacob. By nation, as all Jews are called brethren, as in Deuteronomy, Thou shalt not set over thee a foreigner who is not thy brother. (Deuteronomy 17:15) They are called brethren by kindred who are of one family, as in Genesis, Abraham said unto Lot, Let there not be strife between thee and me, for we are brethren. (Genesis 13:8) Also men are called brethren by affection, which is of two kinds, special and general. Special, as all Christians are called brethren, as the Saviour says, Go tell my brethren. General, inasmuch as all men are born of one father, we are bound together by a tie of consanguinity, as in that, Say unto them that hate you, Ye are our brethren. (Is. 66:5 sec. LXX (Septuagint).) I ask then, after which manner these are called the Lord’s brethren in the Gospel? According to nature? But Scripture saith not, neither calling them sons of Mary nor of Joseph. By nation? But it is absurd that some few out of all the Jews should be called brethren, seeing that all the Jews who were there might have thus been called brethren. By affection, either of a human sort, or of the Spirit? If that be true, yet how were they more His brethren than the Apostles, whom He instructed in the inmost mysteries. Or if because they were men, and all men are brethren, it was foolish to say of them in particular, Behold, thy brethren seek thee. It only remains then that they should be His brethren by kindred, not by affection, not by privilege of nation, not by nature."

Jerome: "But some suspect the brethren of the Lord to be sons of Joseph by another wife, following the idle fancies of apocryphal writers, who have coined a certain woman called Esca. (Note: Esca or Escha, also known as Melcha, is referred to in The Infancy Story of Thomas.) But we understand by the brethren of the Lord, not the sons of Joseph, but cousins of the Saviour, sons of a sister of Mary, an aunt of Our Lord, who is said to be the mother of James the Less, and Joseph, and Jude, whom in another place of the Gospel we find called the brethren of the Lord. (Mark 6:3) And that cousins are called brethren, appears from every part of Scripture."

Chrysostom: "But mark the loftiness of His brethren; (Note: The text of S. Chrys. has ορα γουν και αυτης και εκεινων την απονοιαν.) when they should have come in and heartened with the crowd, or if they would not this, to have waited the end of His speech, and then to have approached Him - they on the contrary call Him out to them, and do this before the multitude, therein showing their superabundant love of honour, and also, that with all authority they lay their commands upon Christ. This the Evangelist covertly hints when he says, While he yet spake; as much as to say, Was there no other time? But what did they seek to say? Was it aught of the dogmas of truth? then should they have brought it forth before all, that all might profit thereby. But if of other things that concerned themselves alone, they should not have called Him in such haste, whence it is plain that they did this out of vain glory."

Augustine: "But whatever may be decided concerning these brethren, yet concerning the holy Virgin Mary, (for the honour of Christ,) when sin in her is in question, I would not have it brought into doubt. For from this only we might know that more abundant grace was conferred upon her that she should overcome sin on all sides, because she merited to conceive and bring forth Him Who it is clear had no sin. It follows; Then said one unto him, Behold, thy mother and thy brethren stand without seeking thee."

== Notes ==
Preceded by Matthew 12:45	Gospel of Matthew; Chapter 12	Succeeded by Matthew 12:47
