= Matthew 12:25 =

- ← 12:24 12:26 →
- Book: Gospel of Matthew
- Christian Bible part: New Testament

Matthew 12:25 is the 25th verse in the twelfth chapter of the Gospel of Matthew in the New Testament.

== Content ==
In the original Greek according to Westcott-Hort, this verse is:

Εἰδὼς δὲ ὁ Ἰησοῦς τὰς ἐνθυμήσεις αὐτῶν εἶπεν αὐτοῖς, Πᾶσα βασιλεία μερισθεῖσα καθ᾿ ἑαυτῆς ἐρημοῦται· καὶ πᾶσα πόλις ἢ οἰκία μερισθεῖσα καθ᾿ ἑαυτῆς οὐ σταθήσεται.

In the King James Version of the Bible the text reads:

And Jesus knew their thoughts, and said unto them, Every kingdom divided against itself is brought to desolation; and every city or house divided against itself shall not stand:

The New International Version translates the passage as:

Jesus knew their thoughts and said to them, "Every kingdom divided against itself will be ruined, and every city or household divided against itself will not stand".

== Analysis ==
"Jesus knew their thoughts... " seems to imply that Jesus knew the motives and inner mind of the Pharisees from which their envious thoughts proceeded. Jesus here appears to speak mildly with them, "said to them". The reasoning is that any family, household or kingdom if caught up in internal strife must soon fall apart.

== Commentary from the Church Fathers ==
Jerome: "The Pharisees ascribed the works of God to the Prince of the dæmons; and the Lord makes answer not to what they said, but to what they thought, that even thus they might be compelled to believe His power, Who saw the secrets of the heart; Jesus, knowing their thoughts, said unto them."

Chrysostom: "Above they had accused Christ of having cast out dæmons by Beelzebub; but then He did not reprove them, suffering them, if they would, to acknowledge Him from further miracles, and to learn His greatness from His doctrine. But because they continued to maintain the same things, He now rebukes them, although their accusation had been very unreasonable. But jealousy recks not what it says, so that only it say somewhat. Yet does not Christ condemn them, but answers with a gracious mildness, teaching us to be gentle to our enemies, and not to be troubled, even though they should speak such things against us, as we neither acknowledge in us, nor have any reasonableness in themselves. Therein also He proves that the things which they had said against Him were false, for it is not of one having a dæmon to show such mercy, and to know the thoughts. Moreover, because this their accusation was very unreasonable, and they feared the multitude, they did not dare to proclaim it openly, but kept it in their thoughts; wherefore he says, Knowing their thoughts. He does not repeat their thoughts in His answer, not to divulge their wickedness; but He brings forward an answer; it was His object to do good to the sinners, not to proclaim their sin. He does not answer them out of the Scriptures, because they would not hearken to Him as they explained them differently, but He refutes them from common opinions. For assaults from without are not so destructive as quarrels within; and this is so in bodies and in all other things. But in the meanwhile He draws instances from matters more known, saying, Every kingdom divided against itself shall be brought to desolation; for there is nothing on earth more powerful than a kingdom, and yet that is destroyed by contention. What then must we say concerning a city or a family, that whether it be great or small, it is destroyed when it is at discord within itself."

Hilary of Poitiers: "For a city or family is analogous to a kingdom, as it follows, And every city or house divided against itself shall not stand."

Jerome: "For as small things grow by concord, so the greatest fall to pieces through dissensions."

Preceded by Matthew 12:24	Gospel of Matthew; Chapter 12	Succeeded by Matthew 12:26
