= Matthew 12:41 =

- ← 12:40 12:42 →
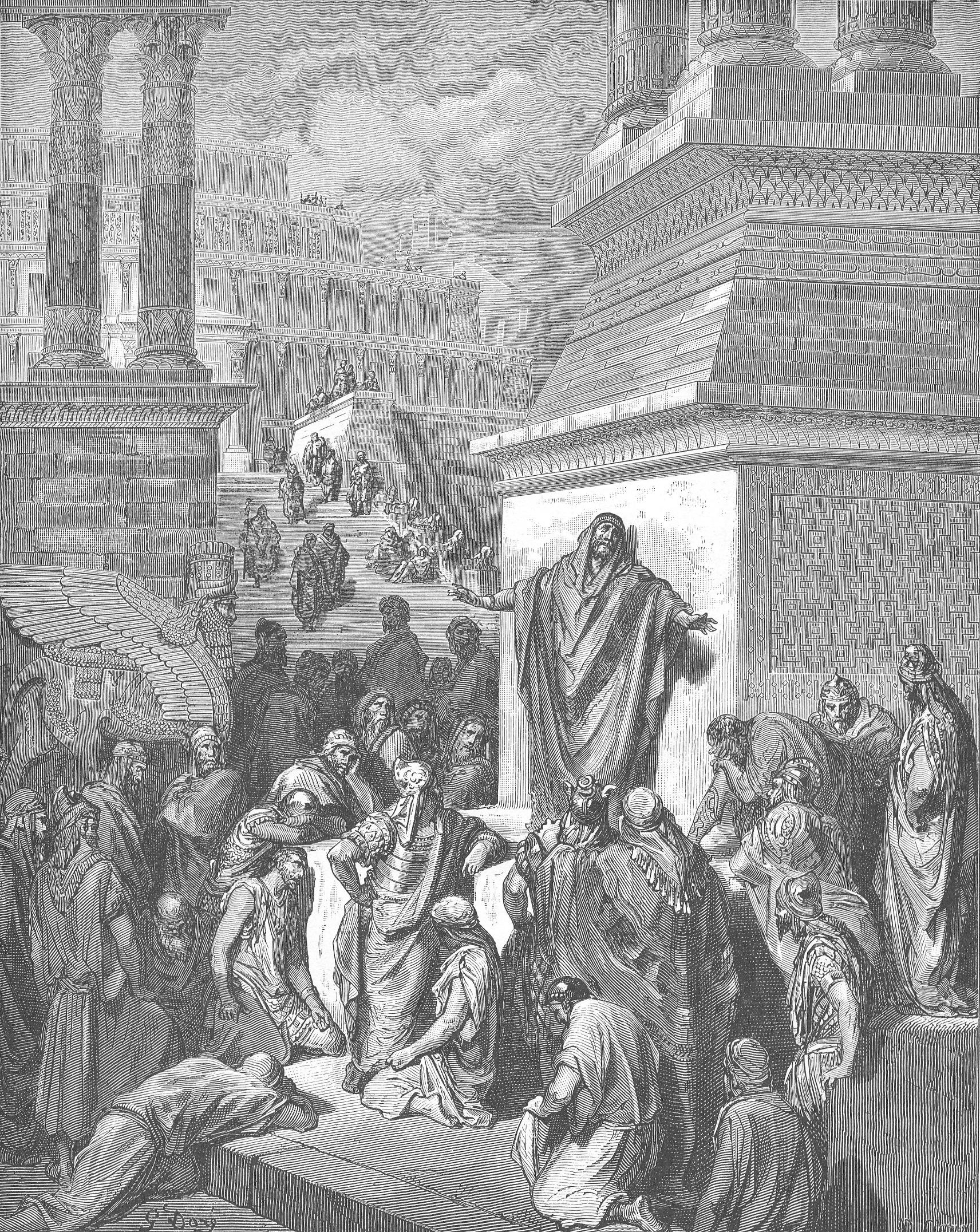
- Jonah Preaching to the Ninevites (1866) by Gustave Doré
- Book: Gospel of Matthew
- Christian Bible part: New Testament

Matthew 12:41 is the 41st verse in the twelfth chapter of the Gospel of Matthew in the New Testament.

== Content ==
In the original Greek according to Westcott-Hort, this verse reads:

Ἄνδρες Νινευῖται ἀναστήσονται ἐν τῇ κρίσει μετὰ τῆς γενεᾶς ταύτης καὶ κατακρινοῦσιν αὐτήν· ὅτι μετενόησαν εἰς τὸ κήρυγμα Ἰωνᾶ· καὶ ἰδού, πλεῖον Ἰωνᾶ ὧδε.

In the King James Version of the Bible the text reads:

The men of Nineveh shall rise in judgment with this generation, and shall condemn it: because they repented at the preaching of Jonas; and, behold, a greater than Jonas is here.

The New International Version translates the passage as:

The men of Nineveh will stand up at the judgment with this generation and condemn it; for they repented at the preaching of Jonah, and now one greater than Jonah is here.

== Analysis ==
The story of the Ninevites and king Sardanapalus is related in the Book of Jonah, in which they repented at Jonah's word and did penance. Christ appears to be stating that on the day of judgment they will condemn the Scribes and the Jews who would not believe Christ.

Christ is said to be greater than Jonah in a number of ways which are enumerated by St. Augustine. Jonah was a prophet and a servant: Christ Messiah and Lord. Jonah remained alive in the fish and came forth alive: Christ rose from death, and restored to life, came forth. Jonah preached unwillingly: Christ willingly. Jonah threatened the destruction of Nineveh: Christ promised the kingdom of Heaven. Jonah did no miracles: Christ did many. All the prophets prophesied of Christ: none of Jonah.

== Commentary from the Church Fathers ==
Chrysostom: "That none should think that the same things would come to pass now among the Jews, as had of old been among the Ninevites; that as Jonas converted them and their city was delivered out of danger, so the Jews should be converted after the resurrection, the Lord now shows the contrary, that they should have no fruit of the benefit of the passion, but should suffer moreover grievous things, as He signifies below in the example of the dæmon. But now He first shows what just punishment they shall suffer, saying, The men of Nineveh shall rise in judgment with this generation."

Saint Remigius: "The Lord shows in these words that there shall be one resurrection of the good and the bad against certain heretics, who said that there should be two, one of the good, another of the bad. These words likewise overthrow that fable of the Jews, who used to say that the Resurrection shall be held a thousand years before the Judgment; these words clearly proving that the Judgment shall ensue straight upon the Resurrection. And shall condemn it."

Jerome: "Not by a sentence of judgment, but by the comparison of their example; as He adds, For they repented at the preaching of Jonas; and, behold, a greater than Jonas is here. This word ‘hic’ is to be taken as an adverb of place, not as a pronoun. Jonas (according to the LXX (Septuagint)) preached for three days, (Jonah 3:4 ἔτι τρδῖς ἡμέδαι) I for this so long time; he to the Assyrians an unbelieving nation, I to God's own people the Jews; he preached with his voice only, doing no miracles, I, doing so many wonders, am falsely accused as Beelzebub."

Preceded by Matthew 12:40	Gospel of Matthew; Chapter 12	Succeeded by Matthew 12:42
