= Matthew 12:28 =

- ← 12:27 12:29 →
- Book: Gospel of Matthew
- Christian Bible part: New Testament

Matthew 12:28 is the 28th verse in the twelfth chapter of the Gospel of Matthew in the New Testament.

== Content ==
In the original Greek according to Westcott-Hort, this verse is:

Εἰ δὲ ἐγὼ ἐν πνεύματι Θεοῦ ἐκβάλλω τὰ δαιμόνια, ἄρα ἔφθασεν ἐφ᾿ ὑμᾶς ἡ βασιλεία τοῦ Θεοῦ.

In the King James Version of the Bible the text reads:

But if I cast out devils by the Spirit of God, then the kingdom of God is come unto you.

The New International Version translates the passage as:

But if I drive out demons by the Spirit of God, then the kingdom of God has come upon you.

== Analysis ==
"But if I by the Spirit of God ..." If Jesus by the power of God and the Holy Ghost not by Beelzebub cast out devils, then the preaching of Christ and John the Baptist, which primarily stated that the kingdom of Heaven was at hand, was true. It appears that Christ is working to drive out the kingdom of the devil and to replace it with the king of God. Luke 11:20 has "finger of God" rather than "Spirit of God". A reference to Exod. 8:19 in which the Egyptian magicians recognized the power of God working in Moses.

== Commentary from the Church Fathers ==
Chrysostom: "Yet He said not, My disciples, or Apostles, but your children; that if they chose to return again to their own privileges, they might take occasion hence; but if they should be ungrateful, they might not have even an impudent excuse. And the Apostles cast out dæmons by virtue of power which they had from Him, and yet the Pharisees made no such charge against them; for it was not the actions themselves, but the person of Christ to which they were opposed. Desiring then to show that the things which were said against Him were only jealous suspicions, He brings forward the Apostles. And also He leads them to a knowledge of Himself, showing how they stood in the way of their own good, and resisted their own salvation; whereas they ought to be joyful because He had come to bestow great goods upon them; If I by the Spirit of God cast out dæmons, then is the kingdom of God come upon you. This also shows that it is a matter of great power to cast out dæmons, and not an ordinary grace. And thus it is He reasons, Therefore is the kingdom of God come upon you, as much as to say, If this indeed be so, then is the Son of God come upon you. But this He hints darkly, that it may not seem hard to them. Also to draw their attention, He said not merely, The kingdom hath come, but, upon you; that is to say, These good things are coming for you; why do you oppose your own salvation; for this is the very sign given by the Prophets of the presence of the Son of God, that such works as these should be wrought by Divine power."

Jerome: "For the kingdom of God denotes Himself, of whom it is written in another place, The kingdom of God is among you; (Luke 17:21) and, There standeth one in the midst of you whom ye know not. (John 1:26) Or surely that kingdom which both John and the Lord Himself had preached above, Repent ye, for the kingdom of heaven is at hand. (Mat. 3:2 4:17.) There is also a third kingdom of the Holy Scripture which shall be taken from the Jews, and be given to a nation that brings forth the fruit thereof."

Hilary of Poitiers: "If then the disciples work by Christ, and Christ by the Spirit of God, already is the kingdom of God transferred to the Apostles through the office of the Mediator."

Glossa Ordinaria: " For the weakening of the kingdom of the Devil is the increase of the kingdom of God."

Augustine: " Whence the sense might be this, If I by Beelzebub vast out dæmons, then, according to your own opinion, the kingdom of God is come upon you, for the kingdom of the Devil, being thus divided against itself, cannot stand. Thus calling that the kingdom of God, in which the wicked are condemned, and are separated from the faithful, who are now doing penitence for their sins."

Preceded by Matthew 12:27	Gospel of Matthew; Chapter 12	Succeeded by Matthew 12:29
