= Matthew 12:30 =

- ← 12:29 12:31 →
- Book: Gospel of Matthew
- Christian Bible part: New Testament

Matthew 12:30 is the 30th verse in the twelfth chapter of the Gospel of Matthew in the New Testament.

== Content ==
In the original Greek according to Westcott-Hort, this verse is:

Ὁ μὴ ὢν μετ᾿ ἐμοῦ κατ᾿ ἐμοῦ ἐστι· καὶ ὁ μὴ συνάγων μετ᾿ ἐμοῦ σκορπίζει.

In the King James Version of the Bible the text reads:

He that is not with me is against me; and he that gathereth not with me scattereth abroad.

The New International Version translates the passage as:

"He who is not with me is against me, and he who does not gather with me scatters.

== Analysis ==
Many understand "he" as referring to the devil. For what Christ gathers he seeks to disperse. This is Christ's fourth argument against the Scribes who accused Him of working by the power of the devil. Christ here states that His works are contrary to the devil's, for the devil according to Lapide, "desires to hold captive the souls of men, but the Lord wishes to save them. He preaches idolatry, Christ, the knowledge of the one God; the one draws to vice, the other recalls to virtue. How, then, can they have agreement between themselves, whose works are contrary?"

This saying of Christ seems opposed to Luke 9:50, "for whoever is not against you is for you." However, this is often explained that He is speaking of one who is in doctrinal agreement with the Apostles, and therefore is with them and for them.

== Commentary from the Church Fathers ==
Chrysostom: "After that third reply, here follows a fourth, He that is not with me is against me."

Hilary of Poitiers: "Wherein He shows how far He is from having borrowed any power from the Devil; teaching us how great the danger to think amiss of Him, not to be with Whom, is the same as to be against Him."

Jerome: "But let none think that this is said of heretics and schismatics; though we may apply it besides to such; but it is shown by the context to refer to the Devil; in that the works of the Saviour cannot be compared with the works of Beelzebub. He seeks to hold men’s souls in captivity, the Lord to set them free; he preaches idols, the Lord the knowledge of the true God; he draws men to sin, the Lord calls them back to virtues. How then can these have agreement together, whose works are so opposite?"

Chrysostom: "Therefore whoso gathereth not with me, nor is with me, may not be compared together with me, that with me he should cast out dæmons, but rather seeks to scatter what is mine. But tell me; If you were to have fought together with some one, and he should not be willing to come to your aid, is he not therefore against you? The Lord also Himself said in another place, He that is not against you is for you. (Luke 9:50) To which that which is here said is not contrary. For here He is speaking of the Devil who is our adversary—there of some man who was on their side, of whom it is said, We saw one casting out dæmons in thy name. Here He seems to allude to the Jews, classing them with the Devil; for they were against Him, and scattered what He would gather. But it is fair to allow that He spoke this of Himself; for He was against the Devil, and scattered abroad the things of the Devil."

== See also ==
- You are either with us, or against us

Preceded by Matthew 12:29	Gospel of Matthew; Chapter 12	Succeeded by Matthew 12:31
