= Matthew 12:36–37 =

Matthew 12:36-37
- ← 12:35 12:38 →
- Book: Gospel of Matthew
- Christian Bible part: New Testament

Matthew 12:36-37 are verses in the twelfth chapter of the Gospel of Matthew in the New Testament.

== Content ==
In the original Greek according to Westcott-Hort, these verses are:

36:Λέγω δὲ ὑμῖν ὅτι πᾶν ῥῆμα ἀργόν, ὃ ἐὰν λαλήσωσιν οἱ ἄνθρωποι, ἀποδώσουσι περὶ αὐτοῦ λόγον ἐν ἡμέρᾳ κρίσεως.
37:Ἐκ γὰρ τῶν λόγων σου δικαιωθήσῃ, καὶ ἐκ τῶν λόγων σου καταδικασθήσῃ.

In the King James Version of the Bible the text reads:

36:But I say unto you, That every idle word that men shall speak, they shall give account thereof in the day of judgment.
37:For by thy words thou shalt be justified, and by thy words thou shalt be condemned.

The New International Version translates the passage as:

36:But I tell you that men will have to give account on the day of judgment for every careless word they have spoken.
37:For by your words you will be acquitted, and by your words you will be condemned."

== Analysis ==
This giving an account appears to imply that everyone will have to render an account to Christ the Judge for their idle words. The Greek word for idle is ἀργόν, which literally means without work (ἀ+εργόν), that is, something lacking fruit and utility. Some translate the word as calumnious.

St. Bernard of Clairvaux writes, "An idle word is one spoken without reasonable cause. Such therefore is not one which is spoken pleasantly, to console the afflicted, or to exhilarate those who are sick and sad. Neither is it one which teaches human wisdom, as when the words and deeds of others are related, with this end, that, from them, we may learn to act and speak prudently."

From this it appears that not only by works, but also by words, one should be careful as a Christian for an account of both must be rendered to God. In a sense, they are both fruit from the same tree.

== Commentary from the Church Fathers ==
Chrysostom: "The Lord follows up what He had said before by moving their fears, showing that they that have thus sinned shall receive the most extreme punishment, I say unto you, that every idle word that men shall speak, they shall give an account thereof in the day of judgment."

Also: "He said not ‘which ye have spoken’, but makes His teaching of universal application to the whole race of mankind, and at the same time His words less grievous to them that heard them. By an idle word is meant one that is false, that accuses any falsely. Some indeed say that it includes all light talk, all such as stirs immoderate laughter, or shameful and immodest words."

Also: "See that this sentence is not a burdensome one. The Judge will pass sentence not according to what any other has said concerning you, but according to what you have yourself spoken. They that are accused then have no need to fear, but they that accuse; for those are not charged of those evil things that have been spoken of them, but these of those evil things that they have spoken."

Jerome: "And the meaning is; If every idle word which does not edify the hearers is not without danger to him that speaks it, and if each man shall render an account of his words in the day of judgment, how much more shall you, who have spoken falsely against the works of the Holy Spirit, saying that I cast out dæmons through Beelzebub, render an account of your false charge?"

Also: "Being spoken without the profit of either the speaker or hearer; as if laying aside weighty matters we should speak of frivolous trifles, or relate old fables. For he that deals in buffoon jests to create laughter, or brings forth any thing shameful, he will be held guilty not of an idle, but of a sinful word."

Gregory the Great: "Or such as lacks either rightness in itself, or reasons of just necessity;"

Saint Remigius: "The words which here follow depend on those that went before; By thy words thou shat be justified, and by thy words thou shalt be condemned. There is no doubt but that every man shall be condemned for his evil words which he speaks; but none shall be justified for his good words, unless they proceed from his inmost heart, and from a entire purpose."

Preceded by Matthew 12:35	Gospel of Matthew; Chapter 12	Succeeded by Matthew 12:38
