= Matthew 12:26 =

- ← 12:25 12:27 →
- Book: Gospel of Matthew
- Christian Bible part: New Testament

Matthew 12:26 is the 26th verse in the twelfth chapter of the Gospel of Matthew in the New Testament.

== Content ==
In the original Greek according to Westcott-Hort, this verse is:

Καὶ εἰ ὁ Σατανᾶς τὸν Σατανᾶν ἐκβάλλει, ἐφ᾿ ἑαυτὸν ἐμερίσθη· πῶς οὖν σταθήσεται ἡ βασιλεία αὐτοῦ;

In the King James Version of the Bible the text reads:

And if Satan cast out Satan, he is divided against himself; how shall then his kingdom stand?

The New International Version translates the passage as:

If Satan drives out Satan, he is divided against himself. How then can his kingdom stand?

== Analysis ==
If Satan cast out Satan ... implies that the kingdom of Satan upon earth could not stand, if one devil were always to be rising up and fighting with another devil, so that the inferior would be endless working to remove his superior. So Christ working to expel demons must be from God, because Beelzebub would never send out devils to drive each other out, since this would bring his kingdom to ruin.

Lapide relates the following story based on this passage: "An aged priest, worthy of credit, who had discharged the office of exorcist for many years and expelled devils at Rome, once told me he had seen with his eyes, and heard with his ears, two men possessed with devils, contending and fighting with one another, in the Church of S. Matthew. The devil who possessed one of the men was of a higher order and superior to the other; and he wished to cast out the other devil, as an inferior, from the man whom he possessed. But the inferior devil resisted, and greatly abused his superior; and among other things, he said to him, “Thou art an infernal devil, and by the just judgment of God being banished to hell, art far more heavily punished than I am, who am not an infernal devil, but am permitted to live here in the air, because I did not rebel against God as thou didst, but only clave and consented to Lucifer, as a subject to my superior.” But such things as this are very uncommon and are succeeded by peace, even as these two devils after a short time laid aside their contention, and rested, and held their peace. For although those who are damned, and the devils, burn with pride, wrath, and hatred one against another, and quarrel, and tear one another in hell like dogs; nevertheless, on earth they must agree among themselves, in order that they may establish their kingdom and dominion over men."

== Commentary from the Church Fathers ==
Hilary of Poitiers: "But the word of God is rich, and whether taken simply, or examined inwardly, it is needful for our advancement. Leaving therefore what belongs to the plain understanding thereof, let us dwell on some of the more secret reasons. The Lord is about to make answer to that which they had said concerning Beelzebub, and He casts upon those to whom He made answer a condition of their answering. Thus; The Law was from God and the promise of the kingdom to Israel was by the Law, but if the kingdom of the Law be divided in itself, it must needs be destroyed; and thus Israel lost the Law, when the nation whose was the Law, rejected the fulfilment of the Law in Christ. The city here spoken of is Jerusalem, which when it raged with the madness of its people against the Lord, and drove out His Apostles with the multitude of them that believed, after this division shall not stand; and thus (which soon happened in consequence of this division) the destruction of that city is declared. Again He puts another case, And if Satan cast out Satan, he is divided against himself; how then shall his kingdom stand?"

Jerome: "As much as to say, If Satan fight against himself, and dæmon be an enemy to dæmon, then must the end of the world be at hand, that these hostile powers should have no place there, whose mutual war is peace for men."

Glossa Ordinaria: " He holds them therefore in this dilemma. For Christ casts out dæmons either by the power of God, or by the Prince of the dæmons. If by the power of God, their accusations are malicious; if by the Prince of the dæmons, his kingdom is divided, and will not stand, and therefore let them depart out of his kingdom. And this alternative He intimates that they had chosen for themselves, when they refused to believe in Him."

Chrysostom: "Or thus; If he is divided, he is made weak, and perishes; but if he perishes, how can he cast out another?"

Hilary of Poitiers: "Otherwise; If the dæmon was driven to this division to the end that he should thus afflict the dæmons, even thus must we attribute higher power to Him who made the division than to those who are thus divided; thus the kingdom of the Devil, after this division made, is destroyed by Christ."

Jerome: "But if ye think, ye Scribes and Pharisees, that the dæmons depart out of the possessed in obedience to their Prince, that men may be imposed upon by a concerted fraud, what can ye say to the healing of diseases which the Lord also wrought? It is something more if ye assign to the dæmons even bodily infirmities, and the signs of spiritual virtues."

Preceded by Matthew 12:25	Gospel of Matthew; Chapter 12	Succeeded by Matthew 12:27
