= Matthew 12:27 =

- ← 12:26 12:28 →
- Book: Gospel of Matthew
- Christian Bible part: New Testament

Matthew 12:27 is the 27th verse in the twelfth chapter of the Gospel of Matthew in the New Testament.

== Content ==
In the original Greek according to Westcott-Hort, this verse is:

Καὶ εἰ ἐγὼ ἐν Βεελζεβοὺλ ἐκβάλλω τὰ δαιμόνια, οἱ υἱοὶ ὑμῶν ἐν τίνι ἐκβάλλουσι; Διὰ τοῦτο αὐτοὶ ὑμῶν ἔσονται κριταί.

In the King James Version of the Bible the text reads:

And if I by Beelzebub cast out devils, by whom do your sons cast them out? therefore they shall be your judges.

The New International Version translates the passage as:

And if I drive out demons by Beelzebub, by whom do your people drive them out? So then, they will be your judges.

== Analysis ==
This is Christ's second proof that he casts out devils by God, not Satan. By your sons is understood by some to imply the Apostles, because they were sons of the Jews. Those who believe this, suppose that this happened after Christ sent the Apostles out, and when the Apostles, by the power of Christ, cast out devils, and did miracles. However others believe that this occurred before the mission of the Apostles. In which case "your sons," would be the Jewish exorcists, who, expelled demons. An example of these exorcists is the seven sons of Sceva, a chief of the priests. (see Acts 19:14) "... be your judges," implies that possibly their own exorcists will condemn them since they have passed a perverted judgment on Christ, even though Christ did far greater proofs of the presence and operation of God than was done by the exorcists.

== Commentary from the Church Fathers ==
Chrysostom: "After the first answer, He comes to a second more plain than the first, saying, And if I by Beelzebub cast out dæmons, by whom do your sons cast them out? Therefore shall they be your judges."

Jerome: "He alludes, as is His manner, under the name children of the Jews, either to the exorcists of that race, or to the Apostles who are by race of that nation. If He means the exorcists who by the invocation of God cast out dæmons, He thus constrains the Pharisees by a wise enquiry to confess that their work was of the Holy Spirit. If, He would say, the casting out of the dæmons by your children is imputed to God, and not to dæmons, why should the same work wrought by Me not have the same cause? Therefore shall they be your judges, not by authority but by comparison, they ascribe the casting out of the dæmons to God, you to the Prince of the dæmons. But if it is of the Apostles also that this is said, (and so we should rather take it,) then they shall be their judges, for they shall sit on twelve thrones judging the twelve tribes of Israel."

Hilary of Poitiers: "And they are worthily appointed judges over them, to whom Christ is found to have given that power over the dæmons, which it was denied that He had."

Rabanus Maurus: "Or, because the Apostles well knew within their own conscience that they had learnt no evil art from Him."

Preceded by Matthew 12:26	Gospel of Matthew; Chapter 12	Succeeded by Matthew 12:28
