= Matthew 12:35 =

- ← 12:34 12:36 →
- Book: Gospel of Matthew
- Christian Bible part: New Testament

Matthew 12:35 is the 35th verse in the twelfth chapter of the Gospel of Matthew in the New Testament.

== Content ==
In the original Greek according to Westcott-Hort, this verse is:

Ὁ ἀγαθὸς ἄνθρωπος ἐκ τοῦ ἀγαθοῦ θησαυροῦ τῆς καρδίας ἐκβάλλει τὰ ἀγαθά· καὶ ὁ πονηρὸς ἄνθρωπος ἐκ τοῦ πονηροῦ θησαυροῦ ἐκβάλλει πονηρά.

In the King James Version of the Bible the text reads:

A good man out of the good treasure of the heart bringeth forth good things: and an evil man out of the evil treasure bringeth forth evil things.

The New International Version translates the passage as:

The good man brings good things out of the good stored up in him, and the evil man brings evil things out of the evil stored up in him.

== Analysis ==
Here Jesus explains the abundance of the heart by a treasure, which is an accumulation of goods. So a good person from the good heap of good thoughts and affections which he accumulates in his mind, naturally brings forth good words and works. However, an evil man, from the evil heap of evil affections in his mind, brings forth evil words and works.

== Commentary from the Church Fathers ==
Jerome: "What He says, The good man out of the good treasure of his heart, & c. is either pointed against the Jews, that seeing they blasphemed God, what treasure in their heart must that be out of which such blasphemy proceeded; or it is connected with what had gone before, that like as a good man cannot bring forth evil things, nor an evil man good things, so Christ cannot do evil works, nor the Devil good works."

Preceded by Matthew 12:34	Gospel of Matthew; Chapter 12	Succeeded by Matthew 12:36
