= Matthew 12:40 =

- ← 12:39 12:41 →
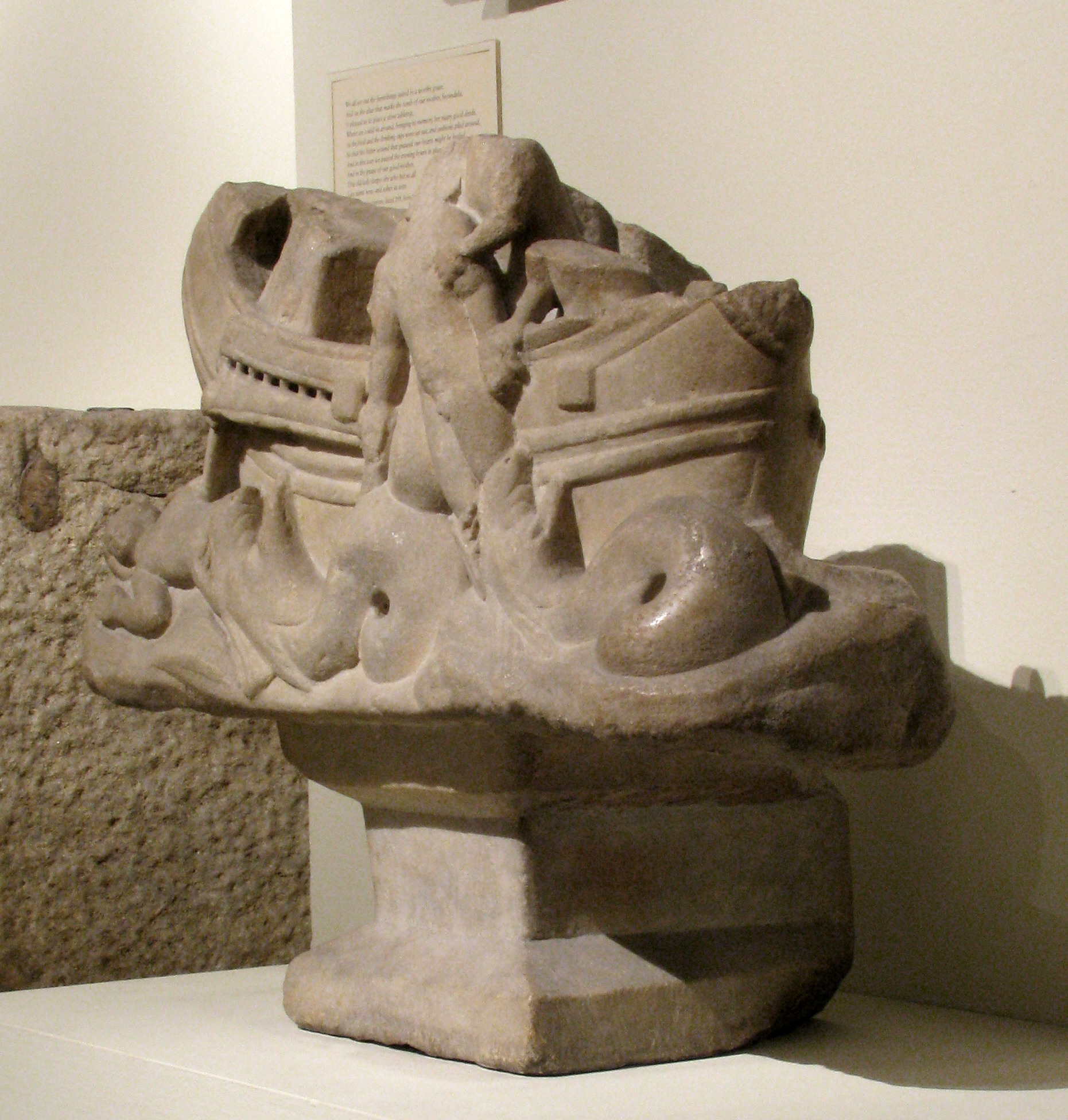
- Table Base with Jonah "Swallowed and Cast Up by the Big Fish" (white marble from early 300s)
- Book: Gospel of Matthew
- Christian Bible part: New Testament

Matthew 12:40 is the 40th verse in the twelfth chapter of the Gospel of Matthew in the New Testament.

== Content ==
In the original Greek according to Westcott-Hort, this verse is:

Ὥσπερ γὰρ ἦν Ἰωνᾶς ἐν τῇ κοιλίᾳ τοῦ κήτους τρεῖς ἡμέρας καὶ τρεῖς νύκτας, οὕτως ἔσται ὁ υἱὸς τοῦ ἀνθρώπου ἐν τῇ καρδίᾳ τῆς γῆς τρεῖς ἡμέρας καὶ τρεῖς νύκτας.

In the King James Version of the Bible the text reads:

For as Jonas was three days and three nights in the whale’s belly; so shall the Son of man be three days and three nights in the heart of the earth.

The New International Version translates the passage as:

For as Jonah was three days and three nights in the belly of a huge fish, so the Son of Man will be three days and three nights in the heart of the earth.

== Analysis ==
In the heart seems to refer to the lowest part of the earth, that is, within the earth, just as the heart is within the human body. This is related in 1 Peter 3:19, that after Christ died on the cross, and His body was placed in the tomb, His soul descend into Limbo, which is near the centre of the earth.

== Commentary from the Church Fathers ==
Augustine: "Some, not knowing the Scripture manner of speaking, would interpret as one night those three hours of darkness when the sun was darkened from the sixth to the ninth hour; and as a day in like manner those other three hours in which it was again restored to the world, from the ninth hour till sunset. Then follows the night preceding the sabbath, which if we reckon with its own day we shall have thus two days and two nights. Then after the sabbath follows the night of the sabbath prime, that is of the dawning of the Lord’s day on which the Lord arose. Thus we shall only get two nights and two days, with this one night to be added if we might understand the whole of it, and it could not be shown that that dawn was indeed the latter part of the night. So that not even by taking in those six hours, three of darkness, and three of restored light, can we establish the computation of three days and three nights. It remains therefore that we find the explanation in that usual manner of Scripture of putting a part for the whole."

Jerome: "Not that He remained three whole days and three nights in hell, but that this be understood to imply a part of the preparation day, and of the Lord’s day, and the whole sabbath day."

Augustine: "For that the three days were not three full and entire days, Scripture witnesses; the first day is reckoned because the latter end of it comes in; and the third day is likewise reckoned, because the first part of it is included; while the day between, that is the second day, appears in all its twenty-four hours, twelve of the night and twelve of the day. For the succeeding night up to the dawn when the Lord’s resurrection was made known, belongs to the third day. For as the first days of creation were, because of man’s coming fall, computed from morning to night; so these days are because of man’s restoration computed from night to morning."

Chrysostom: "He said not openly that He should rise again, because they would have derided him, but hints it distantly that even they might believe that He foreknew it. He said not in the earth, but in the heart of the earth, therein declaring His tomb, and that none might suspect that there was only the semblance of death. Therefore also He spake of three days, that it should be believed that He was dead. But the sign itself proves the truth of it; for Jonas was in the whale’s belly not in figure but in deed; and surely the sign did not happen in very deed, if the thing signified happened only in figure. Wherefore it is manifest that they are children of the Devil who follow Marcion asserting that the passion of Christ was only a phantasy. And that He should suffer for them also, though they would not profit by it, is shown by that which He speaks, that to this generation should be given the sign of Jonas the Prophet."

Preceded by Matthew 12:39	Gospel of Matthew; Chapter 12	Succeeded by Matthew 12:41
