= Matthew 12:29 =

- ← 12:28 12:30 →
- Book: Gospel of Matthew
- Christian Bible part: New Testament

Matthew 12:29 is the 29th verse in the twelfth chapter of the Gospel of Matthew in the New Testament.

== Content ==
In the original Greek according to Westcott-Hort, this verse is:

Ἢ πῶς δύναταί τις εἰσελθεῖν εἰς τὴν οἰκίαν τοῦ ἰσχυροῦ καὶ τὰ σκεύη αὐτοῦ διαρπάσαι, ἐὰν μὴ πρῶτον δήσῃ τὸν ἰσχυρόν; Καὶ τότε τὴν οἰκίαν αὐτοῦ διαρπάσει.

In the King James Version of the Bible the text reads:

Or else how can one enter into a strong man’s house, and spoil his goods, except he first bind the strong man? and then he will spoil his house.

The New International Version translates the passage as:

Or again, how can anyone enter a strong man's house and carry off his possessions unless he first ties up the strong man? Then he can rob his house.

== Analysis ==
This is the third reason that Christ gives to prove that He casts out devils by the help of God, not by Beelzebub. Essentially the argument is by comparison. That is, he who attacks the stronghold of any valiant person, like Samson or Hercules, to plunder it, must first conquer and bind the strong man. So also Christ overcomes the kingdom of Satan by guiding sinners, his subjects, to repentance and to salvation. So Satan must be His enemy. Allegorically Lapide asserts that the strong man, is the devil; the house is the world; the vessels are his arms; his goods, his instruments. The weapons of the devil are fraud and deceit, through which he leads people to sin. Other weapons are wealth, honors, riches. His goods are the souls of sinners, and the bodies of the possessed; in addition to the souls of those detained in Limbo before Christ. All of these Christ took from the devil, and bound him in hell. Note that devil is here called a strong one, since he goes about like a roaring lion seeking whom he may devour (1 Peter). Job (chapters 40 and 41) depicts his strength with the figures of Behemoth and Leviathan. The conquering of Lucifer by the Cross and being thrust into hell where he remains, bound, until the day of judgment is recorded in Revelation 20.

== Commentary from the Church Fathers ==
Chrysostom: "Having concluded the second answer, He brings forward yet a third, saying, Or how can any enter into a strong man’s house? For that Satan cannot cast out Satan is clear from what has been said; and that no other can cast him out, till he have first overcome him, is plain to all. Thus the same as before is established yet more abundantly; for He says, So far am I from having the Devil for my ally, that I rather am at war with him, and bind him; and in that I cast out after this sort, I therein spoil his goods. Thus He proves the very contrary of that they strove to establish. They would show that He did not cast out dæmons of His own power; He proves that not only dæmons, yea but the prince also of the dæmons He hath bound, as is shown by that which He hath wrought. For if their Prince were not overcome, how were the dæmons who are His subjects thus spoiled. This speech seems also to me to be a prophecy; inasmuch as He not only casts out dæmons, but will take away all error out of the world, and dissolve the craft of the Devil; and He says not rob, but spoil, showing that He will do it with power."

Jerome: "His house is this world, which is set in evil, not by the majesty of the Creator, but by the greatness of the sinner. The strong man is bound and chained in tartarus, bruised by the Lord’s foot. Yet ought we not therefore to be careless; for here the conqueror Himself pronounces our adversary to be strong."

Chrysostom: "He calls him strong, showing therein his old reign, which arose out of our sloth."

Augustine: " For he held us, that we should not by our own strength be able to free ourselves from him, but by the grace of God. By his goods, he means all the unbelievers. He has bound the strong man, in that He has taken away from him all power of hindering the faithful from following Christ, and gaining the kingdom of heaven."

Rabanus Maurus: "Therefore He has spoiled his house, in that them whom He foresaw should be His own, He set free from the snares of the Devil, and has joined to the Church. Or in that He has divided the whole world among His Apostles and their successors to be converted. By this plain parable therefore He shows that He does not join in a deceitful working with the dæmons as they falsely accused Him, but by the might of His divinity He frees men from the dæmons."

Preceded by Matthew 12:28	Gospel of Matthew; Chapter 12	Succeeded by Matthew 12:30
