= Matthew 12:34 =

- ← 12:33 12:35 →
- Book: Gospel of Matthew
- Christian Bible part: New Testament

Matthew 12:34 is the 34th verse in the twelfth chapter of the Gospel of Matthew in the New Testament.

== Content ==
In the original Greek according to Westcott-Hort, this verse is:

Γεννήματα ἐχιδνῶν, πῶς δύνασθε ἀγαθὰ λαλεῖν, πονηροὶ ὄντες; Ἐκ γὰρ τοῦ περισσεύματος τῆς καρδίας τὸ στόμα λαλεῖ.

In the King James Version of the Bible the text reads:

O generation of vipers, how can ye, being evil, speak good things? for out of the abundance of the heart the mouth speaketh.

The New International Version translates the passage as:

You brood of vipers, how can you who are evil say anything good? For the mouth speaks what the heart is full of.

== Analysis ==
Christ here calls the Pharisees vipers, because they spoke viperous words and calumnies, trying to defame Christ and cut Him off. It is said they had hearts of vipers, since they were full of the poison of envy, pride, hatred and malice against Christ. Thus from what is in one's heart one speaks. So when the mind and the will are full of goodness and charity, one says good and loving things. However, if someone is in the gall of malice and envy, they will speak words of gall and envy and bitterness.

== Commentary from the Church Fathers ==
Chrysostom: "But as speaking not for Himself but for the Holy Spirit, He accordingly rebukes them, saying, Generation of vipers, how can ye being evil speak good things? This is both a rebuke of them, and a proof in their own characters of those things which had been said. As though He had said, So ye being corrupt trees cannot bring forth good fruit. I do not wonder then that you thus speak, for you are ill nourished of ill parentage, and have an evil mind. And observe He said not, How can ye speak good things, seeing ye are a generation of vipers? for these two are not connected together; but He said, How can ye being evil speak good things? He calls them generation of vipers, because they made boast of their forefathers; in order therefore to cut off this their pride, He shuts them out of the race of Abraham, assigning them a parentage corresponding to their characters."

Rabanus Maurus: "Or the words, Generation of vipers, may be taken as signifying children, or imitators of the Devil, because they had wilfully spoken against good works, which is of the Devil, and thence follows, Out of the abundance of the heart the mouth speaketh. That man speaks out of the abundance of the heart who is not ignorant with what intention his words are uttered; and to declare his meaning more openly He adds, A good man out of the good treasure of his heart bringeth forth good things. The treasure of the heart is the intention of the thoughts, by which the Judge judges that work which is produced, so that sometimes though the outward work that is shown seem great, yet because of the carelessness of a cold heart, they receive a little reward from the Lord."

Chrysostom: "Herein also He shows His Godhead as knowing the hidden things of the heart; for not for words only, yea but for evil thoughts also they shall receive punishment. For it is the order of nature that the store of the wickedness which abounds within should be poured forth in words through the mouth. Thus when you shall hear any speaking evil, you must infer that his wickedness is more than what his words express; for what is uttered without is but the overflowing of that within; which was a sharp rebuke to them. For if that which was spoken by them were so evil, consider how evil must be the root from whence it sprung. And this happens naturally; for oftentimes the hesitating tongue does not suddenly pour forth all its evil, while the heart, to which none other is privy, begets whatsoever evil it will, without fear; for it has little fear of God. But when the multitude of the evils which are within is increased, the things which had been hidden then burst forth through the mouth. This is that He says, Out of the abundance of the heart the mouth speaketh."

Preceded by Matthew 12:33	Gospel of Matthew; Chapter 12	Succeeded by Matthew 12:35
