= Matthew 12:38 =

- ← 12:37 12:39 →
- Book: Gospel of Matthew
- Christian Bible part: New Testament

Matthew 12:38 is the 38th verse in the twelfth chapter of the Gospel of Matthew in the New Testament.

== Content ==
In the original Greek according to Westcott-Hort, this verse is:

Τότε ἀπεκρίθησάν τινες τῶν γραμματέων καὶ Φαρισαίων, λέγοντες, Διδάσκαλε, θέλομεν ἀπὸ σοῦ σημεῖον ἰδεῖν.

In the King James Version of the Bible the text reads:

Then certain of the scribes and of the Pharisees answered, saying, Master, we would see a sign from thee.

The New International Version translates the passage as:

Then some of the Pharisees and teachers of the law said to him, "Teacher, we want to see a miraculous sign from you."

== Analysis ==
Note that Luke (11:16) includes "[a sign] from Heaven". The scribes and Pharisees mentioned here are the ones who previously stated that Christ had cast out devils by the help of Beelzebub. Now they ask for a heavenly sign. According to Lapide, the meaning of the scribes is as follows: "O Christ, are in the earth and of the earth, but we wish to see celestial miracles in Heaven. For God, Whom You assert to be the Author of these miracles, dwells in Heaven. Cause, therefore, that fire may come down from Heaven, as Elijah did; or that the sky may flash with new and marvellous thunders and lightnings, as Samuel did (1 Sam. 7:10); or that the sun should stand still, as Joshua did."

Pope Paul VI notes that Jesus could have given a sign, but he "adapted the number of His miracles and their demonstrative force to the dispositions and good will of His hearers".

Similarities between this verse and the next one, and Matthew 16:1–4 and the parallel passages in Mark 8:11-13; Luke 11:16, 29-32, are noted; the comparison of the passages in Matthew 12 and Matthew 16 is as follows.

Matthew 12:38–39	Matthew 16:1–4
^{38}Then some of the scribes and Pharisees said to him, "Teacher, we wish to see a sign from you." ^{39}But he answered them, "An evil and adulterous generation seeks for a sign; but no sign shall be given to it except the sign of the prophet Jonah."	^{1}And the Pharisees and Sadducees came, and to test him they asked him to show them a sign from heaven. ^{2}He answered them, "When it is evening, you say, «It will be fair weather; for the sky is red.» ^{3}And in the morning, 'It will be stormy today, for the sky is red and threatening.' You know how to interpret the appearance of the sky, but you cannot interpret the signs of the times.^{4}An evil and adulterous generation seeks for a sign, but no sign shall be given to it except the sign of Jonah."

== Commentary from the Church Fathers ==
Chrysostom: "Because the Lord had so oft repressed the shameless tongue of the Pharisees by His sayings, they now turn to His works, whereat the Evangelist wondering, says, Then certain of the Scribes and Pharisees answered, saying, Master, we would see a sign of thee; and that at a time when they should have been moved, when they should have wondered, and been dumb with astonishment; yet even at such time they desist not from their malice. For they say, We would see a sign of thee, that they may take Him as in a snare."

Jerome: "They require a sign of Him, as though what they had seen were not signs; and in another Evangelist what they required is more fully expressed, We would see of thee a sign from heaven. Either they would have fire from heaven as Elias did; or after the example of Samuel they would that in summer-time, contrary to the nature of the climate, thunder should be heard, lightnings gleam, and rain descend; as though they could not have spoken falsely even against such miracles, and said that they befel by reason of divers hidden motions in the air. For if thou cavillest against what thou not only beholdest with thine eyes, but feelest with thine hand, and reapest the benefit of, what wilt thou do in those things which come down from heaven. You might make answer, that in Egypt the magi also had given many signs from heaven."

Chrysostom: "But their words are full of hypocrisy and irony. But now they were railing against Him, saying that He had a dæmon; now they fawn upon Him, calling Him, Master. Wherefore the Lord rebukes them severely; He answered and said unto them, An evil and adulterous generation seeketh after a sign. When they railed on Him, He had answered them mildly; now they approached Him with smooth and deceitful words, He rebukes them sharply; showing that He was above either affection, and was neither moved to anger by evil speaking, nor was to be gained by flattery. What He says is this; What wonder that ye do thus to Me who am unknown to you, when you have done the same to the Father, of whom ye have had such large knowledge, in that, despising Him ye went after dæmons? He calls them an evil generation, because they have ever been ungrateful to their benefactors, and were made worse when they received benefits, which is the extreme of wickedness."

Preceded by Matthew 12:37	Gospel of Matthew; Chapter 12	Succeeded by Matthew 12:39
