= Matthew 12:33 =

- ← 12:32 12:34 →
- Book: Gospel of Matthew
- Christian Bible part: New Testament

Matthew 12:33 is the 33rd verse in the twelfth chapter of the Gospel of Matthew in the New Testament.

== Content ==
In the original Greek according to Westcott-Hort, this verse is:

Ἢ ποιήσατε τὸ δένδρον καλόν, καὶ τὸν καρπὸν αὐτοῦ καλόν, ἢ ποιήσατε τὸ δένδρον σαπρόν, καὶ τὸν καρπὸν αὐτοῦ σαπρόν· ἐκ γὰρ τοῦ καρποῦ τὸ δένδρον γινώσκεται.

In the King James Version of the Bible the text reads:

Either make the tree good, and his fruit good; or else make the tree corrupt, and his fruit corrupt: for the tree is known by his fruit.

The New International Version translates the passage as:

"Make a tree good and its fruit will be good, or make a tree bad and its fruit will be bad, for a tree is recognized by its fruit.

== Analysis ==
This is Christ's fifth argument against the Scribes, where most people understand that the tree is Christ. To "make" is to assert. So that either the Scribes and Pharisees must approve and praise Christ, together with His works, which seem to be laudable; or condemn Him along with His works as a bad tree. So Jesus seems to be saying, "if you praise my works, you should likewise to praise their author." Other authors have understood the tree to be the Pharisees. So that Christ appears to be saying, "if you wish to be accounted good, do good works, namely, praise good men and good things. But if you do evil, when you condemn Me and My Divine works, you should confess yourselves to be calumniators, for a calumniator is known by his calumnies, as a tree is known by its fruit.

== Commentary from the Church Fathers ==
Chrysostom: " After his former answers He here again refutes them in another manner. This He does not in order to do away their charges against Himself, but desiring to amend them, saying, Either make the tree good and his fruit good, or make the tree corrupt, and his fruit corrupt. As much as to say, None of you has said that it is an evil thing for a man to be delivered from dæmons. But because they did not speak evil of the works, but said that it was the Devil that wrought them, He shows that this charge is contrary to the common sense of things, and human conceptions. And to invent such charges can only proceed from unbounded impudence."

Jerome: "Thus He holds them in a syllogism which the Greeks call ‘Aphycton,’ the unavoidable; which shuts in the person questioned on both sides, and presses him with either horn. If, He saith, the Devil be evil, he cannot do good works; so that if the works you see be good, it follows that the Devil was not the agent thereof. For it cannot be that good should come of evil, or evil of good."

Chrysostom: "For the discerning of a tree is done by its fruits, not the fruits by the tree. A tree is known by its fruits. For though the tree is the cause of the fruit, yet the fruit is the evidence of the tree. But ye do the very contrary, having no fault to allege against the works, ye pass a sentence of evil against the tree, saying that I have a dæmon."

Hilary of Poitiers: "Thus did He at that present refute the Jews, who seeing Christ’s works to be of power more than human, would notwithstanding not allow the hand of God. And at the same time He convicts all future errors of the faith, such as that of those who taking away from the Lord His divinity, and communion of the Father’s substance, have fallen into divers heresies; having their habitation neither under the plea of ignorance as the Gentiles, nor yet within the knowledge of the truth. He figures Himself as a tree set in the body, seeing that through the inward fruitfulness of His power sprung forth abundant richness of fruit. Therefore either must be made a good tree with good fruits, or an evil tree with evil fruits; not that a good tree is to be made a bad tree, or the reverse; but that in this metaphor we may understand that Christ is either to be left in fruitlessness, or to be retained in the fruitfulness of good works. But to hold one’s self neuter, to attribute some things to Christ, but to deny Him those things that are highest, to worship Him as God, and yet to deny Him a common substance with the Father, is blasphemy against the Spirit. In admiration of His so great works you dare not take away the name of God, yet through malevolence of soul you debase His high nature by denying His participation of the Father’s substance."

Augustine: " Or this is an admonition to ourselves that we should be good trees that we may be able to bring forth good fruit; Make the tree good, and its fruit good, is a precept of health to which obedience is necessary. But what He says, Make the tree corrupt, and its fruit corrupt, is not a command to do, but a warning to take heed, spoken against those who being evil thought that they could speak good things, or have good works; this the Lord declares is impossible. The man must be changed first, that his works may be changed; for if the man remains in that wherein he is evil, he cannot have good works; if he remains in that wherein he is good, he cannot have evil works. Christ found us all corrupt trees, but gave power to become sons of God to them that believe on His name."

Preceded by Matthew 12:32	Gospel of Matthew; Chapter 12	Succeeded by Matthew 12:34
