= Matthew 12:42 =

- ← 12:41 12:43 →
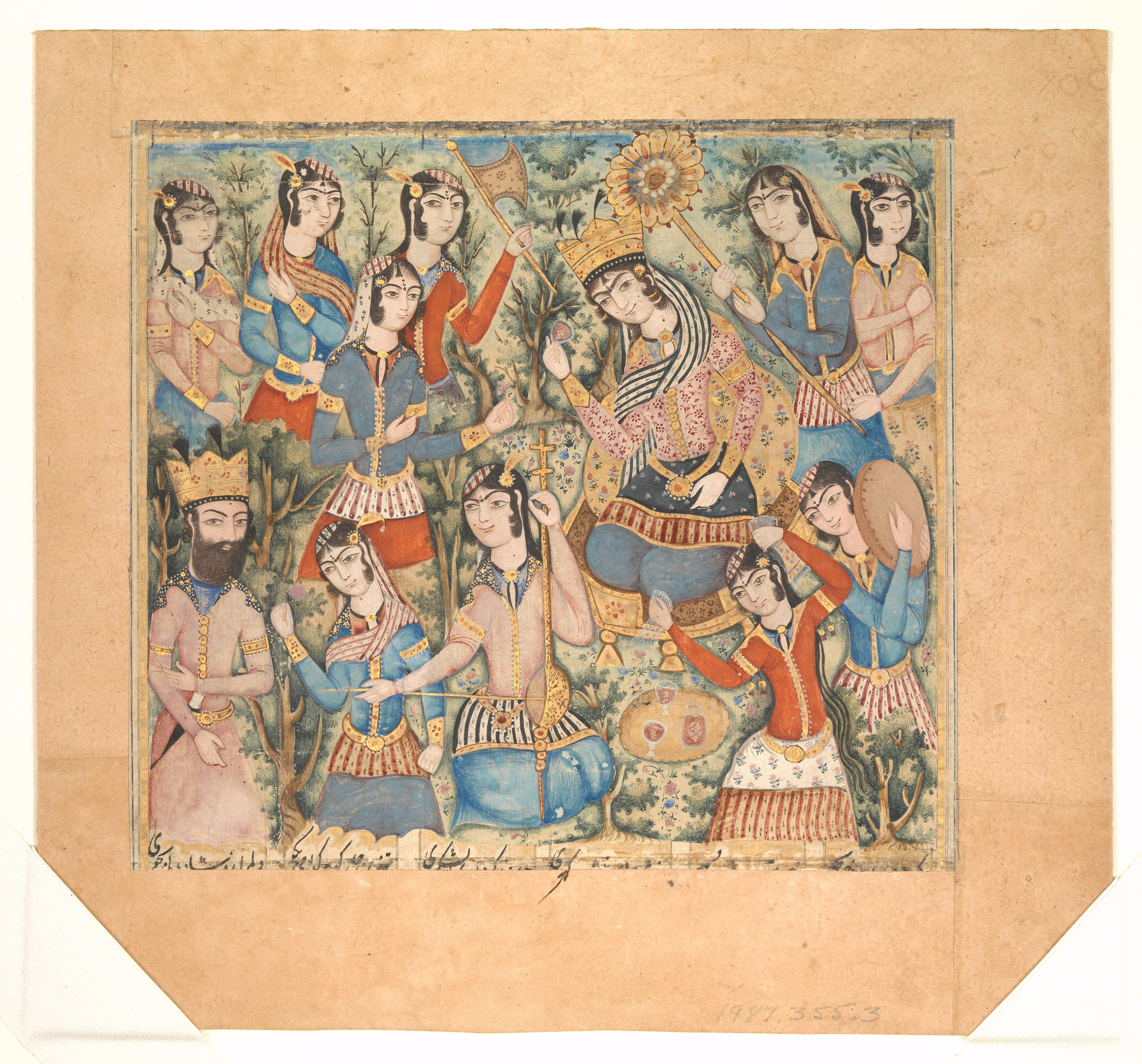
- "Solomon and the Queen of Sheba". Folio from an illustrated manuscript (early 19th century)
- Book: Gospel of Matthew
- Christian Bible part: New Testament

Matthew 12:42 is the 42nd verse in the twelfth chapter of the Gospel of Matthew in the New Testament.

== Content ==
In the original Greek according to Westcott-Hort, this verse is:

Βασίλισσα νότου ἐγερθήσεται ἐν τῇ κρίσει μετὰ τῆς γενεᾶς ταύτης καὶ κατακρινεῖ αὐτήν· ὅτι ἦλθεν ἐκ τῶν περάτων τῆς γῆς ἀκοῦσαι τὴν σοφίαν Σολομῶντος· καὶ ἰδού, πλεῖον Σολομῶντος ὧδε.

In the King James Version of the Bible, the text reads:

The queen of the south shall rise up in the judgment with this generation, and shall condemn it: for she came from the uttermost parts of the earth to hear the wisdom of Solomon; and, behold, a greater than Solomon is here.

The New International Version translates the passage as:

The Queen of the South will rise at the judgment with this generation and condemn it; for she came from the ends of the earth to listen to Solomon's wisdom, and now one greater than Solomon is here.

== Analysis ==
The Queen of the South generally is thought to be from Ethiopia, or to be the Queen of Sheba (1 Kings 10). According to Ethiopian tradition this queen was married to Solomon, and had a son by him. From him the Abyssinian kings are descended.

Jesus is said to speak in third-person of himself out of modesty. As of note many authors compare this queen who was a Gentile, and caught up in the business of her kingdom, but still was attracted by Solomon's earthly wisdom. She took the difficult journey to see him, but the Jewish scholars of the Divine Law, would not receive Christ who possessed all the wisdom of God.

== Commentary from the Church Fathers ==
Chrysostom: "Yet does not the Lord stay here, but adds another denunciation, saying, The queen of the south shall rise in the judgment with this generation, and shall condemn it, for she came from the ends of the earth to hear the wisdom of Solomon. This was yet more than that first. Jonas went to them; the queen of the south waited not for Solomon to come to her, but herself sought him. Both a woman and a barbarian, and dwelling so far away, she was not afraid of death in her desire to hear his wise words. This woman went to Solomon, I came hither; she rose up from the ends of the earth, I go round about your towns and villages; he spake of trees and wood, I of unspeakable mysteries."

Jerome: "So the queen of the south will condemn the Jews in the same manner as the men of Nineveh will condemn unbelieving Israel. This is the queen of Saba, of whom we read in the book of Kings and Chronicles, who leaving her nation and kingdom came through so many difficulties to hear the wisdom of Solomon, and brought him many gifts. Also in these instances of Nineveh and the queen of Saba, the faith of the Gentiles is significantly set above that of Israel."

Rabanus Maurus: "The Ninevites typify those who cease from sin—the queen those that know not to sin; for penitence puts away sin, wisdom shuns it."

Saint Remigius: "Beautifully is the Church gathered out of the Gentiles spoken of as a queen who knows how to rule her ways. Of her the Psalmist speaks; The queen stood on thy right hand. (Ps. 45:9.) She is the queen of the south because she abounds in the fervour of the Holy Spirit. Solomon, interpreted ‘peaceful,’ signifies Him of whom it is said, He is our peace. (Eph. 2:14.)"

Preceded by Matthew 12:41	Gospel of Matthew; Chapter 12	Succeeded by Matthew 12:43
