= Matthew 12:39 =

- ← 12:38 12:40 →
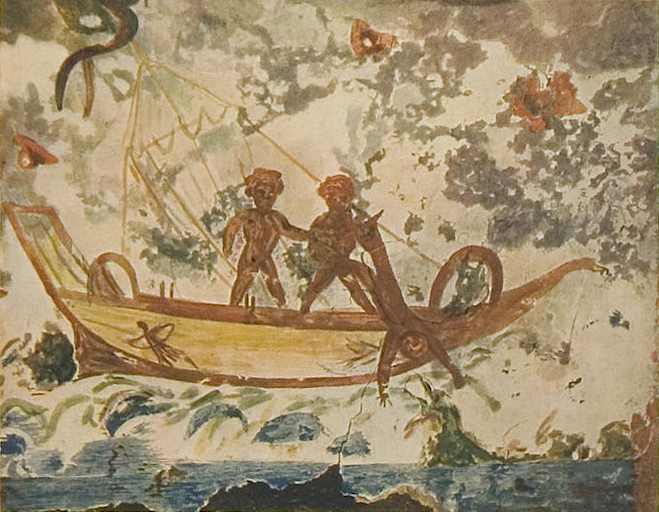
- "Prophet Jonah being thrown into the Sea", Paleochristian art found in Catacombe di Priscilla (made before 5th century)
- Book: Gospel of Matthew
- Christian Bible part: New Testament

Matthew 12:39 is the 39th verse in the twelfth chapter of the Gospel of Matthew in the New Testament.

== Content ==
In the original Greek according to Westcott-Hort, this verse is:

Ὁ δὲ ἀποκριθεὶς εἶπεν αὐτοῖς, Γενεὰ πονηρὰ καὶ μοιχαλὶς σημεῖον ἐπιζητεῖ· καὶ σημεῖον οὐ δοθήσεται αὐτῇ, εἰ μὴ τὸ σημεῖον Ἰωνᾶ τοῦ προφήτου.

In the King James Version of the Bible the text reads:

But he answered and said unto them, An evil and adulterous generation seeketh after a sign; and there shall no sign be given to it, but the sign of the prophet Jonas:

The New International Version translates the passage as:

He answered, "A wicked and adulterous generation asks for a miraculous sign! But none will be given it except the sign of the prophet Jonah".

== Analysis ==
The generation (Greek. γενεὰ, nation/race) of the time is called adulterous, that is, faithless and unbelieving. Lapide writes that this was perhaps because they left God and the faith and character of Abraham, Isaac and the rest of the Patriarchs. Since they all believed and testified of the Messiah, but these would not acknowledge Him when He was present.

The only sign Jesus promises is found in John 2, "Destroy this temple, and I will raise it up; but He spoke of the temple of His body." The prophet Jonah is a clear prefigure of the Resurrection since he emerges from the belly of the whale after 3 days.

Similarities of this verse and the previous one with Matthew 16:1–4 (and also the parallel passages in Mark 8:11-13; Luke 11:16, 29-32) are noted; the comparison of the passages in Matthew 12 and Matthew 16 is as follows.

Matthew 12:38–39	Matthew 16:1–4
^{38}Then some of the scribes and Pharisees said to him, "Teacher, we wish to see a sign from you." ^{39}But he answered them, "An evil and adulterous generation seeks for a sign; but no sign shall be given to it except the sign of the prophet Jonah."	^{1}And the Pharisees and Sadducees came, and to test him they asked him to show them a sign from heaven. ^{2}He answered them, "When it is evening, you say, «It will be fair weather; for the sky is red.» ^{3}And in the morning, 'It will be stormy today, for the sky is red and threatening.' You know how to interpret the appearance of the sky, but you cannot interpret the signs of the times.^{4}An evil and adulterous generation seeks for a sign, but no sign shall be given to it except the sign of Jonah."

== Commentary from the Church Fathers ==
Jerome: "Excellently is that said, and adulterous, seeing she has put away her husband, and, according to Ezekiel, has joined herself to many lovers."

Chrysostom: "Which also proves Him to be equal to the Father, if not to believe in Him makes them adulterous."

Rabanus Maurus: "Then He begins to answer them, giving them a sign not from heaven, which they were unworthy to see, but giving it them from the deep beneath. But to His own disciples He gave a sign from heaven, to whom He showed the glory of His blessed eternity both in a figure on the mount, and after in verity when He was taken up into heaven. Wherefore it follows, And there shall no sign he given it, but the sign of the Prophet Jonas."

Chrysostom: "For the signs He wrought were not in order to move them, for He knew that they were hard as stone, but for the profit of others. Or because they had not received it when He had given them a sign such as they now desired. And a sign was given them, when by their own punishment they learned His power. This He alludes to when He says, No sign shall he given it. As much as to say; I have shown you many mercies; yet none of these has brought you to honour My power, which you will then know when you shall behold your city thrown down upon the ground in punishment. In the mean time He brings in a saying concerning the Resurrection which they should after understand by those things that they should suffer; saying, Except the sign of the Prophet Jonas. For verily His Cross would not have been believed, unless it had had signs to testify to it. But if that were not believed, truly the Resurrection would not have been believed. For this reason also He calls this a sign, and brings forward a figure thereof, that the verity itself may be believed. It follows, As Jonas was three days and three nights in the belly of the whale,"

Rabanus Maurus: "He shows that the Jews were as criminal as the Ninevites, and that unless they repented they would be destroyed. But like as punishment was denounced against the Ninevites, and at the same time a remedy was set before them, so neither should the Jews despair of pardon, if at least after Christ’s resurrection they should do penitence. For Jonas, that is The Dove, or The mourner, is a sign of Him on whom the Holy Spirit descended in the form of a Dove, and who bare our sorrows. (Is. 53:4) The fish which swallowed Jonas in the sea, shows forth the death which Christ suffered in the world. Three days and nights was the one in the whale’s belly, the other in the tomb; the one was cast up on dry laud, the other arose in glory."

Preceded by Matthew 12:38	Gospel of Matthew; Chapter 12	Succeeded by Matthew 12:40
