= Papyrus 21 =

Papyrus 𝔓^{21}
- New Testament manuscript
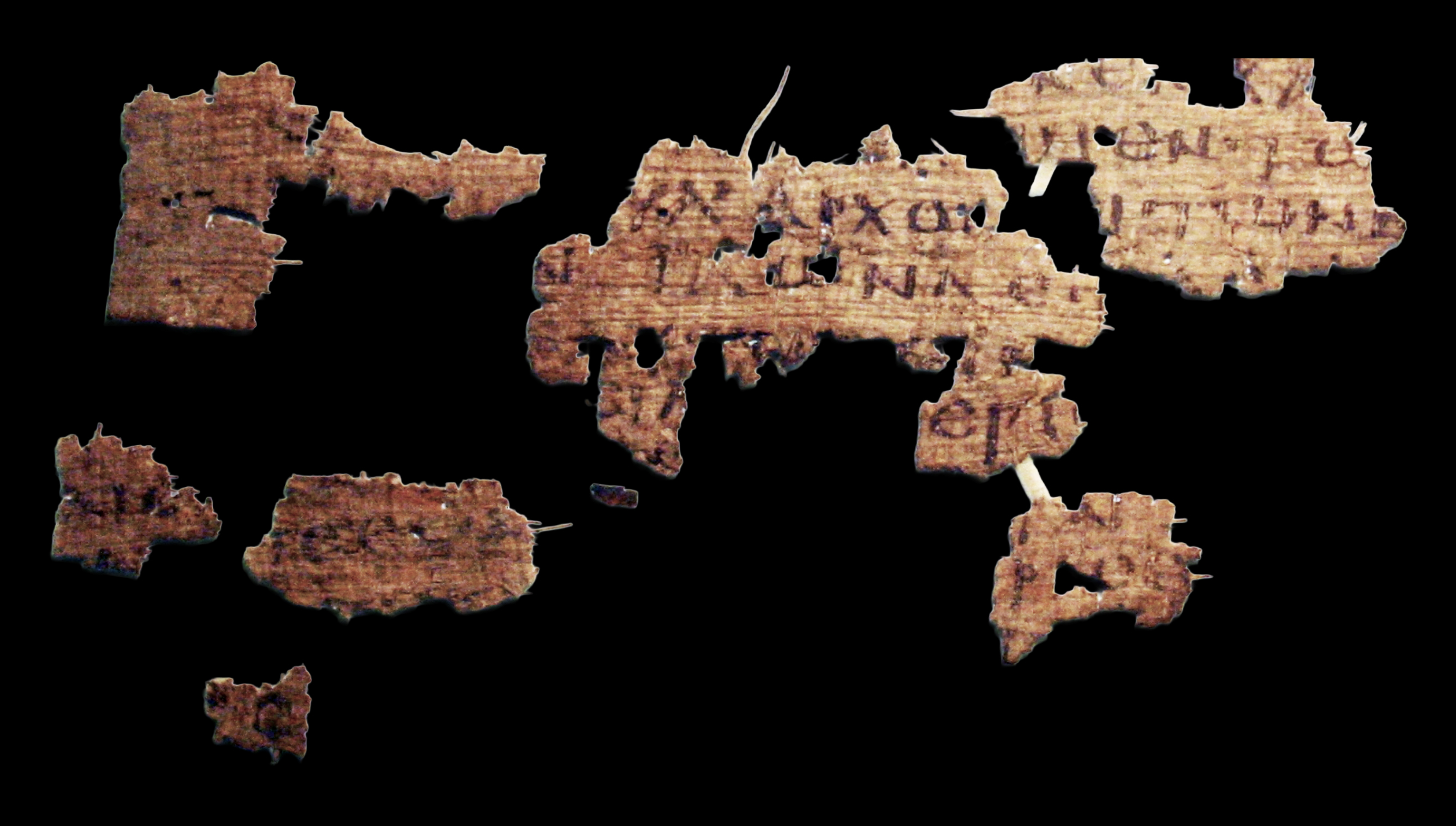
- Page recto with text of Matthew 12:24–26
- Name: P. Oxy. 1227
- Text: Matthew 12:24-33 †
- Date: 4th century
- Script: Greek
- Found: Egypt
- Now at: Muhlenberg College
- Cite: B. P. Grenfell & A. S. Hunt, Oxyrynchus Papyri X, pp. 12-14
- Size: 11.5 cm by 4.5 cm
- Type: mixed
- Category: III

Papyrus 21 (in the Gregory-Aland numbering), designated by siglum 𝔓^{21}, is an early copy of the New Testament in Greek. It is a papyrus manuscript of the Gospel of Matthew, it contains only Matthew 12:24–26.32–33. The manuscript paleographically had been assigned to the early 4th century.

== Description ==
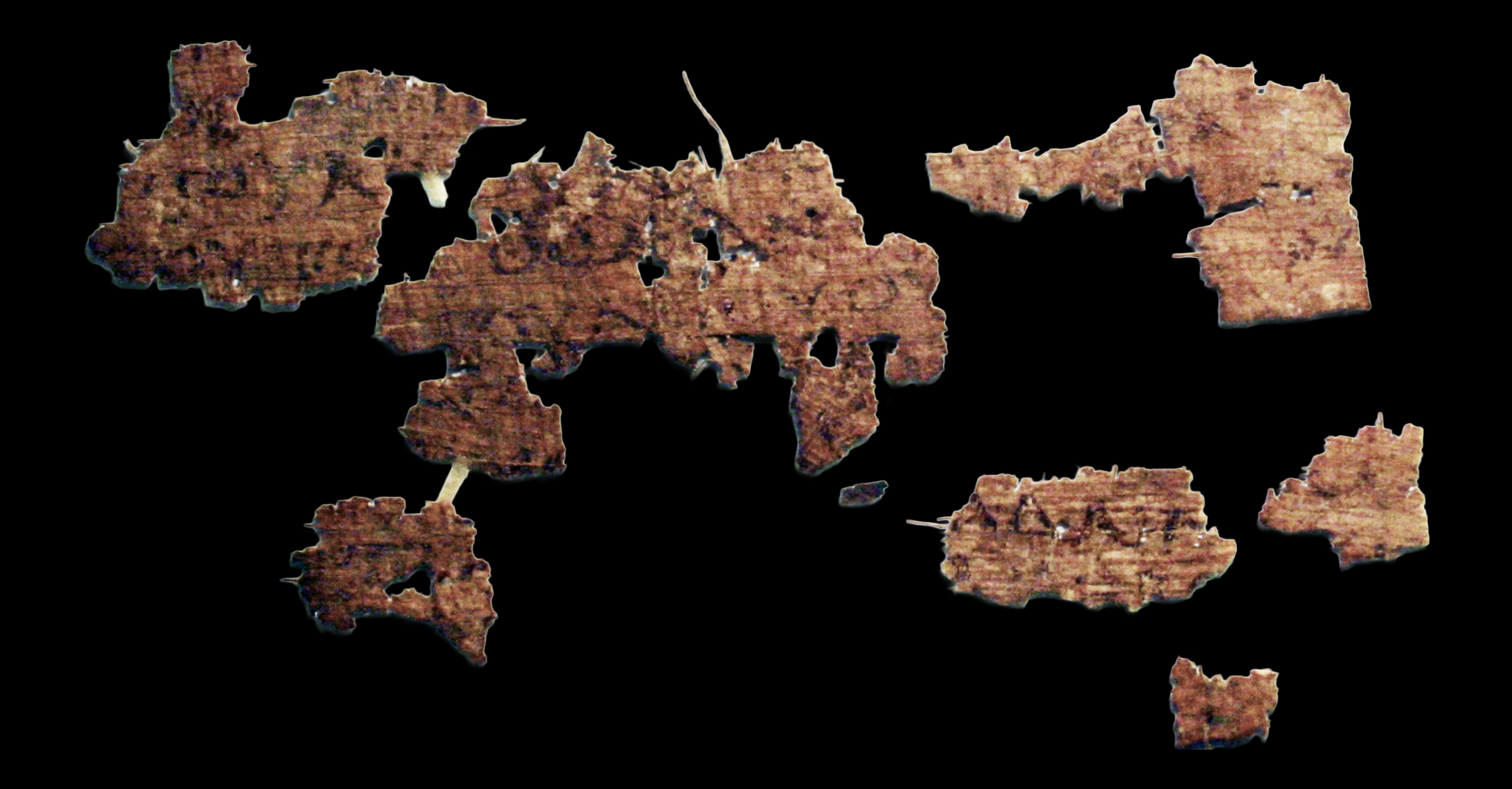
Verso Matthew 12, 32-33

The manuscript is written in large upright uncial letters.

The Greek text of this codex probably is a mixture of text-types. Aland placed it in Category III.

In Matthew 12:25 it has textual variant ιδων δε (instead of ειδως δε) in agreement with Codex Bezae, corrector b of the Codex Sinaiticus, 892*, the Latin text of Codex Bezae (it^{d}), k, c, s, cop^{bo}. In 12:32 it lacks words αυτω ουτε.

It is currently housed at the Muhlenberg College (Theol. Pap. 3) in Allentown (Pennsylvania).

== See also ==
- List of New Testament papyri
- Matthew 12
