= Matthew 12:31–32 =

Matthew 12:31-32
- ← 12:30 12:33 →
- Book: Gospel of Matthew
- Christian Bible part: New Testament

Matthew 12:31-32 are two verses in the twelfth chapter of the Gospel of Matthew in the New Testament.

== Content ==
In the original Greek according to Westcott-Hort, these verses are:

31:Διὰ τοῦτο λέγω ὑμῖν, Πᾶσα ἁμαρτία καὶ βλασφημία ἀφεθήσεται τοῖς ἀνθρώποις· ἡ δὲ τοῦ πνεύματος βλασφημία οὐκ ἀφεθήσεται τοῖς ἀνθρώποις.
32:Καὶ ὃς ἂν εἴπῃ λόγον κατὰ τοῦ υἱοῦ τοῦ ἀνθρώπου, ἀφεθήσεται αὐτῷ· ὃς δ᾿ ἂν εἴπῃ κατὰ τοῦ πνεύματος τοῦ ἁγίου, οὐκ ἀφεθήσεται αὐτῷ, οὔτε ἐν τούτῳ τῷ αἰῶνι οὔτε ἐν τῷ μέλλοντι.

In the King James Version of the Bible the text reads:

31:Wherefore I say unto you, All manner of sin and blasphemy shall be forgiven unto men: but the blasphemy against the Holy Ghost shall not be forgiven unto men.
32:And whosoever speaketh a word against the Son of man, it shall be forgiven him: but whosoever speaketh against the Holy Ghost, it shall not be forgiven him, neither in this world, neither in the world to come.

The New International Version translates the passage as:

31:And so I tell you, every sin and blasphemy will be forgiven men, but the blasphemy against the Spirit will not be forgiven.
32:Anyone who speaks a word against the Son of Man will be forgiven, but anyone who speaks against the Holy Spirit will not be forgiven, either in this age or in the age to come.

== Analysis ==
An important question is what is blasphemy? Many church fathers said that it was heresy, such as those who claim the Holy Spirit is not God. Others have postulated that it is Simony or schism. Still others say that it is every mortal sin committed after Baptism, that is, after the grace of the Holy Spirit has been received in Baptism. Most commonly quoted commentators have attributed the blasphemy against the Spirit to be defaming works such as casting out of devils which proceed from the goodness and holiness of God, and so are attributed to the Holy Ghost, who proceeds from the Father. Such also would be Love, Goodness, and Holiness. So when anyone speaks ill of such things, and knowingly, out of malice, ascribes them to an unclean spirit (as the Pharisees did), such a person is said to commit blasphemy against the Holy Ghost because they directly fight against God and take His holiness and purity from Him.

In The City of God, St. Augustine uses verse 32 to prove that there is a Purgatory after this life because it would be pointless to say, "shall not be forgiven… nor in the coming world," if there were no remission of sins in the coming world. As Lapide notes, "thus a person would speak vainly who said, I will never marry a wife, neither in this world, nor in the world to come, since no wife can be married in the world to come."

== Commentary from Church Fathers ==
Chrysostom: "The Lord had refuted the Pharisees by explaining His own actions, and He now proceeds to terrify them. For this is no small part of correction, to threaten punishment, as well as to set right false accusation."

Hilary of Poitiers: "He condemns by a most rigorous sentence this opinion of the Pharisees, and of such as thought with them, promising pardon for all sins, but refusing it to blasphemy against the Spirit; Wherefore I say unto you, All manner of sin and blasphemy shall be forgiven unto men."

Saint Remigius: "But it should be known that they are not forgiven to all men universally, but to such only as have performed due penitence for their guiltinesses. So by these words is overthrown the error of Novatian, who said that the faithful could not rise by penitence after a fall, nor merit pardon of their sins, especially they who in persecution denied."

Augustine: " For what difference does it make to the purpose, whether it be said, The spirit of blasphemy shall not be forgiven, or, Whose shall blaspheme against the Holy Spirit it shall not be forgiven him. (Luke 12:10) as Luke speaks; except that the same sense is expressed more clearly in the one place than in the other, the one Evangelist not overthrowing but explaining the other? The spirit of blasphemy it is said shortly, not expressing what spirit; to make which clear it is added, And whoso shall speak a word against the Son of man, it shall be forgiven him. After having said the same of all manner of blasphemy, He would in a more particular way speak of that blasphemy which is against the Son of Man, and which in the Gospel according to John He shows to be very heavy, where He says concerning the Holy Ghost, He shall convince the world of sin, of righteousness, and of judgment; of sin, because they believe not on me. That then which here follows, He who shall speak a word against the Holy Ghost, it shall not be forgiven him, neither in this world, nor in that which is to come, is not said because the Holy Spirit is in the Trinity greater than the Son, which no heretic ever affirmed."

Hilary of Poitiers: "And what is so beyond all pardon as to deny that in Christ which is of God, and to take away the substance of the Father’s Spirit which is in Him, seeing that He performs every work in the Spirit of God, and in Him God is reconciling the world unto Himself."

Jerome: "Or the passage may be thus understood; Whoso speaks a word against the Son of Man, as stumbling at My flesh, and thinking of Me as no more than man, such opinion and blasphemy though it is not free from the sin of heresy, yet finds pardon because of the little worth of the body. But whoso plainly perceiving the works of God, and being unable to deny the power of God, speaks falsely against them prompted by jealousy, and calls Christ who is the Word of God, and the works of the Holy Ghost, Beelzebub, to him it shall not be forgiven, neither in this world, nor in the world to come."

Augustine: " But if this were said in such manner, then every other kind of blasphemy is omitted, and that only which is spoken against the Son of Man, as when He is pronounced to be mere man, is to be forgiven. That then that is said, All manner of sin and blasphemy shall be forgiven unto men, without doubt blasphemy spoken against the Father is included in its largeness; though here again that alone is declared irremissible which is spoken against the Holy Ghost. What then, hath the Father also taken upon Him the form of a servant, that the Holy Ghost is thus as it were spoken of as greater? For who could not be convicted of having spoken a word against the Holy Spirit, before He become a Christian or a Catholic? First, the Pagans themselves when they say that Christ wrought miracles by magic arts, are they not like those who said that He cast out dæmons by the Prince of the dæmons? Likewise the Jews and all such heretics as confess the Holy Spirit, but deny that He is in the body of Christ, which is the Church Catholic, are like the Pharisees, who denied that the Holy Spirit was in Christ. Some heretics even contend that the Holy Spirit Himself is either a creature, as the Arians, Eunomians, and Macedonians, or deny Him at least in such sort that they may deny the Trinity in the Godhead; others assert that the Father alone is God, and the same is sometimes spoken of as the Son, sometimes as the Holy Spirit, as the Sabellians. The Photinians also say, that the Father only is God, and that the Son is nothing more than a man, and deny altogether that there is any third Person, the Holy Spirit. It is clear then that the Holy Spirit is blasphemed, both by Pagans, Jews, and heretics.

Augustine: " Otherwise, The Apostle John says, There is a sin unto death; I do not say that he shall pray for it. This sin of the brother unto death I judge to be, when any one having come to the knowledge of God, through the grace of our Lord Jesus Christ, opposes Himself against the brotherhood, or is roused by the fury of jealousy against that grace by which he was reconciled to God. (1 John 5:16) The stain of this sin is so great, that it may not submit to the humility of prayer, even when the sinful conscience is driven to acknowledge and proclaim its own sin. Which state of mind because of the greatness of their sin we must suppose some may be brought to; and this perhaps may be to sin against the Holy Ghost, that is through malice and jealousy to assail brotherly charity after having received the grace of the Holy Spirit; and this sin the Lord declares shall be forgiven neither in this world, nor in that to come. Whence it may be enquired whether the Jews sinned this sin against the Holy Ghost when they said that the Lord cast out dæmons by Beelzebub the Prince of the dæmons. Are we to suppose this spoken of our Lord Himself, because He said in another place, If they have called the master of the house Beelzebub, how much more they of his household? (Mat. 10:24)

Augustine: " But I do not affirm this for certain, by saying that I think thus; yet thus much might have been added; If he should close this life in this impious hardness of heart, yet since we may not utterly despair of any however evil, so long as he is in this life, so neither is it unreasonable to pray for him of whom we do not despair."

Augustine: " Yet is this enquiry very mysterious. Let us then seek the light of exposition from the Lord. I say unto you, beloved, that in all Holy Scripture there is not perhaps so great or so difficult a question as this. First then I request you to note that the Lord said not, Every blasphemy against the Spirit shall not be forgiven, nor, Whoso shall speak any word against—but, Whoso shall speak the word. Wherefore it is not necessary to think that every blasphemy and every word spoken against the Holy Spirit shall be without pardon; it is only necessary that there be some word which if spoken against the Holy Spirit shall be without pardon. For such is the manner of Scripture, that when any thing is so declared in it as that it is not declared whether it is said of the whole, or a part, it is not necessary that because it can apply to the whole, it therefore is not to be understood of the part. As when the Lord said to the Jews, If I had not come and spoken unto them, they had not had sin, (John 15:22) this does not mean that the Jews would have been altogether without sin, but that there was a sin they would not have had, if Christ had not come. What then is this manner of speaking against the Holy Ghost, comes now to be explained. Now in the Father is represented to us the Author of all things, in the Son birth, in the Holy Spirit community of the Father and the Son. What then is common to the Father and the Son, through that they would have us have communion among ourselves and with them; The love of God is shed abroad in our hearts by the Holy Ghost which he hath given us, (Rom. 5:5) and because by our sins we were alienated, from the possession of true goods, Charity shall cover the multitude of sins. (1 Pet. 4:8) And for that Christ forgives sins through the Holy Spirit, hence may be understood how, when He said to his disciples, Receive ye the Holy Spirit, (John 20:22) He subjoined straight, Whosesoever sins ye forgive, they shall be forgiven them.

Chrysostom: "Otherwise according to the first exposition. The Jews were indeed ignorant of Christ, but of the Holy Ghost they had had a sufficient communication, for the Prophets spake by Him. What He here saith then is this; Be it that ye have stumbled at Me because of the flesh which is around Me; but can ye in the same manner say of the Holy Spirit, We know Him not? Wherefore this blasphemy cannot be forgiven you, and ye shall be punished both here and hereafter, for since to cast out dæmons and to heal diseases are of the Holy Spirit, you do not speak evil against Me only, but also against Him; and so your condemnation is inevitable both here and hereafter. For there are who are punished in this life only; as they who among the Corinthians were unworthy partakers of the mysteries; others who are punished only in the life to come, as the rich man in hell; but those here spoken of are to be punished both in this world, and in the world to come, as were the Jews, who suffered horrible things in the taking of Jerusalem, and shall there undergo most heavy punishment."

Glossa Ordinaria: " This passage destroys that heresy of Origen, who asserted that after many ages all sinners should obtain pardon; for it is here said, this shall not be forgiven either in this world, or in the world to come."

Gregory the Great: " Hence we may gather that there are some sins that are remitted in this world, and some in the world to come; for what is denied of one sin, must be supposed to be admitted of others. And this may be believed in the case of trifling faults; such as much idle discourse, immoderate laughter, or the sin of carefulness in our worldly affairs, which indeed can hardly be managed without sin even by one who knows how he ought to avoid sin; or sins through ignorance (if they be lesser sins) which burden us even after death, if they have not been remitted to us while yet in this life. But it should be known that none will there obtain any purgation even of the least sin, but he who by good actions has merited the same in this life."

== Uses ==
- Both verses are quoted in the chapter 26 of Didascalia Apostolorum (230 AD).

Preceded by Matthew 12:30	Gospel of Matthew; Chapter 12	Succeeded by Matthew 12:33
