= You are either with us, or against us =

Political rhetoric

In political communication, the phrase "you are either with us, or against us" and similar variations are used to generate polarisation and reject non-partisanship. The implied consequence of not joining the partisan effort of the speaker is to be deemed an enemy. A contemporary example is the statement of former US President George W. Bush, who declared at the launch of his anti-terrorism campaign, "Every nation, in every region, now has a decision to make. Either you are with us, or you are with the terrorists."

== Background ==
The statement generally is a descriptive statement identifying the beliefs of the speakers, and thus state a basic assumption, not a logical conclusion. It may also be interpreted as a speech act. Sometimes it is interpreted as a splitting or a false dilemma, which is an informal fallacy.

Some see the statement as a way of persuading others to choose sides in a conflict which does not allow the position of neutrality. Only when there are no alternatives like a middle ground does the phrase hold validity as a logical conclusion. The phrases are a form of argumentation.

== Ancient examples ==
- From the Book of Joshua (Chap. 5:13): "It happened, when Joshua was by Jericho, that he lifted up his eyes and looked, and behold, a man stood in front of him with his sword drawn in his hand. Joshua went to him, and said to him, 'Are you for us, or for our adversaries?'" (The one he was talking to answers, "Neither".)
- According to The Constitution of Athens by Aristotle, "since [Solon] saw the state often engaged in internal disputes, while many of the citizens from sheer indifference accepted whatever might turn up, he made a law with express reference to such persons, enacting that any one who, in a time [of] civil factions, did not take up arms with either party, should lose his rights as a citizen and cease to have any part in the state."
- The Synoptic Gospels attribute the following quote to Jesus: "Whoever is not with Me is against Me, and whoever does not gather with Me scatters" (Matthew 12:30; Luke 11:23), as well as the converse statement, "Whoever is not against us is for us" (Luke 9:50; Mark 9:40).
- Marcus Tullius Cicero, in an oration before Julius Caesar in 46 BC, published as Pro Ligario, made the following distinction: "For we heard you say that we looked upon all as enemies that were not with us; but that you looked upon all as friends that were not against you."

== 20th-century examples ==
- Vladimir Ilyich Lenin, in a speech discussing the Chief Committee for Political Education, told the assembled delegates that "It is with absolute frankness that we speak of this struggle of the proletariat; each man must choose between joining our side or the other side. Any attempt to avoid taking sides in this issue must end in fiasco."
- George Orwell wrote in his 1942 essay "Pacifism and the War", "If you hamper the war effort of one side you automatically help that of the other. Nor is there any real way of remaining outside such a war as the present one. In practice, 'he that is not with me is against me'. The idea that you can somehow remain aloof from and superior to the struggle, while living on food which British sailors have to risk their lives to bring you, is a bourgeois illusion bred of money and security."
- Benito Mussolini declared in speeches across fascist Italy: "O con noi o contro di noi"—You're either with us or against us.
- János Kádár instead used the non-polarising converse, in an effort to unite Hungary after the Hungarian Revolution of 1956. He announced in December 1961, "those who are not against us are with us."

== 21st-century examples ==
- Hillary Clinton said on 13 September 2001: "Every nation has to either be with us, or against us. Those who harbor terrorists, or who finance them, are going to pay a price."
- President George W. Bush, in an address to a joint session of Congress on 20 September 2001 said, "Every nation, in every region, now has a decision to make. Either you are with us, or you are with the terrorists."
- Vic Toews, Canadian Public Safety Minister, said on 13 February 2012: "... either stand with us or with the child pornographers" in response to questions from Quebec MP Francis Scarpaleggia (Lac-Saint-Louis) regarding extensive Privacy Commission concerns about 'warrant-less access' to all Canadian Internet and Cell phone accounts under the proposed legislation contained in bill C-30 "Protecting Children from Internet Predators Act" introduced the following day (14 February 2012) in the House of Commons of Canada.
- Sarah Palin, in a speech criticizing Republicans who didn't support Donald Trump's 2016 election campaign, said: "You're either with us or you're against us. That gang, they call themselves Never hashtag, whatever, I just call 'em Republicans Against Trump, or RAT for short..."
- Pennsylvania House Rep. Jordan A. Harris, on 21 June 2020, said, "[R]acism is not a gray area for me. You are either with us or against us."

== Fictional examples ==
- Towards the end of Joseph Heller's Catch-22, Colonels Korn and Cathcart equate fighting for their country with fighting for the benefit of the two of them. Korn tells the protagonist Yossarian: "You're either for us or against your country. It's as simple as that." A reviewer of Catch-22 found this "flawless" logical indulgence by the commanding colonels to be comparable to Heller's parody of Charles Erwin Wilson's statement, often paraphrased as, "What's good for General Motors is good for the country".
- In the film Star Wars: Episode III - Revenge of the Sith, Anakin Skywalker tells Obi-Wan Kenobi that "If you are not with me, then you are my enemy", which has been interpreted as a reference to the statement on terrorism made by President Bush.
- Russell Hantz frequently uses a variation of the line, "You're either with me or against me," as an intimidation tactic towards his competition and fellow allies in Survivor: Heroes vs. Villains, the twentieth edition of the show. Sandra Diaz-Twine bluntly replies, "I'm against you, Russell."
- In the episode Point of No Return (season 3 episode 9), of J. Michael Straczynski's science fiction series Babylon 5, the leader (played by Vaughn Armstrong) of the Night Watch, a fascist organisation that attempts to take control of station security after the declaration of martial law, says "And we need to know where everybody stands. Are you with us or against us?"

== See also ==
- Neutrality
- Principle of bivalence
- Thought-terminating cliché
- Incitement to genocide#Target–sympathizer conflation
- Matthew 12:30
