= Matthew 12 =

- ← chapter 11 chapter 13 →
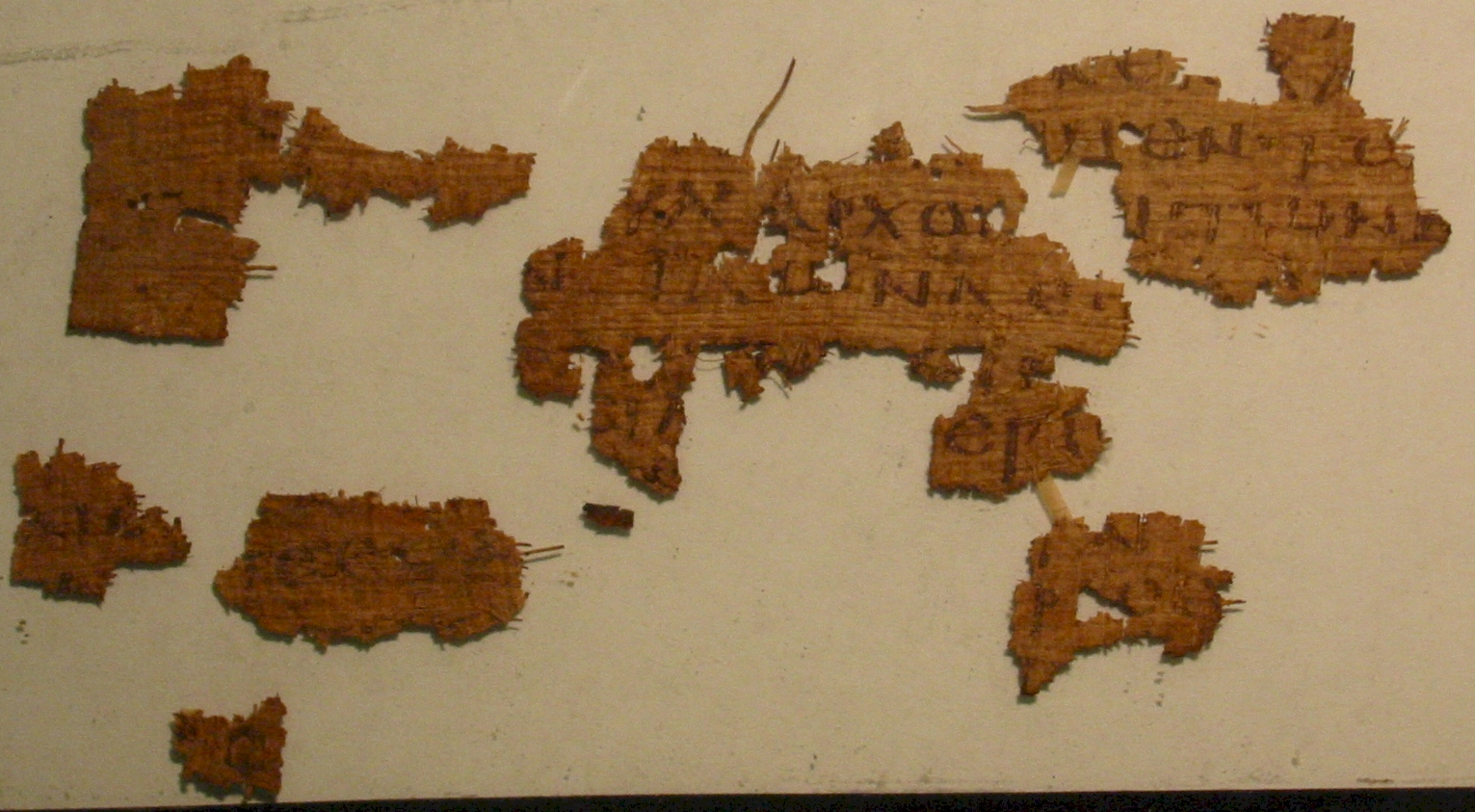
- Gospel of Matthew 12:24–26 on Papyrus 21, from 3rd century
- Book: Gospel of Matthew
- Category: Gospel
- Christian Bible part: New Testament
- Order in the Christian part: 1

Matthew 12 is the twelfth chapter in the Gospel of Matthew in the New Testament section of the Christian Bible. It continues the narrative about Jesus' ministry in Galilee and introduces controversy over the observance of the Sabbath for the first time.

== Text ==
The original text was written in Koine Greek. This chapter is divided into 50 verses.

=== Textual witnesses ===
Some early manuscripts containing the text of this chapter are:

- Papyrus 21 (3rd century; extant verses 24–26, 32–33)
- Papyrus 70 (3rd century; extant verses 26–27)
- Codex Vaticanus (325–350)
- Codex Sinaiticus (330–360; complete)
- Codex Bezae (~400)
- Codex Washingtonianus (~400)
- Codex Ephraemi Rescriptus (~450; complete)
- Codex Purpureus Rossanensis (6th century)
- Codex Petropolitanus Purpureus (6th century; extant verses 1–39)

== Structure ==
This chapter can be grouped (with cross references to other biblical passages):

- Matthew 12:1–8 = Lord of the Sabbath (Mark 2:23–28; Luke 6:1–5)
- Matthew 12:9–14 = Healing the man with a withered hand (Mark 3:1–6; Luke 6:6–11)
- Matthew 12:15–21 = The Chosen Servant (Isaiah 42)
- Matthew 12:22–28 = Exorcising the blind and mute man (Mark 3:20–26; Luke 11:14–20)
- Matthew 12:29 = Parable of the strong man (Mark 3:27; Luke 11:21–22)
- Matthew 12:30 = Those not with me are against me (Mark 9)
- Matthew 12:31–32 = Unforgivable sin (Mark 3:28–30;Luke 11:23)
- Matthew 12:33–37 = The Tree and its Fruits (Luke 6:43–45)
- Matthew 12:38–42 = Request for a sign (Luke 11:29–32; Jonah 2:1)
- Matthew 12:43–45 = The Return of the Unclean Spirit (Luke 11:24–26)
- Matthew 12:46–50 = Jesus' true relatives (Mark 3:31–35; Luke 8:19–21)

== Verse 1 ==
At that time Jesus went through the grainfields on the sabbath; his disciples were hungry, and they began to pluck heads of grain and to eat.

German Protestant theologian Heinrich Meyer notes that there was no accusation of trespass or theft here: "any one was allowed to pluck ... ears of corn in another man’s field till he was satisfied" in accordance with Deuteronomy 23:25:

If you go into your neighbour’s standing grain, you may pluck the ears with your hand, but you shall not put a sickle to your neighbour’s standing grain.

The Mosaic law left it unclear whether such licence was authorised on the Sabbath. Both Mark and Luke raise the controversy about the sabbath earlier in their respective gospels (Mark 2:23–27 and Luke 6:1–11).

== Fulfillment of the Servant Song of Isaiah ==
Matthew states that Jesus' withdrawal from the cities of Galilee and his request that the crowds not make him known is a fulfillment of the first Servant Song of the prophet Isaiah. The verses quoted from Isaiah are from the Septuagint version of Isaiah 42:1–4. One difference from the Hebrew version is found in verse 21 (Isaiah 42:4).

In translation from the Hebrew version, this reads:

and the coastlands shall wait for His law

In the Septuagint and in Matthew's Gospel this reads:

and in his name shall the Gentiles trust.

=== Verses 17–21 ===
^{17} that it might be fulfilled which was spoken by Isaiah the prophet, saying:

^{18} "Behold! My Servant whom I have chosen,
My Beloved in whom My soul is well pleased!
I will put My Spirit upon Him,
And He will declare justice to the Gentiles.
^{19} He will not quarrel nor cry out,
Nor will anyone hear His voice in the streets.
^{20} A bruised reed He will not break,
And smoking flax He will not quench,
Till He sends forth justice to victory;
^{21} And in His name Gentiles will trust."

== Careless or idle words ==
Dale Allison associates the references to "idle" words in verses 36 and 37 with the earlier references to blasphemy in verse 31, and sees Jesus as refuting the suggestion that blasphemy "cannot really have eternal consequence because it consists of nothing but words".

=== Verse 36 ===
But I say to you that for every idle word men may speak, they will give account of it in the day of judgment.

Theologian Albert Barnes describes an "idle word" as literally "a vain, thoughtless, useless word; a word that accomplishes no good", but states that in the context the meaning is "wicked, injurious, false [or] malicious" words. The Greek reveals a contrast between ρημα αργον, rhēma argon, idle words or sounds, and the consequential need to ἀποδώσουσιν περὶ αὐτοῦ λόγον, apodōsousin peri autou logon, to provide a reasoned account on the day of judgment.

=== Verse 37 ===
For by your words you will be justified, and by your words you will be condemned.

Arthur Carr, in the Cambridge Bible for Schools and Colleges, notes the connection between words and character. W. R. Nicoll contrasts this verse with Matthew 25:31–46, where justification turns on actions: for I was hungry and you gave Me food ... He sees chapter 3 of James's epistle as an extension of this verse.

== See also ==
- Jonah
- Servant songs
- Sheba
- Solomon
- Related Bible parts: Deuteronomy 23, 1 Kings 10, 2 Chronicles 9, Isaiah 42, Isaiah 53, Jonah 1, Matthew 16, Mark 2, Mark 3, Luke 6, Luke 8, Luke 11
