= Matthew 12:49–50 =

Matthew 12:49-50
- ← 12:48 13:1 →
- Book: Gospel of Matthew
- Christian Bible part: New Testament

Matthew 12:49-50 are verses in the twelfth chapter of the Gospel of Matthew in the New Testament.

== Content ==
In the original Greek according to Westcott-Hort, these verses are:

49: Καὶ ἐκτείνας τὴν χεῖρα αὐτοῦ ἐπὶ τοὺς μαθητὰς αὐτοῦ εἶπεν, Ἰδού, ἡ μήτηρ μου καὶ οἱ ἀδελφοί μου.
50: Ὅστις γὰρ ἂν ποιήσῃ τὸ θέλημα τοῦ πατρός μου τοῦ ἐν οὐρανοῖς, αὐτός μου ἀδελφὸς καὶ ἀδελφὴ καὶ μήτηρ ἐστίν.

In the King James Version of the Bible the text reads:

49: And he stretched forth his hand toward his disciples, and said, Behold my mother and my brethren!
50: For whosoever shall do the will of my Father which is in heaven, the same is my brother, and sister, and mother.

The New International Version translates the passage as:

49: Pointing to his disciples, he said, "Here are my mother and my brothers.
50: For whoever does the will of my Father in heaven is my brother and sister and mother."

== Analysis ==
Even though only brothers of Christ are mentioned as inquiring after him, he points out that anyone can become a brother or sister of him spiritually by doing his will.

== Commentary from the Church Fathers ==
Gregory the Great: "The Lord designed to call faithful disciples His brethren, saying, Go, tell my brethren. Since then a man may be made a brother of the Lord by coming to the faith, it should be enquired how one may become also His mother. Be it known by us then, that he that by believing is made brother or sister of Christ, becomes His mother by preaching; for in pouring Him into the heart of the hearer, he may be said to beget the Lord; and he is made the Lord’s mother, when by his word love of the Lord is begotten in the mind of his neighbour."

Chrysostom: "And besides what has been said, He taught also somewhat more, namely, that we should not neglect virtue relying on any kindred. For if it profited His mother nothing that she was such, if she had not had virtue, who is there that shall be saved by his kindred? For there is one only nobility, to do the will of God, and therefore it follows, Whoso shall do the will of my Father which is in heaven, the same is my brother, and sister, and mother. Many women have blessed that holy Virgin and her womb, and have desired to be made such mothers. What is it then that hinders? Behold, He hath set before you a broad way, and not women only, but men likewise, may become the mother of God."

Jerome: "Let us also expound in another way. The Saviour is speaking to the multitude—that is, He teaches the Gentiles the inward mysteries; His mother and His brethren, that is the synagogue and the Jewish people, stand without."

Hilary of Poitiers: "Although they had like the rest power to come in, yet they abstain from all approach to Him, for he came unto his own, and his own received him not. (John 1:11.)"

Gregory the Great: "Thus also His mother is declared to stand without, as though she was not acknowledged, because the synagogue is therefore not acknowledged by its Author, because it held to the observance of the Law, and having lost the spiritual discernment thereof, kept itself without to guard the letter."

Jerome: "And when they shall have asked and enquired, and sent a messenger, they shall receive for answer, that their will is free, and that they can enter in, if they will believe."

Preceded by Matthew 12:49	Gospel of Matthew; Chapter 12	Succeeded by Matthew 13:1
