= Matthew 12:48 =

- ← 12:47 12:49 →
- Book: Gospel of Matthew
- Christian Bible part: New Testament

Matthew 12:48 is the 48th verse in the twelfth chapter of the Gospel of Matthew in the New Testament.

== Content ==
In the original Greek according to Westcott-Hort, this verse is:

Ὁ δὲ ἀποκριθεὶς εἶπε τῷ εἰπόντι αὐτῷ, Τίς ἐστιν ἡ μήτηρ μου; Καὶ τίνες εἰσὶν οἱ ἀδελφοί μου;

In the King James Version of the Bible the text reads:

But he answered and said unto him that told him, Who is my mother? and who are my brethren?

The New International Version translates the passage as:

He replied to him, "Who is my mother, and who are my brothers?"

== Analysis ==
It is said that Christ says this not to deny that he really had a mother nor because he were ashamed of his mother and brothers, but because this messenger was interrupting him with too great boldness, and interrupting his preaching, which was more concerned with his father, than upon his affection for his mother.

== Commentary from the Church Fathers ==
Chrysostom: "For He said not, Go and say unto her, She is not My mother, but continues His discourse to him that had brought Him word; as it follows; But he answered and said unto him that told him, Who is my mother? and who are my brethren?"

Hilary of Poitiers: "And He cannot be held to have thought meanly of His mother, seeing that in His passion He evinced the most extreme carefulness for her."

Chrysostom: "But had He desired to disown His mother, He would have done it at the time when the Jews cast His birth in His teeth."

Jerome: "He did not then, as Marcion and Manichæus say, disown His mother, so as to be thought to be born of a phantasm, but He preferred His Apostles to His kindred, that we also in a comparison of our affections should set the spirit before the flesh."

Ambrose: "(in Luc. 8:21.) Nor does He overthrow the duty of filial submission, which is conveyed in the command, Honour thy father and thy mother, (Ex. 20:12.) but shows that He owes more to the mysteries and relationship of His Father, than of His mother; as it follows, And stretching out his hand to his disciples, he said, Behold my mother and my brethren."

Preceded by Matthew 12:47	Gospel of Matthew; Chapter 12	Succeeded by Matthew 12:49
