= Sea of Galilee Boat =

Ancient fishing boat from the 1st century AD

Coordinates: 32°50′39.52″N 35°31′30.64″E

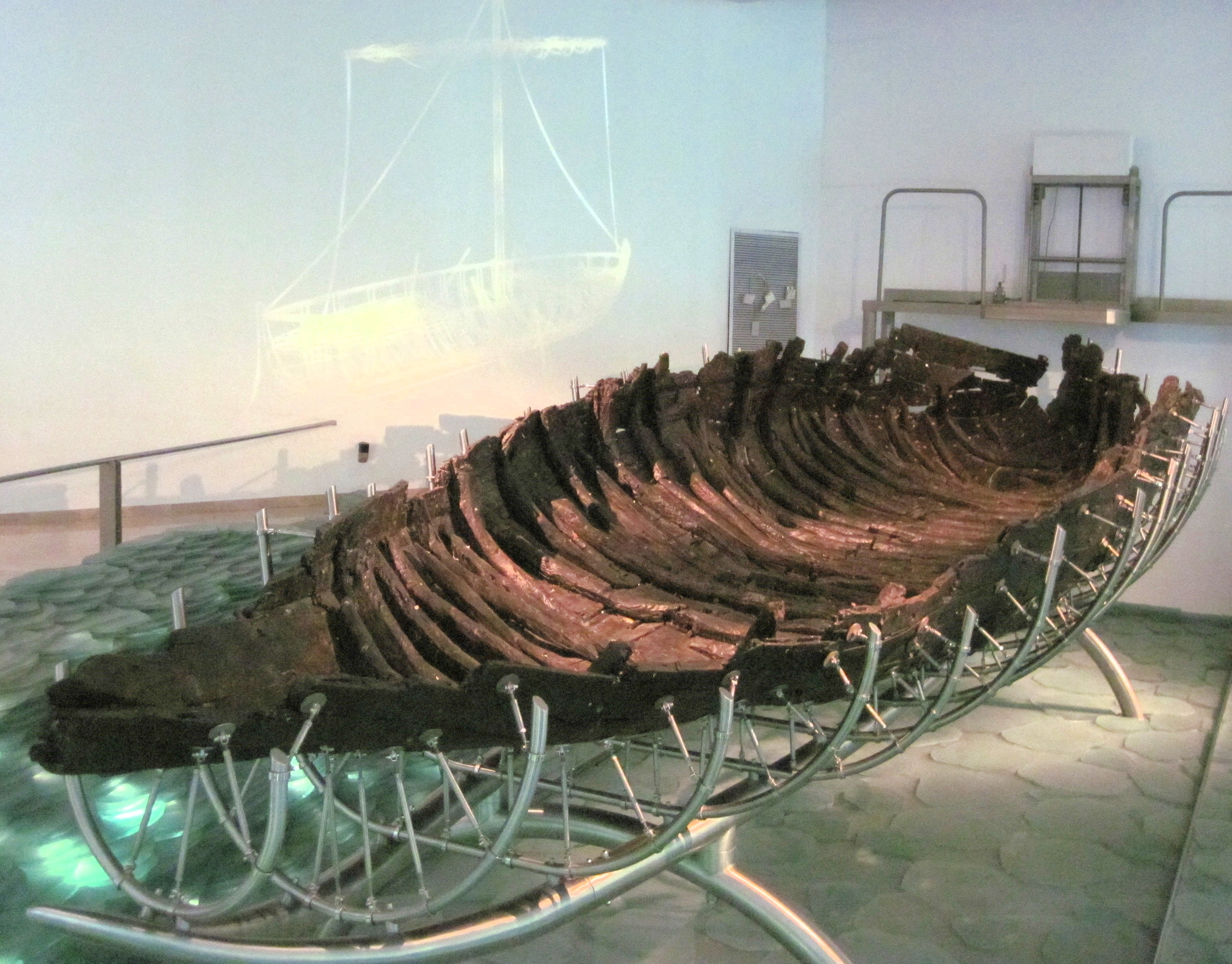
The 'Ancient Galilee Boat' housed in the Yigal Allon Museum in Kibbutz Ginosar

The Ancient Galilee Boat, also known as the Jesus Boat, is an ancient fishing boat from the 1st century AD, discovered in 1986 on the north-west shore of the Sea of Galilee in Israel. The remains of the boat, 27 feet (8.2 meters) long, 7.5 feet (2.3 meters) wide and with a maximum preserved height of 4.3 feet (1.3 meters), first appeared during a drought, when the waters of the Sea (actually a great fresh-water lake) receded. Other than the dating, there is no evidence connecting the boat to Jesus or his disciples.

== Discovery and excavation ==
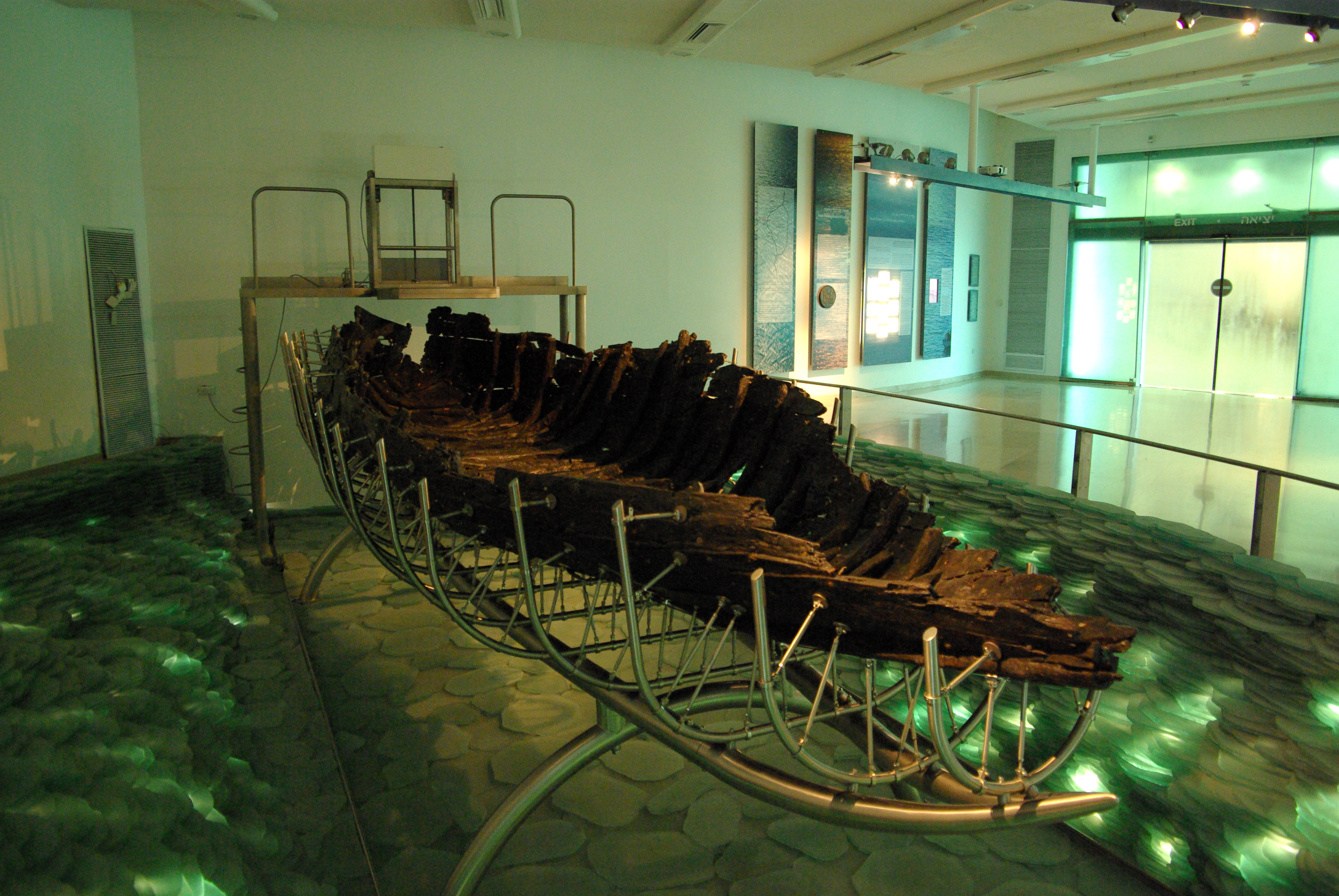
The boat on display in its special climatised museum hall

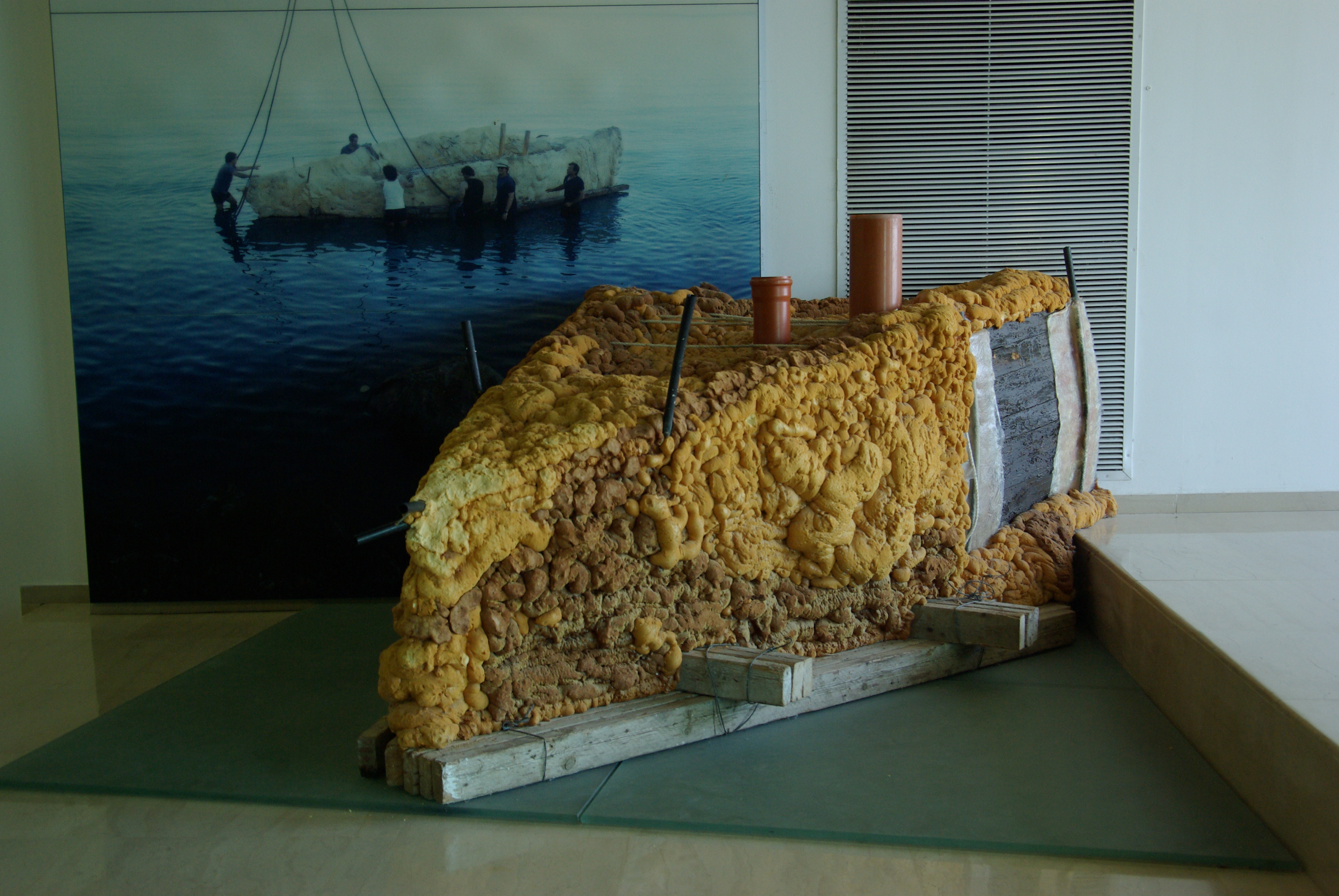
Part of the insulating foam coating used to float and rescue the boat

The remains of the Ancient Galilee Boat were found by brothers Moshe and Yuval Lufan, fishermen from Kibbutz Ginnosar. The brothers were keen amateur archaeologists with an interest in discovering artifacts from Israel's past. When drought reduced the water-level of the lake, the two brothers examined the newly exposed beach and stumbled across the remains of the boat buried in the shore.

The brothers reported their discovery to the authorities who sent out a team of archaeologists to investigate. The team realised that the remains of the boat were of tremendous historical importance to Jews and Christians alike, and so an archaeological dig followed, undertaken by members of Kibbutz Ginosar, the Israel Antiquities Authority, and numerous volunteers. Rumour spread that the boat was full of gold and the dig had to be guarded night and day. Excavating the boat from the mud without damaging it, quickly enough to extract it before the water rose again, was a difficult process which lasted 12 days and nights. The ancient wood was extremely fragile when exposed to the atmosphere and the boat had to be rescued from the place it was found by wrapping it in a mantle of fiberglass and insulating foam, which helped with both keeping it together, and floating it to its new location. It was then submerged in a wax bath for 12 years, which protected the boat before it could be displayed at the Yigal Allon Galilee Boat Museum in Kibbutz Ginosar.

== Physical parameters ==
The boat's construction conforms to other boats built in that part of the Mediterranean during the period between 100 BC and 200 AD. Constructed primarily of cedar planks joined by pegged mortise and tenon joints and nails, the boat is shallow drafted with a flat bottom, allowing it to get very close to the shore while fishing. However, the boat is composed of ten different wood types, suggesting either a wood shortage or that the boat was made of scrap wood and had undergone extensive and repeated fixes. The boat was row-able, with four staggered rowers, and also had a mast allowing the fishermen to sail the boat.

== Dating the boat ==
The boat has been dated to 40 BC (plus or minus 80 years) based on radiocarbon dating, and 50 BC to 50 AD based on pottery (including a cooking pot and lamp) and nails found in the boat, as well as hull construction techniques. The evidence of repeated repairs shows the boat was used for several decades, perhaps nearly a century. When its fishermen owners thought it was beyond repair, they removed all useful wooden parts and the hull eventually sank to the bottom of the lake. There it was covered with mud, which prevented bacterial decomposition.

== Historical importance ==
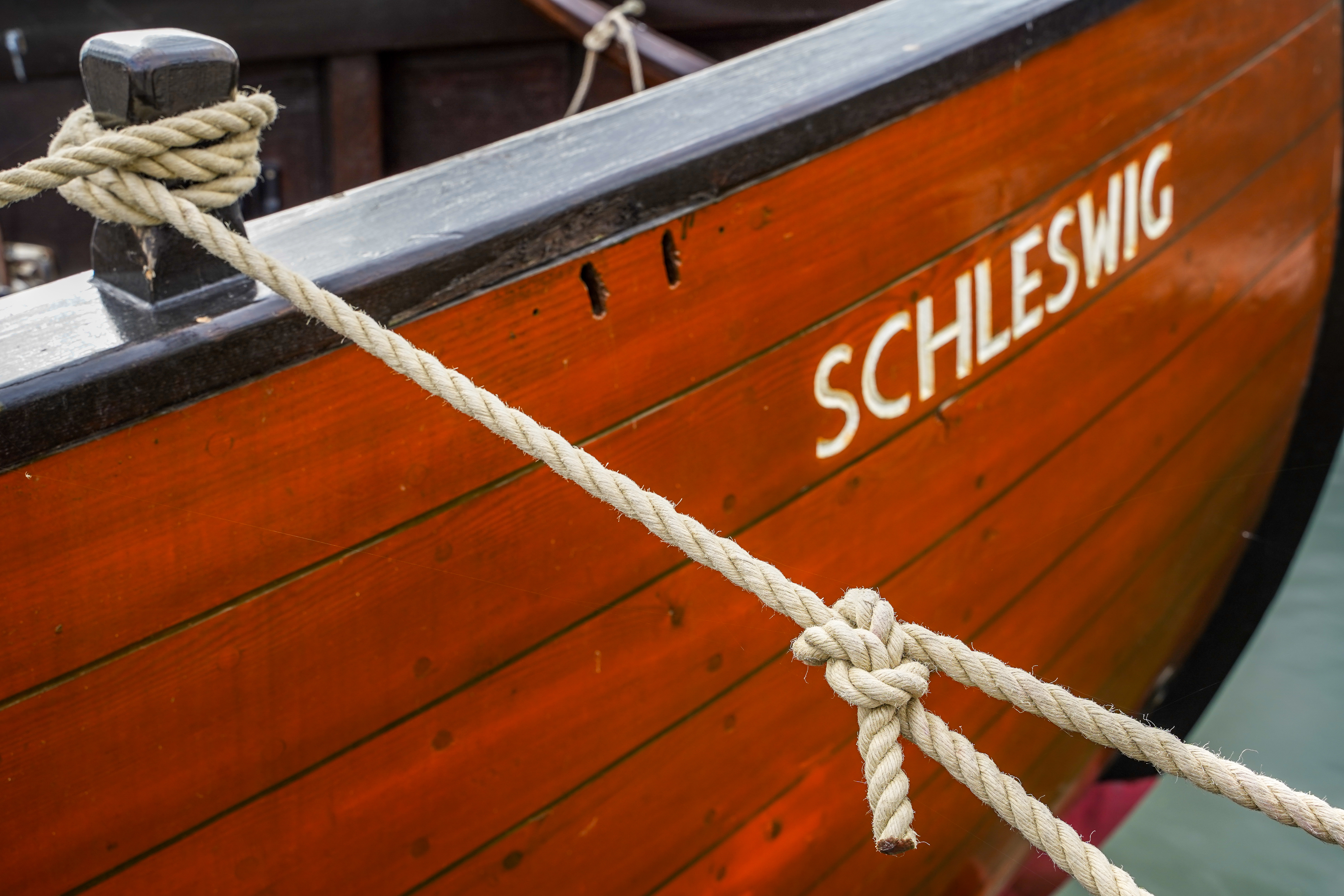
Remake by Bible Society Schleswig

The Galilee Boat is historically important to the people of Israel as an example of the type of boat used by their ancestors in the 1st century for both fishing and transportation across the lake. Previously only references made by Roman authors, the Bible and mosaics had provided archaeologists insight into the construction of these types of vessels.

The boat is also important to Christians because this was the sort of boat used by Jesus and his disciples, several of whom were fishermen. Boats such as this played a large role in Jesus' life and ministry, and are mentioned 50 times in the Gospels, though there is no evidence connecting the Sea of Galilee Boat itself directly to Jesus or his disciples.

A replica of the Jesus Boat exists at the Lednica lake, Poland, constructed in Prudnik by boatbuilders from Pomerania and the Franciscan Dr. Antoni Dudek.

== See also ==
- List of surviving ancient ships
- Mendel Nun of Kibbutz Ein Gev, expert on the history and archaeology of the Sea of Galilee, founder of the House of Anchors Fishing Museum (1995)
- Jesus preaches in a ship
- Polyethylene glycol, chemical used to preserve the boat's wood

Ships whose preservation helped gain expertise for the Galilee Boat

- Vasa (ship), salvaged in 1961
- Mary Rose, salvaged in the 1970s - early 1980s and 2002-2005

Contemporary fishing towns on the lake

- Bethsaida, mentioned in the Gospels
- Capernaum, mentioned in the Gospels
- Dalmanutha, possibly the name of the ancient town on whose shore the boat was found
- Magdala, where a mosaic depicting a similar boat was discovered
