= Codex Vaticanus =

4th-century Bible manuscript in Greek

Uncial 03
- New Testament manuscript
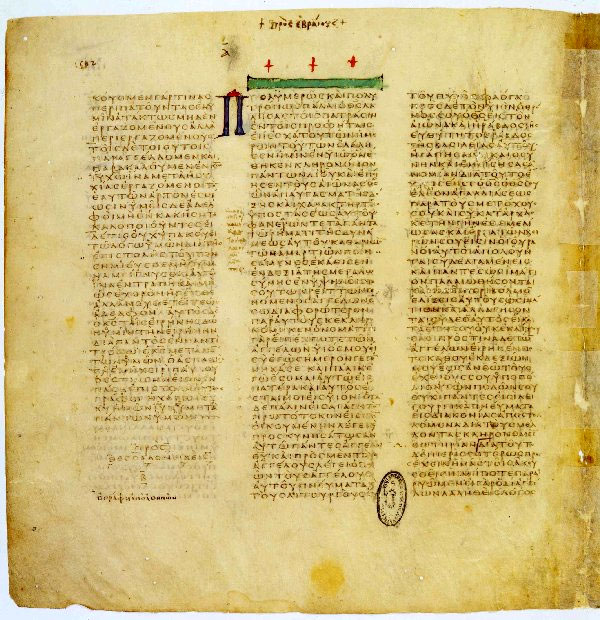
- Page from Codex Vaticanus; ending of 2 Thes and beginning of Heb
- Name: Vaticanus
- Sign: B
- Text: Greek Old Testament and Greek New Testament
- Date: c. 300-350AD
- Script: Greek
- Now at: Vatican Library
- Cite: C. Vercellonis, J. Cozza, Bibliorum Sacrorum Graecus Codex Vaticanus, Roma 1868.
- Size: 27 × 27 cm (10.6 × 10.6 in)
- Type: Alexandrian text-type
- Category: I
- Note: very close to 𝔓^{66}, 𝔓^{75}, 0162

The Codex Vaticanus is a manuscript of the Greek Bible, containing the majority of the Greek Old Testament and the majority of the New Testament. It is designated by the siglum B or 03 in the Gregory-Aland numbering of New Testament manuscripts, and as δ 1 in the von Soden numbering of New Testament manuscripts. It is one of the four great uncial codices. Along with Codex Alexandrinus and Codex Sinaiticus, it is one of the earliest and most complete manuscripts of the Bible. Using the study of comparative writing styles (palaeography), it has been dated to the 4th century AD. The codex is named after its place of conservation in the Vatican Library, where it has been kept since at least the 15th century.

The manuscript became known to Western scholars as a result of correspondence between textual critic Desiderius Erasmus Roterodamus (known usually as Erasmus) and the prefects of the Vatican Library. Portions of the codex were collated by several scholars, but numerous errors were made during this process. The codex's relationship to the Latin Vulgate and the value Jerome placed on it is unclear. In the 19th century AD transcriptions of the full codex were completed. It was at that point that scholars became more familiar with the text and how it differed from the more common Textus Receptus (a critical edition of the Greek New Testament based on earlier editions by Erasmus).

Most current scholars consider Codex Vaticanus to be one of the most important Greek witnesses to the Greek text of the New Testament, followed by Codex Sinaiticus. Until the discovery by Tischendorf of Sinaiticus, Vaticanus was considered to be unrivalled. It was extensively used by textual critics Brooke F. Westcott and Fenton J. A. Hort in their edition of The New Testament in the Original Greek in 1881. The most widely sold editions of the Greek New Testament are largely based on the text of the Codex Vaticanus.

== Description ==
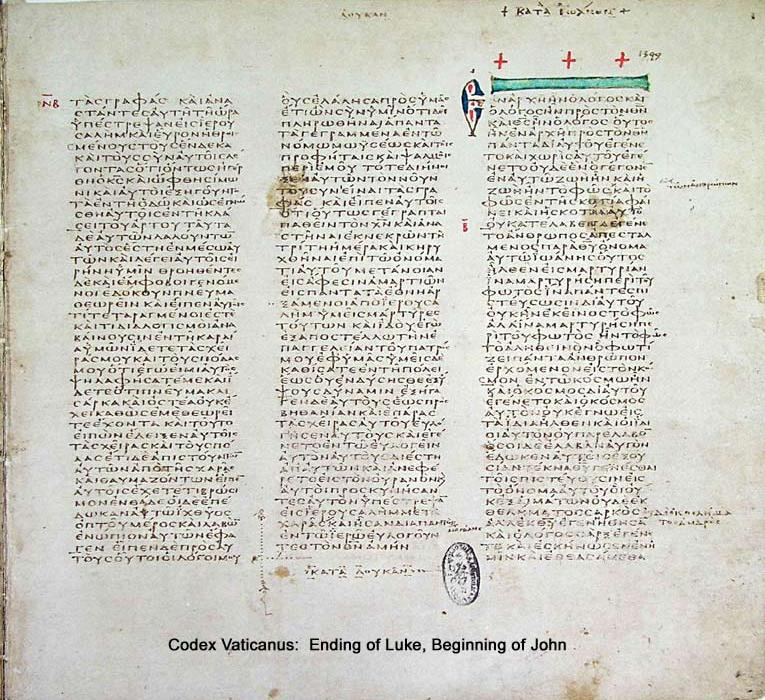
Ending of Luke and Beginning of John on the same page

The manuscript is a codex (precursor to the modern book) in quarto volume, written on 759 leaves of fine and thin vellum (sized 27 cm by 27 cm, although originally bigger), in uncial letters, arranged in quires of five sheets or ten leaves each, similar to Codex Marchalianus or Codex Rossanensis; but unlike Codex Sinaiticus which has an arrangement of four or three sheets. The number of the quires is often found in the margin. Originally it must have been composed of 830 parchment leaves, but it appears that 71 leaves have been lost. The Old Testament currently consists of 617 sheets and the New Testament of 142 sheets. The codex is written in three columns per page, with 40–44 lines per column, and 16–18 letters per line. In the poetical books of the Old Testament (OT) there are only two columns to a page. There are 44 lines in a column in the Pentateuch (first five books of the OT), Joshua, Judges, Ruth, and 1 Kings 1:1–19:11; in 2 Chronicles 10:16–26:13 there are 40 lines in a column; and in the New Testament always 42. The manuscript is one of the very few New Testament manuscripts to be written with three columns per page. The other two Greek codices written in that way are Uncial 048 and Uncial 053.

The Greek lettering in the codex is written continuously in small and neat letters. All the letters are equally distant from each other; no word is separated from the other, with each line appearing to be one long word. Punctuation is rare (accents and breathings have been added by a later hand) except for some blank spaces, diaeresis on initial iotas and upsilons, abbreviations of the nomina sacra (abbreviations of certain words and names considered sacred in Christianity) and markings of OT citations. The first letter of a new chapter sometimes protrudes a little from the column. The OT citations were marked by an inverted comma or diplai (>). There are no enlarged initials; no stops or accents; no divisions into chapters or sections such as are found in later manuscripts.

The text of the Gospels is not divided according to the Ammonian Sections with references to the Eusebian Canons, but is divided into peculiar numbered sections: Matthew has 170, Mark 61, Luke 152, and John 80. This system is only found in two other manuscripts: Codex Zacynthius and Minuscule 579. There are two system divisions in the Acts and the Catholic Epistles which differ from the Euthalian Apparatus. In Acts, these sections are 36 (the same system as Codex Sinaiticus, Codex Amiatinus, and Codex Fuldensis) and according to the other system 69 sections. The chapters in the Pauline epistles are numbered continuously as the Epistles were regarded as comprising one book.

== Text ==
The inter-relationship between various significant ancient manuscripts of the Old Testament. LXX here denotes the original Septuagint; "B" denotes the Codex Vaticanus

=== Text-type ===
In the Old Testament, the type of text varies, with a received text in Ezekiel and a rejected one in the Book of Isaiah. In Judges the text differs substantially from that of the majority of manuscripts, but agrees with the Old Latin, Sahidic version and Cyril of Alexandria. In Job, it has the additional 400 half-verses from Theodotion, which are not in the Old Latin and Sahidic versions. The text of the Old Testament was considered by critics, such as Hort and Cornill, to be substantially that which underlies Origen's Hexapla edition, completed by him at Caesarea and issued as an independent work (apart from the other versions with which Origen associated it) by Eusebius and Pamphilus.

In the New Testament, the Greek text of the codex is considered a representative of the Alexandrian text-type. It has been found to agree very closely with the text of Bodmer 𝔓^{75} in the Gospels of Luke and John. 𝔓^{75} has been dated to the beginning of the 3rd century, and hence is at least 100 years older than the Codex Vaticanus itself. This is purported to demonstrate (by recourse to a postulated earlier exemplar from which both 𝔓^{75} and B descend) that Vaticanus accurately reproduces an earlier text from these two biblical books, which reinforces the reputation the codex held amongst Biblical scholars. It also strongly suggests that it may have been copied in Egypt. In the Pauline epistles there is a distinctly Western element. Textual critic Kurt Aland placed it in Category I of his New Testament manuscript classification system. Category 1 manuscripts are described as "of a very special quality, i.e., manuscripts with a very high proportion of the early text, presumably the original text, which has not been preserved in its purity in any one manuscript."

=== Contents ===
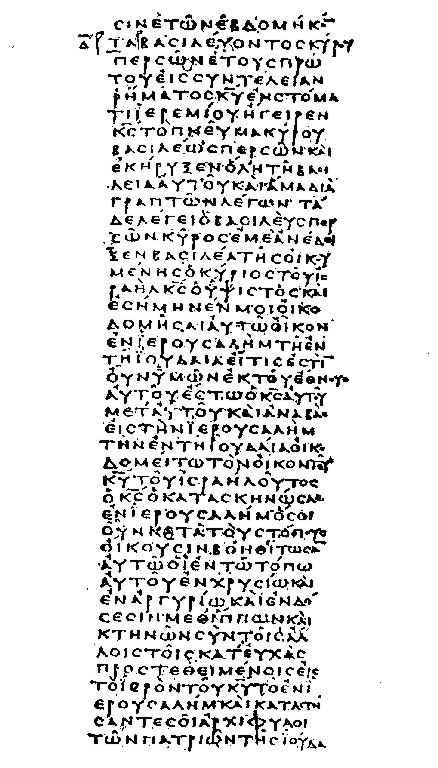
A section of the codex containing 1 Esdras 2:1–8

The codex originally contained a virtually complete copy of the Greek Old Testament (known as the Septuagint / LXX), lacking only 1-4 Maccabees and the Prayer of Manasseh. The original 20 leaves containing Genesis 1:1–46:28a (31 leaves) and Psalm 105:27–137:6b have been lost. These were replaced by pages transcribed by a later hand in the 15th century. 2 Kings 2:5–7, 10–13 are also lost due to a tear to one of the pages. The order of the Old Testament books in the codex is as follows: Genesis to 2 Chronicles as normal; 1 Esdras; 2 Esdras (Ezra–Nehemiah); the Psalms; Proverbs; Ecclesiastes; Song of Songs; Job; Wisdom; Ecclesiasticus; Esther; Judith; Tobit; the minor prophets from Hosea to Malachi (but in the order: Hosea, Amos, Micah, Joel, Obadiah, Jonah, Nahum, Habakkuk, Zephaniah, Haggai, Zechariah, Malachi); Isaiah; Jeremiah; Baruch; Lamentations and the Epistle of Jeremiah; Ezekiel and Daniel. This order differs from that followed in Codex Alexandrinus.

The extant New Testament portion contains the Gospels, Acts, the general epistles, the Pauline epistles, and the Epistle to the Hebrews (up to Hebrews 9:14, καθα[ριει); it is lacking 1 and 2 Timothy, Titus, Philemon, and Revelation. The missing part of Hebrews and Revelation were supplemented by a 15th-century minuscule hand (folios 760–768), and are catalogued separately as minuscule 1957. It is possible some apocryphal books from the New Testament were included at the end (as in codices Sinaiticus and Alexandrinus). It is also possible that Revelation was not included.

=== Non-included verses ===
The text of the New Testament lacks several passages:

- Matthew 12:47
- Matthew 16:2b–3
- Matthew 17:21
- Matthew 18:11
- Matthew 23:14
- Mark 7:16
- Mark 9:44
- Mark 9:46
- Mark 11:26
- Mark 15:28

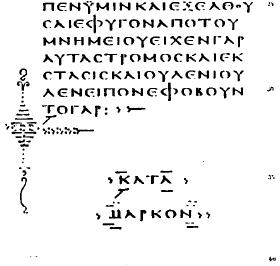
The end of Mark in Vaticanus contains an empty column after Verse 16:8, possibly suggesting that the scribe was aware of the missing ending. It is the only empty New Testament column in the Codex.

- Mark 16:9–20 — The Book of Mark ends with verse 16:8.
- Luke 17:36
- Luke 22:43–44 (Christ's agony at Gethsemane)
- John 5:4
- John 7:53-8:11 (Pericope Adulterae)
- Acts 8:37
- Acts 15:34
- Acts 24:7
- Acts 28:29
- Romans 16:24
- 1 Peter 5:3

Phrases not in Vaticanus but in later manuscripts include

- Matthew 5:44

εὐλογεῖτε τοὺς καταρωμένους ὑμᾶς, καλῶς ποιεῖτε τοῖς μισοῦσιν ὑμᾶς (bless those who curse you, do good to those who hate you)

omit - B א ƒ^{1} k sy^{s, c} sa bo^{pt} mae
incl. - Majority of manuscripts

- Matthew 10:37

καὶ ὁ φιλῶν υἱὸν ἢ θυγατέρα ὑπὲρ ἐμὲ οὐκ ἔστιν μου ἄξιος (and he who loves son or daughter more than me is not worthy of me)

omit - B* D
incl. - B^{c} Majority of manuscripts

- Matthew 15:6

ἢ τὴν μητέρα (αὐτοῦ) (or (his) mother)

omit - B א D a e sy^{c} sa
incl. - Majority of manuscripts

- Matthew 20:23

καὶ τὸ βάπτισμα ὂ ἐγὼ βαπτίζομαι βαπτισθήσεσθε (and be baptised with the baptism that I am baptised with)

omit - B א D L Z Θ 085 ƒ^{1} ƒ^{13} it sy^{s} sy^{c} sa
incl. - Majority of manuscripts

- Mark 10:7

καὶ προσκολληθήσεται πρὸς τὴν γυναῖκα αὐτοῦ (and be joined to his wife)

omit - Sinaiticus Ψ 892 ℓ 48 syr^{s} go
incl. - Majority of manuscripts

- Mark 10:19

μη αποστερησης

omit - B* K W Δ Ψ ƒ^{1} ƒ^{13} 28 579 700 1010 1079 1242 1546 2148 ℓ 10 ℓ 950 ℓ 1642 ℓ 1761 sy^{s} arm geo
incl. - B^{2} Majority of manuscripts

- Luke 9:55–56

και ειπεν, Ουκ οιδατε ποιου πνευματος εστε υμεις; ο γαρ υιος του ανθρωπου ουκ ηλθεν ψυχας ανθρωπων απολεσαι αλλα σωσαι (and He said: "You do not know what manner of spirit you are of; for the Son of man came not to destroy men's lives but to save them)

omit - B א C L Θ Ξ 33 700 892 1241 syr bo
incl. - Majority of manuscripts

- Luke 11:4

αλλα ρυσαι ημας απο του πονηρου (but deliver us from evil)

omit - B 𝔓^{75} א L ƒ^{1} 700 vg sy^{s} sa bo arm geo
incl. - Majority of manuscripts

- Luke 23:34

ὁ δὲ Ἰησοῦς ἔλεγεν· Πάτερ, ἄφες αὐτοῖς· οὐ γὰρ οἴδασιν τί ποιοῦσιν (And Jesus said: Father forgive them, they know not what they do.)

omit - B 𝔓^{75} א^{a} D* W Θ 0124 1241 a d syr^{s} sa bo
incl. - Majority of manuscripts

=== Additions ===
Gospel of Matthew 27:49

ἄλλος δὲ λαβὼν λόγχην ἒνυξεν αὐτοῦ τὴν πλευράν, καὶ ἐξῆλθεν ὕδωρ καὶ αἷμα (and another took a spear, piercing His side, and out came water and blood - see John 19:34)

incl. - B א C L Γ 1010 1293 vg^{mss}
omit - Majority of manuscripts

=== Some notable readings ===
Judges 18:30

υἱὸς Μανασση (son of Manasse) - B
υἱοῦ Μωυσῆ (son of Moses) - A

Matthew 5:22

εικη (without cause)

omit - B 𝔓^{67} א vg^{mss} eth
incl. - Majority of manuscripts

Matthew 17:23

τη τριημερα (the third day) - B (singular reading)
τη τριτη ημερα (the third day) - Majority of manuscripts

Matthew 21:31

ὁ ὕστερος (the last) - B (singular reading)
ὁ ἔσχατος (the last) - D Θ ƒ^{13} 700 it
ὁ πρῶτος (the first) - Majority of manuscripts

Matthew 23:38

ερημος (desert)

omit - B L ff2 sy^{s} sa bo
incl. - Majority of manuscripts

Luke 4:17

καὶ ἀνοίξας τὸ βιβλίον (and opened the book) - B A L W Ξ 33 892 1195 1241 ℓ 547 syr^{s, h, pal} sa bo
καὶ ἀναπτύξας τὸ βιβλίον (and unrolled the book) - א D^{c} K Δ Θ Π Ψ ƒ^{1} ƒ^{13} 28 565 700 1009 1010 Majority of manuscripts

Luke 6:2

οὐκ ἔξεστιν (not lawful) - B 𝔓^{4} Codex Nitriensis 700 lat sa bo arm geo
οὐκ ἔξεστιν ποιεῖν (not lawful to do) - Majority of manuscripts

Luke 10:42

ολιγων δε χρεια εστιν η ενος (few things are needful, or only one) - B (singular reading; but see below)
ολιγων δε εστιν χρεια η ενος (few things are needful, or only one) - 𝔓^{3} א C^{2} L 070^{(vid)} ƒ^{1} 33 sy^{h(mg)} bo
ενος δε εστιν χρεια (one thing is needful) - 𝔓^{45} 𝔓^{75} Majority of manuscripts

John 12:28

δοξασον μου το ονομα (glorify my name) - B (singular reading)
δοξασον σου τον υιον (glorify Your Son)- L X ƒ^{1} ƒ^{13} 33 1241 vg sy^{h(mg)} bo
δοξασον σου το ονομα (glorify Your name) - Majority of manuscripts

John 16:27

πατρος (the Father) - B א^{1} C* D L ℓ 844 bo
θεου (God) - C^{3} W Ψ ƒ^{1} ƒ^{13} Majority of manuscripts

Acts 27:16

καυδα (name of island) - B 𝔓^{74} א^{2} 1175 lat vg sy^{p}
Κλαυδα (name of island) - א* A^{(vid)} 33 81 614 945 1505 1739 vg^{mss} sy^{h}
Κλαυδην (name of island) - Majority of manuscripts (Note: For more textual variants of this verse see: Textual variants in the Acts of the Apostles.)

Romans 15:31

δωροφορια - B D G^{gr}
διακονια - Majority of manuscripts

Ephesians 2:1

αμαρτιαις (sins) - B (singular reading)
επιθυμιαις (desires) - Majority of manuscripts

Hebrews 1:3

φανερων (revealing) - B (singular reading)
φερων (upholding) - Majority of manuscripts

== History ==
=== Provenance ===
The provenance and early history of the codex are uncertain; Rome (Hort), southern Italy, Alexandria (Kenyon,), and Caesarea (T. C. Skeat; Burkitt) have been suggested as possible origins. Hort based his argument for Rome mainly on certain spellings of proper names, such as Ισακ and Ιστραηλ, which show a Western or Latin influence. A second argument was the chapter division in Acts, similar to the ones in Sinaiticus and Vaticanus, is not found in any other Greek manuscript, but is present in several manuscripts of the Latin Vulgate. Robinson cautiously suggests, however, that the system of chapter divisions was introduced into the Vulgate by Jerome himself, due to his studies at Caesarea. Hort also postulated the codex was copied from a manuscript whose line length was 12–14 letters per line, as when the codex's scribe made large omissions, they were typically 12–14 letters long.

Kenyon suggested the manuscript originated in Alexandria: "It is noteworthy that the section numeration of the Pauline Epistles in B shows that it was copied from a manuscript in which the Epistle to the Hebrews was placed between Galatians and Ephesians—an arrangement which elsewhere occurs only in the Sahidic version." Kenyon also suggested the order of the Pauline epistles indicates a connection with Egypt, and as in Codex Alexandrinus, the titles of some of the books contain letters of a distinctively Coptic character, particularly the Coptic mu (which was also frequently seen at the ends of lines where space has to be economized). According to Metzger, "the similarity of its text in significant portions of both Testaments with the Coptic versions and with Greek papyri, and the style of writing (notably the Coptic forms used in some of the titles) point rather to Egypt and Alexandria".

It has been postulated the codex was at one time in the possession of Cardinal Bessarion, because the minuscule supplement has a text similar to one of Bessarion's manuscripts. T. C. Skeat believed Bessarion's mentor, the patriarchal notary in Constantinople John Chortasmenos, had the book brought to Rome from Constantinople around the time of the fall of the Byzantine Empire. Paul Canart argued the decorative initials added to the manuscript in the Middle Ages are reminiscent of Constantinopolitan decoration found in the 10th century, but the poor execution gives the impression they were added in the 11th or 12th century, and likely not before the 12th century in light of the way they appear in connection with notes in a minuscule hand at the beginning of the book of Daniel. T. C. Skeat first argued that Codex Vaticanus was among the 50 Bibles that the Emperor Constantine I ordered Eusebius of Caesarea to produce.

The codex is generally assigned to the middle of the fourth century and considered contemporary with or slightly earlier than Codex Sinaiticus, which can be dated with a reasonable degree of confidence between the early fourth century and the early fifth century.

=== Scribes and correctors ===
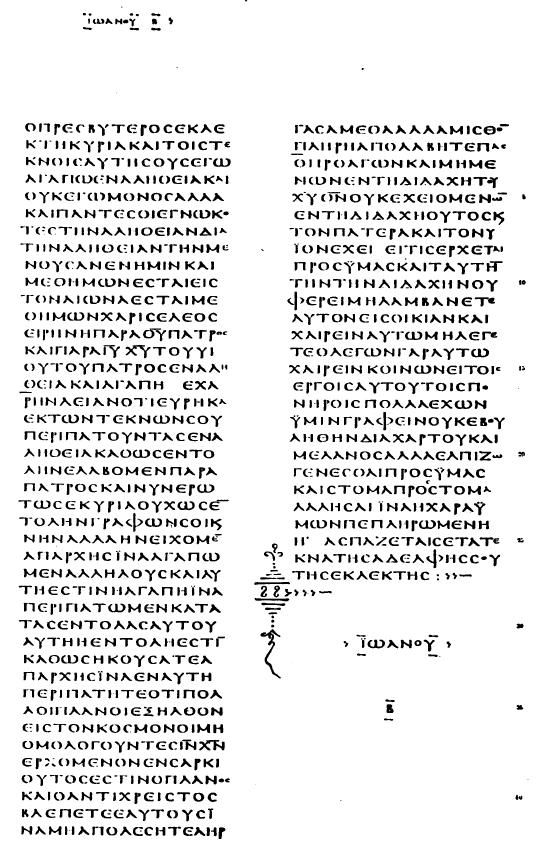
2 Epistle of John in the codex

According to Tischendorf the manuscript was written by three scribes (A, B, C), two of whom appear to have written the Old Testament and one the entire New Testament. Tischendorf's view was accepted by Frederic G. Kenyon, but contested by T. C. Skeat, who examined the codex more thoroughly. Skeat and other paleographers contested Tischendorf's theory of a third (C) scribe, instead asserting two scribes worked on the Old Testament (A and B) and one of them (B) wrote the New Testament.

Scribe A wrote:

Genesis – 1 Kings (pages 41–334)
Psalms – Tobias (pages 625–944)

Scribe B wrote:

1 Kings – 2 Esdra (pages 335–624)
Hosea – Daniel (pages 945–1234)
New Testament.

Two correctors have been suggested as working on the manuscript, one (B^{2}) was contemporary with the scribes, the other (B^{3}) worked in about the 10th or 11th century. The theory of a first corrector, B^{1}, proposed by Tischendorf was rejected by later scholars. According to Tischendorf, one of the scribes is identical to (and may have been) one of the scribes of Codex Sinaiticus (scribe D), but there is insufficient evidence for his assertion. Skeat agreed that the writing style is very similar to that of Codex Sinaiticus, but there is not enough evidence to accept the scribes were identical: "the identity of the scribal tradition stands beyond dispute".

The original writing was retraced by a later scribe (usually dated to the 10th or 11th century), and the beauty of the original script was spoiled. Accents, breathing marks, and punctuation were added by a later hand. There are no enlarged initials, no divisions into chapters or sections such as are found in later manuscripts, but a different system of division peculiar to this manuscript. There are plenty itacistic faults, especially the interchange of ει for ι and αι for ε. The exchange of ο for ω is less frequent.

The manuscript contains unusual small horizontally aligned double dots in the column margins and are scattered throughout the New Testament. (Note: List of umlauts in the New Testament of the Codex Vaticanus) These so-called distigmai (singular distigme, Ancient Greek: διστίγμη) were formerly called "umlauts" (owing to their shape, different from the vertically aligned double-dot Aristarchian obelisms). There are 795 of these clearly seen in the text, and perhaps another 40 that are undetermined. The date of these markings are disputed among scholars. Two such distigmai can be seen in the left margin of the first column (top image). Tischendorf reflected upon their meaning, but without any resolution. He pointed on several places where these distigmai were used: at the ending of the Gospel of Mark, 1 Thess 2:14; 5:28; Heb 4:16; 8:1. The meaning of these distigmai was recognized in 1995 by Philip Payne. Payne discovered the first distigme while studying the section 1 Cor 14.34–35 of the codex. He suggested that distigmai indicate lines where another textual variant was known to the person who wrote the umlauts. Therefore, the distigmai mark places of textual uncertainty. The same distigmai were observed in Codex Fuldensis, especially in the section containing 1 Cor 14:34–35. The distigme of two codices indicate a variant of the Western manuscripts, which placed 1 Cor 14:34–35 after 1 Cor 14:40 (manuscripts: Claromontanus, Augiensis, Boernerianus, 88, it^{d, g}, and some manuscripts of Vulgate).

On page 1512, next to Hebrews 1:3, the text contains a marginal note, "Fool and knave, leave the old reading and do not change it!" – "ἀμαθέστατε καὶ κακέ, ἄφες τὸν παλαιόν, μὴ μεταποίει" which may suggest unauthorised correcting was a recognized problem in scriptoriums.

== In the Vatican Library ==
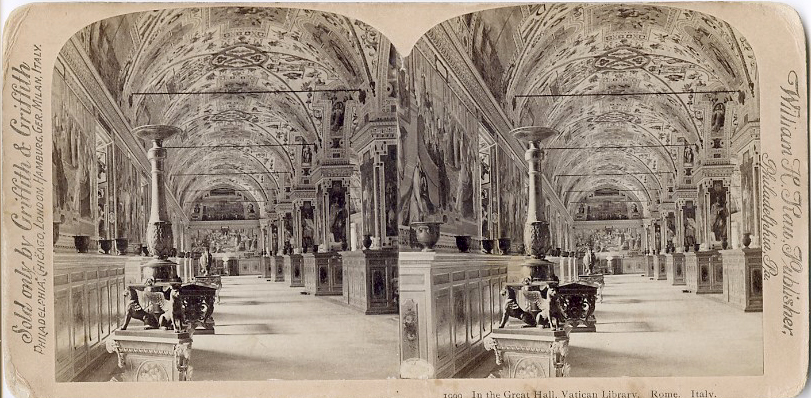
The Great Hall, Vatican Library, photographed by William H. Rau

The manuscript is believed to have been housed in Caesarea in the 6th century, together with Codex Sinaiticus, as they have the same unique division of chapters in Acts. It came to Italy, probably from Constantinople, after the Council of Florence (1438–1445).

The manuscript has been housed in the Vatican Library (founded by Pope Nicholas V in 1448) for as long as it has been known, possibly appearing in the library's earliest catalog of 1475 (with shelf number 1209), but definitely appearing in the 1481 catalog. In the catalog from 1481 it was described as a "Biblia in tribus columnis ex membranis in rubeo" (three-column vellum Bible). To this day it has kept this shelf number as Vat Lib. gr. 1209.

=== Collations ===
In the 16th century, Western scholars became aware of the manuscript as a consequence of the correspondence between Erasmus and the prefects of the Vatican Library, successively Paulus Bombasius, and Juan Ginés de Sepúlveda. In 1521, Bombasius was consulted by Erasmus as to whether the Codex Vaticanus contained the Comma Johanneum, and Bombasius supplied a transcript of 1 John 4:1–3 and 1 John 5:7–11 to show that it did not. Sepúlveda in 1533 cross-checked all places where Erasmus's New Testament (the Textus Receptus) differed from the Vulgate, and supplied Erasmus with 365 readings where the Codex Vaticanus supported the latter, although the list of these 365 readings has been lost. (Note: We know nothing about these 365 readings except one. Erasmus in his Adnotationes on Acts 27:16 wrote that according to the Codex from the Library Pontifici, the name of the island is καυδα (Cauda), not κλαυδα (Clauda) as in his Novum Testamentum (Tamet si quidam admonent in codice Graeco pontificiae bibliothecae scriptum haberi, καυδα, id est, cauda). See: Erasmus Desiderius, Erasmus' Annotations on the New Testament: Acts – Romans – I and II Corinthians, ed. A. Reeve and M. A. Sceech, (Brill: Leiden 1990), p. 931. Andrew Birch was the first, who identified this note with 365 readings of Sepulveda.) Consequently, the Codex Vaticanus acquired the reputation of being an old Greek manuscript that agreed with the Vulgate rather than with the Textus Receptus. Not until much later would scholars realise it conformed to a text that differed from both the Vulgate and the Textus Receptus – a text that could also be found in other known early Greek manuscripts, such as the Codex Regius (L), housed in the French Royal Library (now Bibliothèque nationale de France).

Giulio Bartolocci, librarian of the Vatican, produced a collation in 1669 which was not published; it was never used until a copy of it was found in the Royal Library at Paris by Scholz in 1819. This collation was imperfect and revised in 1862. Another collation was made in 1720 for Bentley by Mico, then revised by Rulotta, which was not published until 1799. Bentley was stirred by Mill's claim of 30,000 variants in the New Testament and he wanted to reconstruct the text of the New Testament in its early form. He felt that among the manuscripts of the New Testament, Codex Alexandrinus was "the oldest and best in the world". Bentley understood the necessity to use manuscripts if he were to reconstruct an older form than that apparent in Codex Alexandrinus. He assumed that by supplementing this manuscript with readings from other Greek manuscripts, and from the Latin Vulgate, he could triangulate back to a single recension which he presumed existed at the time of the First Council of Nicaea. He therefore required a collation from Vaticanus. The text of the collation was irreconcilable with Codex Alexandrinus and he abandoned the project.

A further collation was made by the Danish scholar Andreas Birch, who, in 1798, in Copenhagen, edited some textual variants of the Acts of the Apostles and the Epistles, in 1800 for the Book of Revelation, in 1801 for the Gospels. They were incomplete and included together with the textual variants from the other manuscripts. Many of them were false. Andrew Birch reproached Mill and Wettstein, that they falso citatur Vaticanus (cite Vaticanus incorrectly), and gave as an example Luke 2:38 – Ισραηλ [Israel] instead of Ιερουσαλημ [Jerusalem]. The reading Ισραηλ could be found in the codex 130, housed at the Vatican Library, under shelf number Vat. gr. 359.

Before the 19th century, no scholar was allowed to study or edit the Codex Vaticanus, and scholars did not ascribe any value to it; in fact, it was suspected to have been interpolated by the Latin textual tradition. John Mill wrote in his Prolegomena (1707): "in Occidentalium gratiam a Latino scriba exaratum" (written by a Latin scribe for the western world). He did not believe there was value to having a collation for the manuscript. Wettstein would have liked to know the readings of the codex, but not because he thought that they could have been of any help to him for difficult textual decisions. According to him, this codex had no authority whatsoever (sed ut vel hoc constaret, Codicem nullus esse auctoris). In 1751 Wettstein produced the first list of the New Testament manuscripts, Codex Vaticanus received symbol B (because of its age) and took second position on this list (Alexandrinus received A, Ephraemi – C, Bezae – D, etc.) until the discovery of Codex Sinaiticus (designated by א).

Griesbach produced a list of nine manuscripts which were to be assigned to the Alexandrian text: C, L, K, 1, 13, 33, 69, 106, and 118. Codex Vaticanus was not in this list. In the second (1796) edition of his Greek NT, Griesbach added Codex Vaticanus as a witness to the Alexandrian text in Mark, Luke, and John. He still believed the first half of Matthew represented the Western text-type.

=== Editions of text of the codex ===
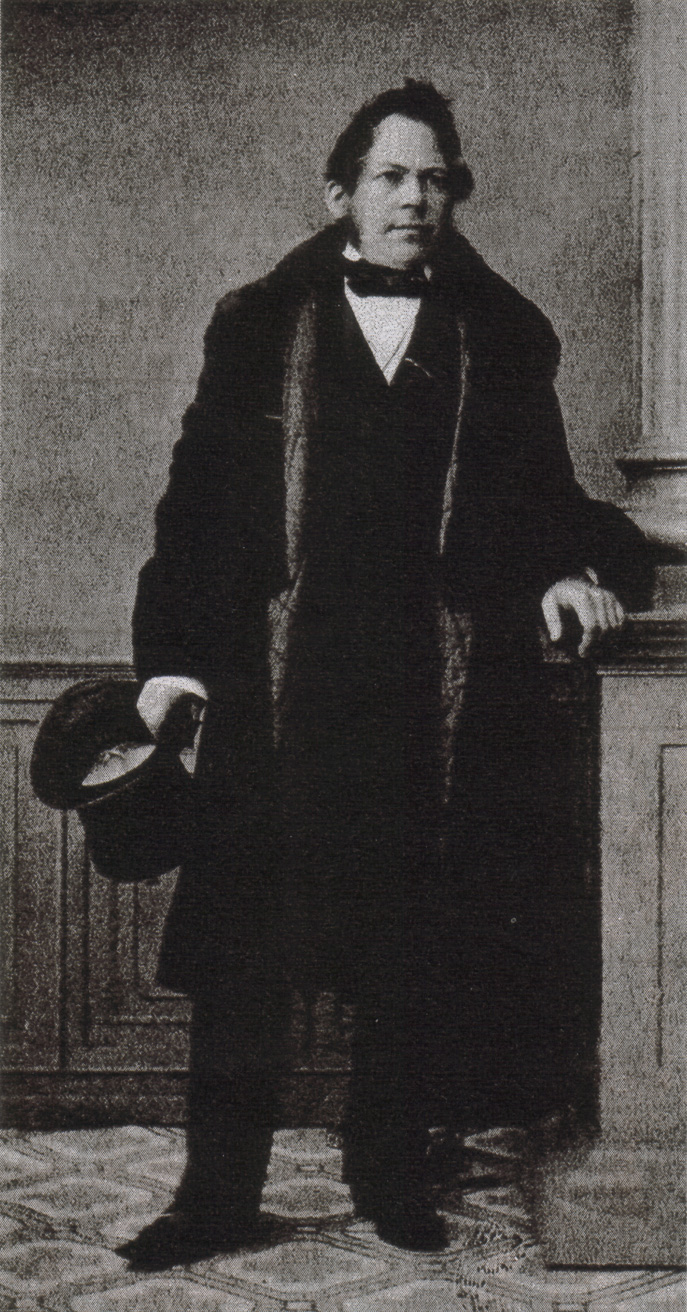
In 1843 Tischendorf was permitted to make a facsimile of a few verses.

In 1799, as a result of the Treaty of Tolentino, the manuscript was sent to Paris as a victory trophy for Napoleon, but in 1815 it was returned to the Vatican Library. During that time, German scholar Johann Leonhard Hug (1765–1846) saw it in Paris. Together with other worthy treasures of the Vatican, Hug examined it, but he did not perceive the need of a new and full collation.

Cardinal Angelo Mai prepared the first typographical facsimile edition between 1828 and 1838, which did not appear until 1857, three years after his death, and which was considered unsatisfactory. It was issued in 5 volumes (1–4 volumes for the Old Testament, 5 volume for the New Testament). All lacunae of the codex were supplemented. Lacunae in the Acts and Pauline epistles were supplemented from the codex Vaticanus 1761, the whole text of Revelation from Vaticanus 2066, and the text of Mark 16:8–20 from Vaticanus Palatinus 220. Verses not included by codex as Matthew 12:47; Mark 15:28; Luke 22:43–44; 23:17.34; John 5:3.4; 7:53–8:11; 1 Peter 5:3; 1 John 5:7 were supplemented from popular Greek printed editions. The number of errors was extraordinarily high, and also no attention was paid to distinguish readings of the first hand versus correctors. There was no detailed examination of the manuscript's characteristics. As a consequence, this edition was deemed inadequate for critical purposes. An improved edition was published in 1859, which became the source of Bultmann's 1860 NT.

In 1843 Tischendorf was permitted to make a facsimile of a few verses, (Note: Besides the twenty-five readings Tischendorf observed himself, Cardinal Mai supplied him with thirty-four more his NT of 1849. His seventh edition of the text of New Testament (1859) was enriched by 230 other readings furnished by Albert Dressel in 1855.) in 1844 Eduard de Muralt saw it, and in 1845 S. P. Tregelles was allowed to observe several points which Muralt had overlooked. He often saw the codex, but "it was under such restrictions that it was impossible to do more than examine particular readings".

"They would not let me open it without searching my pockets, and depriving me of pen, ink, and paper; and at the same time two prelati kept me in constant conversation in Latin, and if I looked at a passage too long, they would snatch the book out of my hand".

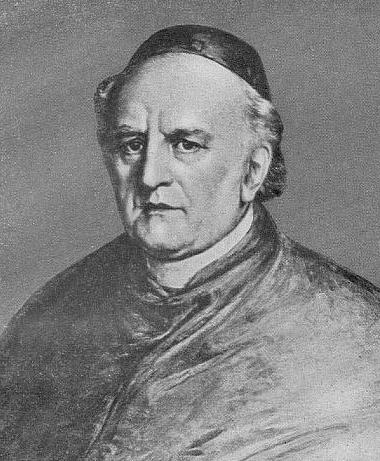
Angelo Mai prepared first facsimile edition of the New Testament text of the codex

Tregelles left Rome after five months without accomplishing his purpose. During a large part of the 19th century, the authorities of the Vatican Library obstructed scholars who wished to study the codex in detail. Henry Alford in 1849 wrote: "It has never been published in facsimile (!) nor even thoroughly collated (!!)." Scrivener in 1861 commented:

"Codex Vaticanus 1209 is probably the oldest large vellum manuscript in existence, and is the glory of the great Vatican Library in Rome. To these legitimate sources of deep interest must be added the almost romantic curiosity which has been excited by the jealous watchfulness of its official guardians, with whom an honest zeal for its safe preservation seems to have now degenerated into a species of capricious wilfulness, and who have shewn a strange incapacity for making themselves the proper use of a treasure they scarcely permit others more than to gaze upon". It (...) "is so jealously guarded by the Papal authorities that ordinary visitors see nothing of it but the red Morocco binding".

Thomas Law Montefiore (1862):

"The history of the Codex Vaticanus B, No. 1209, is the history in miniature of Romish jealousy and exclusiveness."

Burgon was permitted to examine the codex for an hour and a half in 1860, consulting 16 different passages. Burgon was a defender of the Traditional Text and for him Codex Vaticanus, as well as codices Sinaiticus and Bezae, were the most corrupt documents extant. He felt that each of these three codices "clearly exhibits a fabricated text – is the result of arbitrary and reckless recension." The two most widely respected of these three codices, א and B, he likens to the "two false witnesses" of Matthew 26:60.

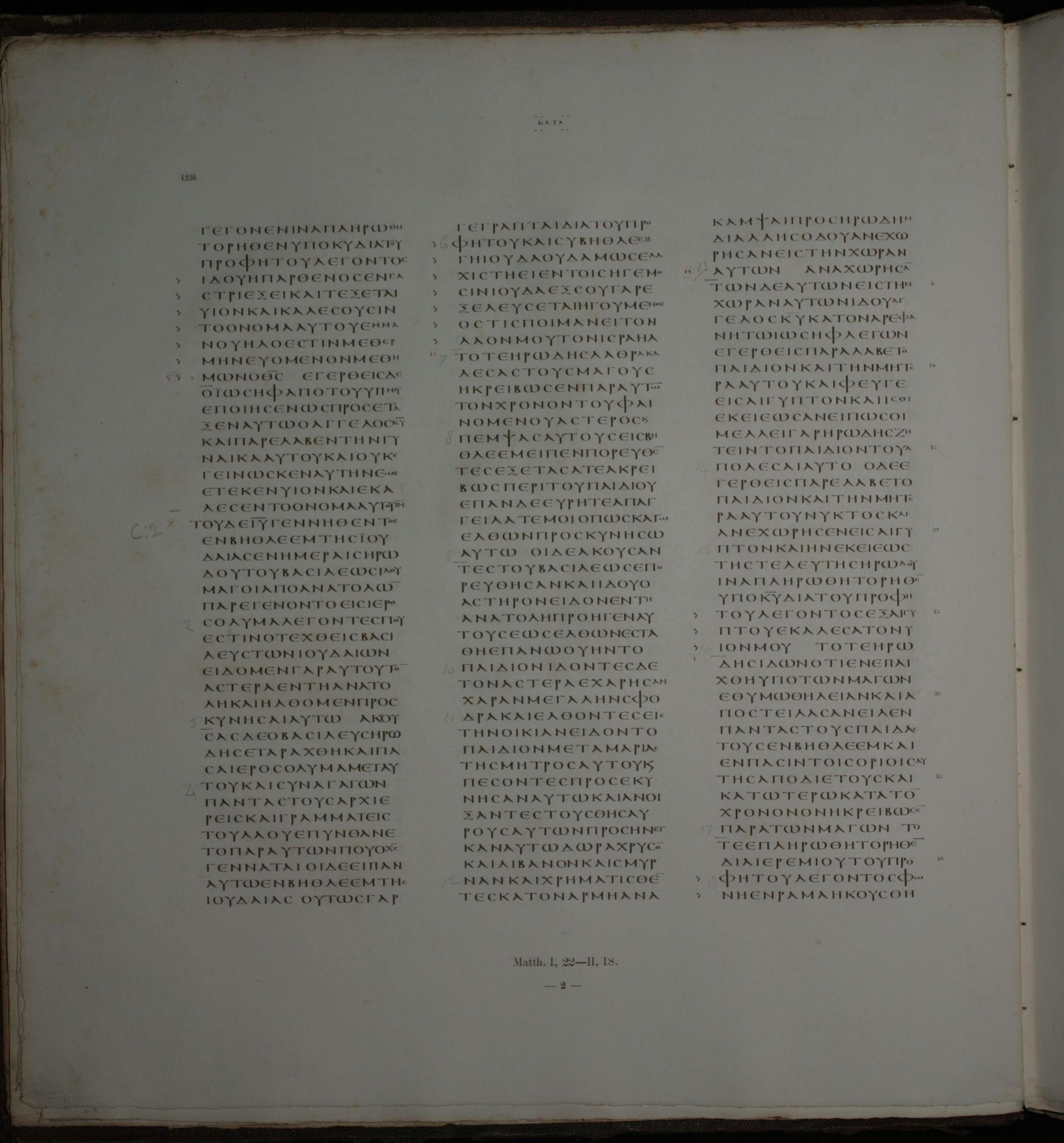
Vaticanus in facsimile edition (1868), page with text of Matthew 1:22–2:18

In 1861, Henry Alford collated and verified doubtful passages (in several imperfect collations), which he published in facsimile editions complete with errors. Until he began his work he met unexpected hindrances. He received a special order from Cardinal Antonelli "per verificare", to verify passages, but this license was interpreted by the librarian to mean that he was to see the book, but not to use it. In 1862, secretary of Alford, Mr. Cure, continued Alford's work. For some reason which does not clearly appear, the authorities of the Vatican Library put continual obstacles in the way of all who wished to study it in detail, one of which was the Vatican Library was only opened for three hours a day. In 1867 Tischendorf published the text of the New Testament of the codex on the basis of Mai's edition. It was the "most perfect edition of the manuscript which had yet appeared".

In 1868–1881 C. Vercellone, Giuseppe Cozza-Luzi, and G. Sergio published an edition of the entire codex in 6 volumes (New Testament in volume V; Prolegomena in volume VI). A typographical facsimile appeared between 1868 and 1872. In 1889–1890 a photographic facsimile of the entire manuscript was made and published by Cozza-Luzi, in three volumes. Another facsimile of the New Testament text was published in 1904–1907 in Milan. As a result, the codex became widely available.

In 1999, the Istituto Poligrafico e Zecca dello Stato in Rome (the Italian State Printing House and Mint) published a limited edition, full-color, exact scale facsimile of Codex Vaticanus. The facsimile reproduces the very form of the pages of the original manuscript, complete with the distinctive individual shape of each page, including holes in the vellum. It has an additional Prolegomena volume with gold and silver impressions of 74 pages.

As of 2015, a digitised copy of the codex is available online from the Vatican Library.

== Importance ==
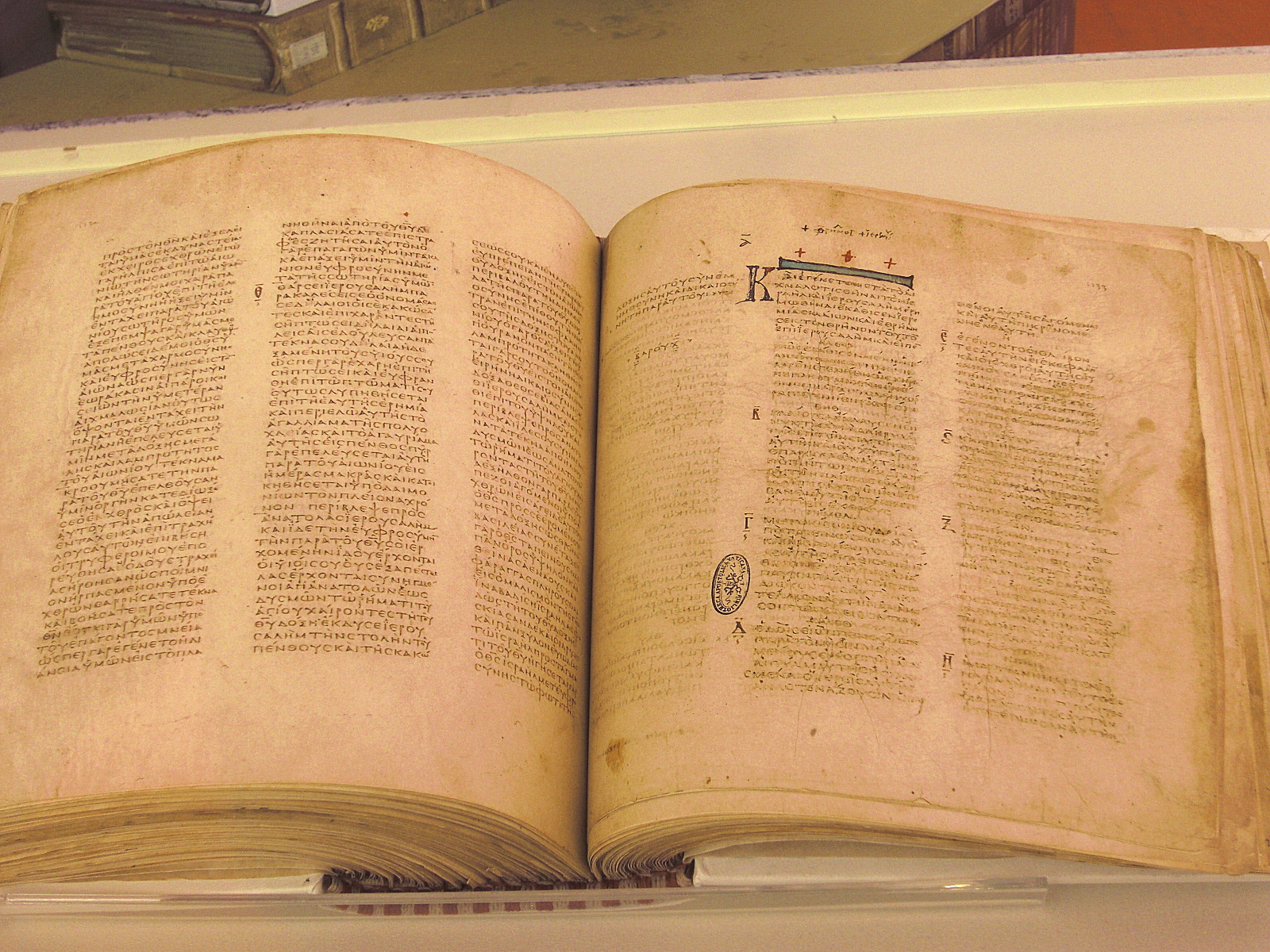
Exhibition in Warsaw (2015)

Codex Vaticanus is considered as one of the most important manuscripts for the text of the Septuagint and Greek New Testament. It is a leading example of the Alexandrian text-type. It was used by Westcott and Hort in their edition, The New Testament in the Original Greek (1881), and it was the basis for their text. All critical editions of the New Testament published after Westcott and Hort were closer in the Gospels to the Codex Vaticanus text than to the Sinaiticus, with only the exception of Hermann von Soden's editions which are closer to Sinaiticus. All editions of Nestle-Aland remain close in textual character to the text of Westcott-Hort.

According to the commonly accepted opinion of the textual critics, it is the most important witness of the text of the Gospels, in the Acts and Catholic epistles, with a stature equal to Codex Sinaiticus, although in the Pauline epistles it includes Western readings and the value of the text is somewhat less than the Codex Sinaiticus. The manuscript is not complete. Aland notes: "B is by far the most significant of the uncials".

== See also ==
- List of New Testament uncials
- Biblical manuscript
- Textual criticism
- Minuscule 2427
- Differences between codices Sinaiticus and Vaticanus
- Fifty Bibles of Constantine

== Cited books ==
- Metzger, Bruce Manning (2001). A Textual Commentary on the Greek New Testament. Stuttgart: Deutsche Bibelgesellschaft. ISBN 3-438-06010-8.
- Swete, Henry Barclay (1902). An Introduction to the Old Testament in Greek. Cambridge: Cambridge University Press.
