= Jesus preaches in a ship =

Biblical narrative of Jesus preaching from a ship

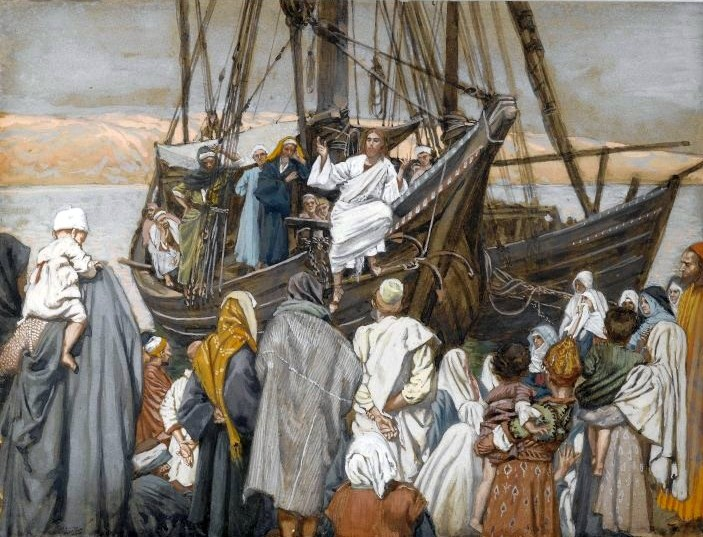
Jesus preaches in a ship by James Tissot

This narrative is told in Matthew 13:1-3, Mark 4:1, and Luke 5:1-3. Owing to the vast crowds that followed him from the surrounding towns and villages to listen to his doctrine, Jesus retired to the sea coast. There he entered a boat, that he used as a pulpit, and addressed the crowd on the shore.

The narrative occurs as an introduction to a set of Jesus' parable teachings, which starts with the Parable of the Sower.

Numerous artists have made this event the subject of their artwork, including, James Tissot and Alexandre Bida.

== Narrative ==
=== Lukian version ===
And it came to pass, that, as the people pressed upon him to hear the word of God, he stood by the lake of Gennesaret, And saw two ships standing by the lake: but the fishermen were gone out of them, and were washing their nets. And he entered into one of the ships, which was Simon's, and prayed him that he would thrust out a little from the land. And he sat down, and taught the people out of the ship.

— Luke 5:1-3, New International Version

== Significance of the boat ==
Ben Witherington III observes that in Mark 4:1 Jesus is "backed into the boat" by a crowd so large that the vessel offers the only available standing room; the Greek says literally that he "got into the boat and sat on the sea". Witherington notes that sitting was the customary posture of a teacher in first-century Jewish culture, so that even under these awkward circumstances Jesus assumes the recognised teaching posture, signalling to the crowd that what follows is formal instruction rather than incidental speech.

Darrell L. Bock observes that the boat in Luke's version is a practical concession to the popularity of Jesus' preaching at the Lake of Gennesaret — the press of the crowd (Luke 5:1) leaves Jesus no other place to stand and address them. Bock notes that an average first-century Galilean fishing vessel of the kind reflected in the archaeological "Galilee Boat" finds was roughly twenty to thirty feet in length, large enough to serve as a stable platform for a teacher seated near the bow with hearers ranged along the gently sloping shore.

John Nolland observes that a cluster of manuscripts (D K Γ Δ, f13, 563, 579 and others) read "the boat" in Matthew 13:2 rather than the indefinite "a boat" of the earliest witnesses, evidently a scribal harmonisation intended to identify the vessel with the boat of the disciple-fishermen mentioned at Matthew 4:21–22, Matthew 8:23–24, and elsewhere.

== Literary Structure ==
Witherington argues that the boat-pulpit episode marks a structural turning point in Mark's narrative: although Mark insistently presents Jesus as a teacher, the section beginning at Mark 4:1 is the first extended block of teaching content in the gospel, and the Evangelist's selective editing implies that what is preserved is only a small sample of a much longer sermon delivered from the boat.

Kenneth E. Bailey reads the Lukan version (Luke 5:1–11) as a tightly structured composition in seven scenes, in which the boat-teaching forms the first member of an inverted parallelism: scene 1 "boats out from land", in which Jesus sits and teaches, is answered by scene 7 "boats to land", in which the disciples "left everything and followed him". On Bailey's analysis the central scene is Peter's confession of sinfulness, so that the boat is at once a teaching platform, a stage for a confessional encounter, and a literary frame for the call narrative. Bailey takes the sophistication of the structure as evidence that Luke received the story already shaped by an educated Jewish-Christian tradition, with deliberate verbal connections to the call of Isaiah (Isaiah 6).

== Commentary ==
=== 4th-century ===
Hilary of Poitiers comments on why Jesus sat in the ship, while the crowd remained on the shore, writing, "for He was about to speak in parables, and by this action signifies that they who were without the Church could have no understanding of the Divine Word. The ship offers a type of the Church, within which the word of life is placed, and is preached to those without, and who as being barren sand cannot understand it."

=== 17th-century ===
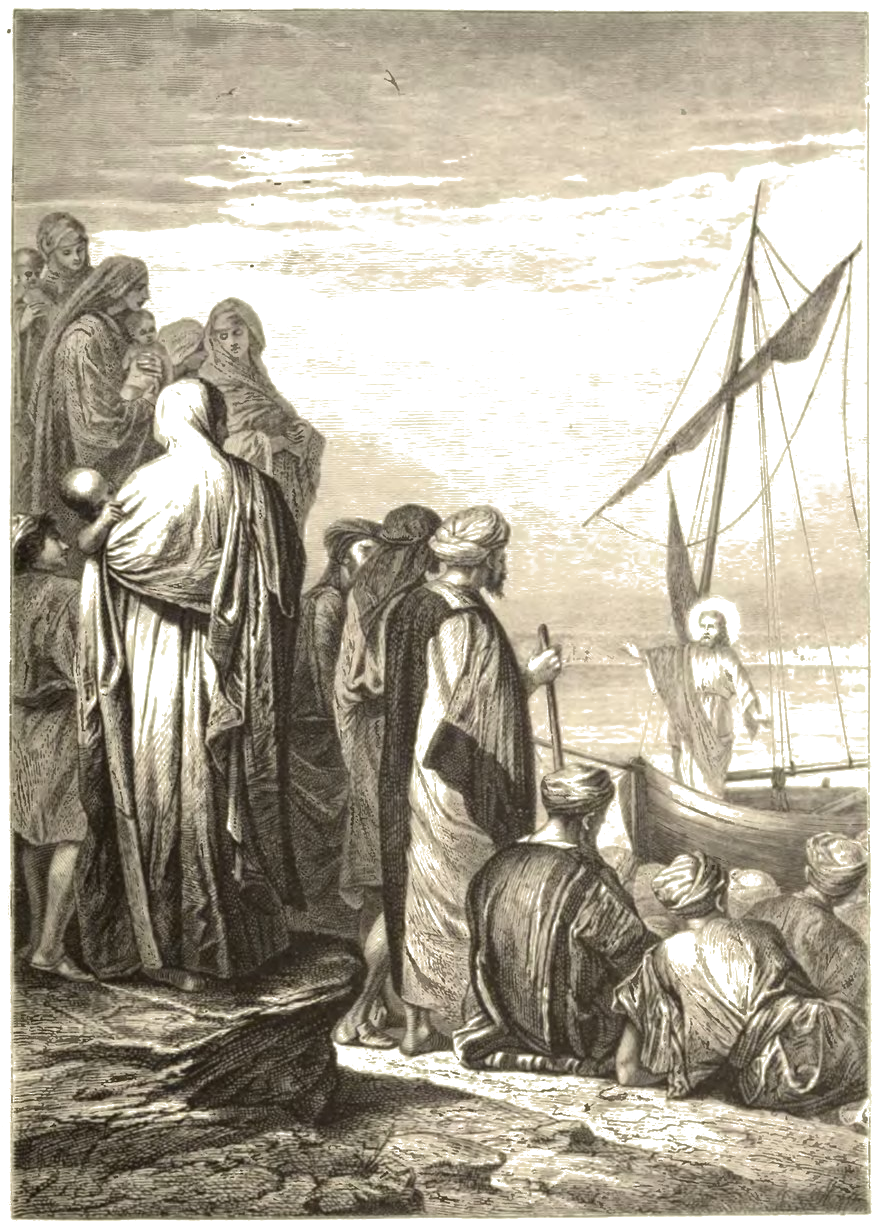
Jesus preaches from a ship (Alexandre Bida)

Cornelius a Lapide notes that when Jesus, as was his custom, had finished preaching in His house in Capernaum, He sent away the crowd so they might attend to themselves, and that He should allow some rest and food for Himself and His disciples. However, since He knew that the crowds were about to come to Him in such numbers that His house could not accommodate them, He left to the wide, open shore of the Sea of Galilee. There he used a boat as a pulpit and preached to the crowd on the shore.

=== 19th-century (Catholic) ===
John McEvilly comments on the words “many things,” (Matt 13:3) writing, "most likely, He spoke much more than is here recorded. For, if every thing which Jesus did, was written, “the world itself would not be able to contain the books that should be written”" (John 21:25).

A number of commentators have used this episode to support the primacy of Peter, since Jesus uses Peter's boat to preach from, and Peter would later become the foremost disciple among the apostles for preaching himself (see Acts 2).

== Gallery of art ==
Depictions of Jesus preaching from a ship

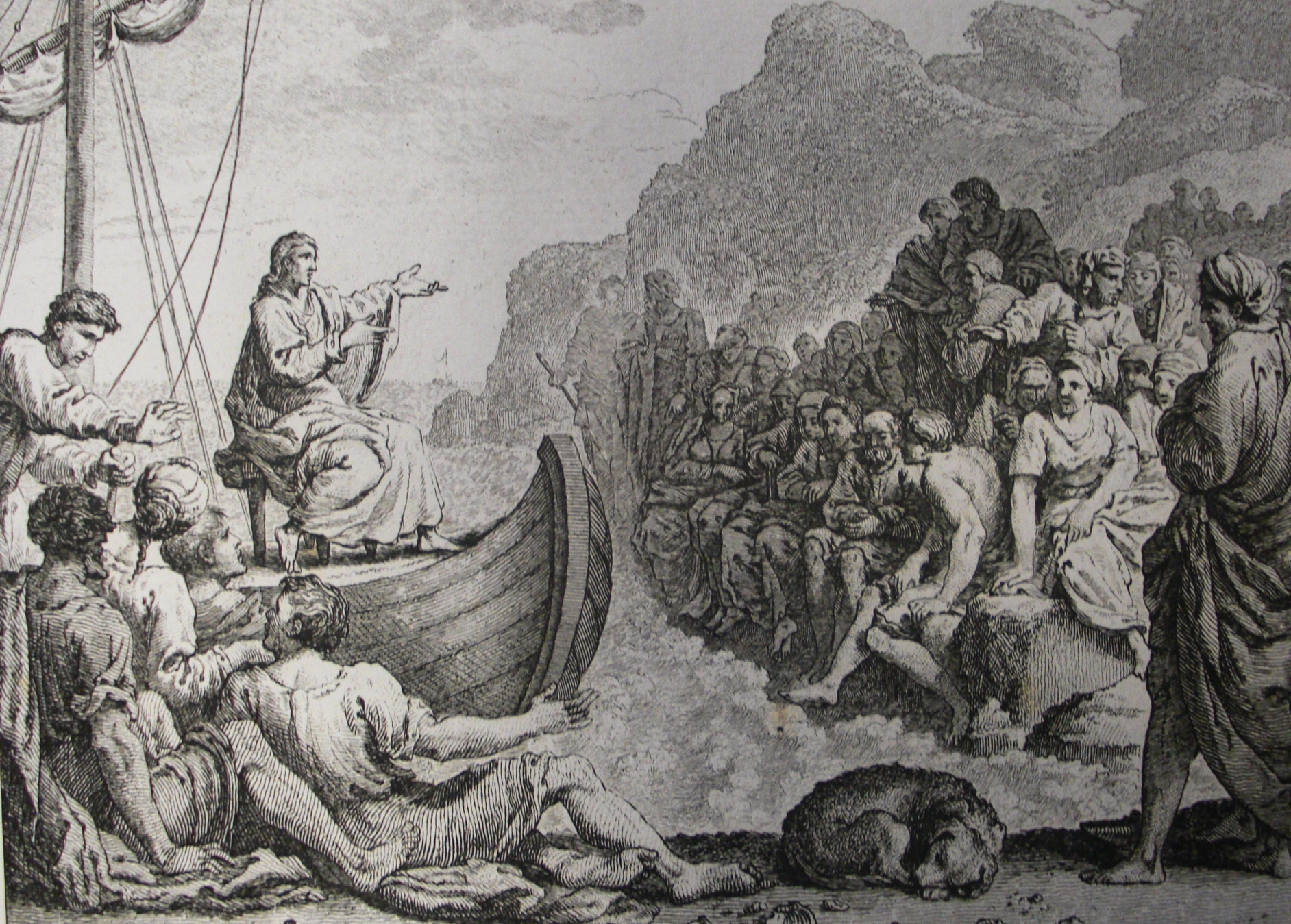
A print from the Phillip Medhurst Collection of Bible illustrations (Dutch Bible)

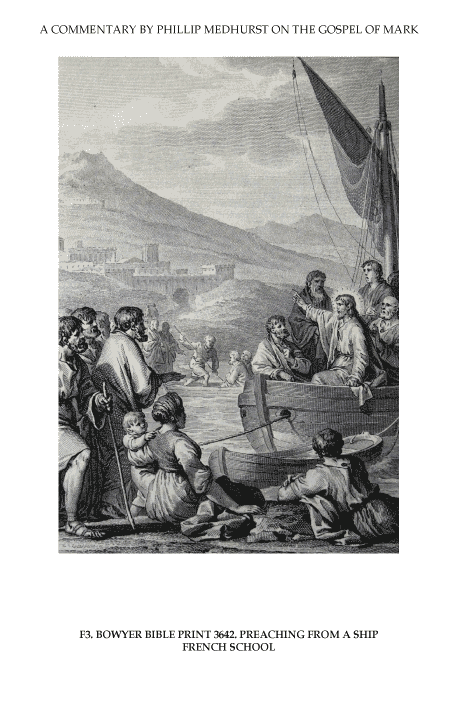
Preaching from a ship. French School. In the Bowyer Bible in Bolton Museum

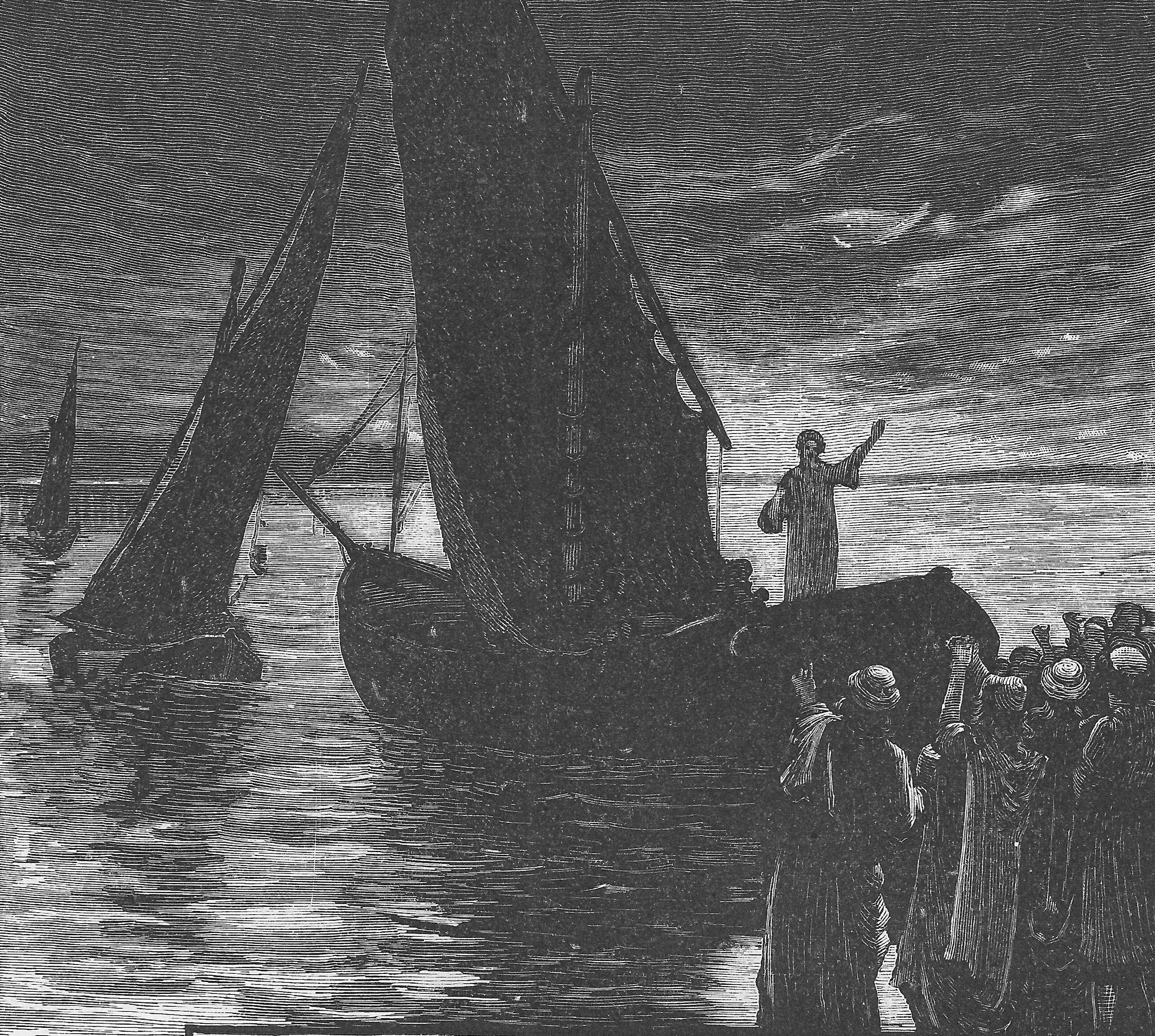
Jesus preaching from a boat near shore. W. J. Morgan (1890)

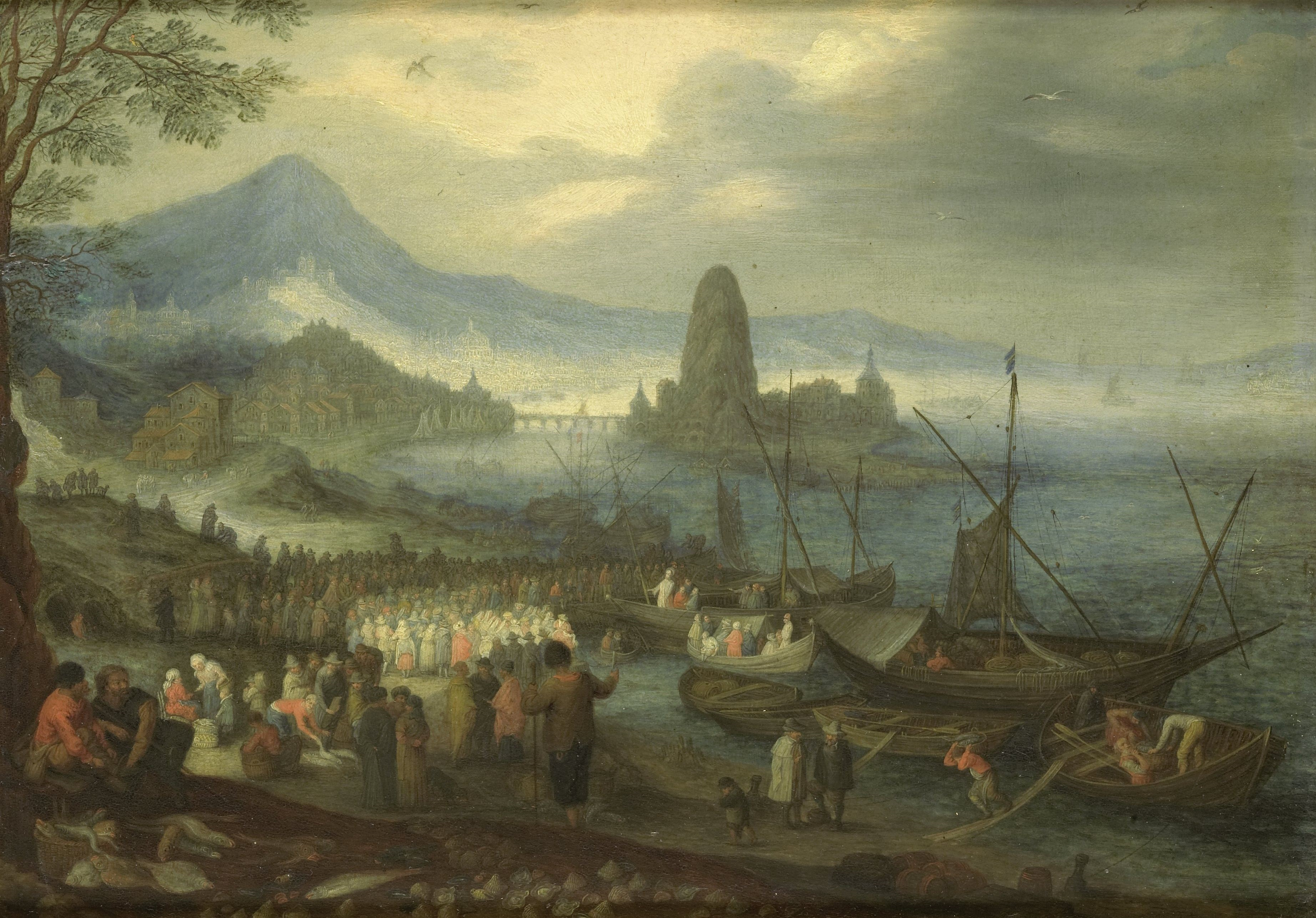
Extensive landscape with Christ standing on a fishing boat (1600–1700)

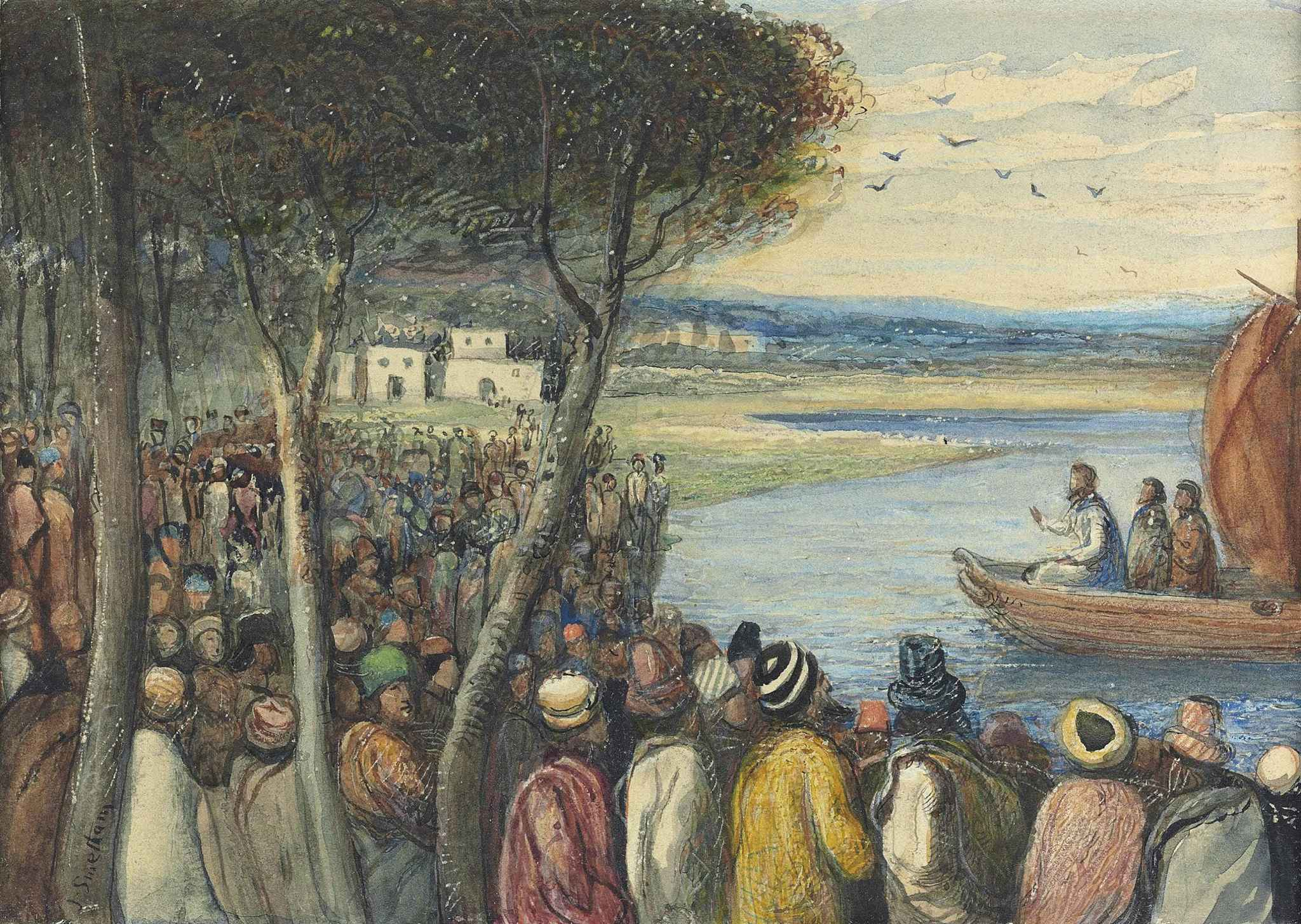
Pencil, pen and black ink, watercolour and bodycolour painting by J. Smetham.

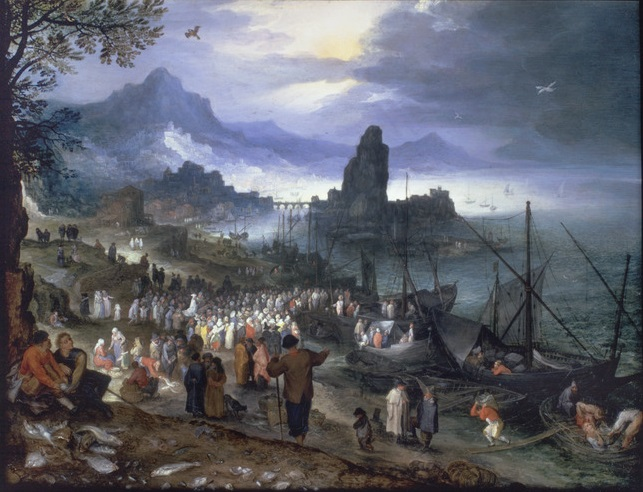
Jan Brueghel the Elder, The Sermon on the Sea of Galilee, 1597

== See also ==
- Life of Jesus in the New Testament
- Ministry of Jesus
- Calling of the disciples
- Parables of Jesus
- Miraculous catch of fish
- Sea of Galilee Boat
