= Matthew 12:47 =

- ← 12:46 12:48 →
- Book: Gospel of Matthew
- Christian Bible part: New Testament

Matthew 12:47 is the 47th verse in the twelfth chapter of the Gospel of Matthew in the New Testament.

== Content ==
In the original Greek according to the Textus Receptus, this verse is:

ειπεν δε τις αυτω ιδου η μητηρ σου και οι αδελφοι σου εξω εστηκασιν ζητουντες σοι λαλησαι.

This verse is missing from Codex Sinaiticus and Codex Vaticanus, from Codex Regius, which often follows these two codices, and from the Westcott-Hort translation.

In the King James Version of the Bible, the text reads:

Then one said unto him, Behold, thy mother and thy brethren stand without, desiring to speak with thee.

The New International Version translates the passage as:

Someone told him, "Your mother and brothers are standing outside, wanting to speak to you."

== Analysis ==
This person is believed to have been the messenger whom the brothers of Christ sent to call him out.

== Commentary from the Church Fathers ==
Jerome: "He that delivers this message, seems to me not to do it casually and without meaning, but as setting a snare for Him, whether He would prefer flesh and blood to the spiritual work; and thus the Lord refused to go out, not because He disowned His mother and His brethren, but that He might confound him that had laid this snare for Him."

Preceded by Matthew 12:46	Gospel of Matthew; Chapter 12	Succeeded by Matthew 12:48
