= The Sermon on the Sea of Galilee =

Painting by Jan Breughel the Elder

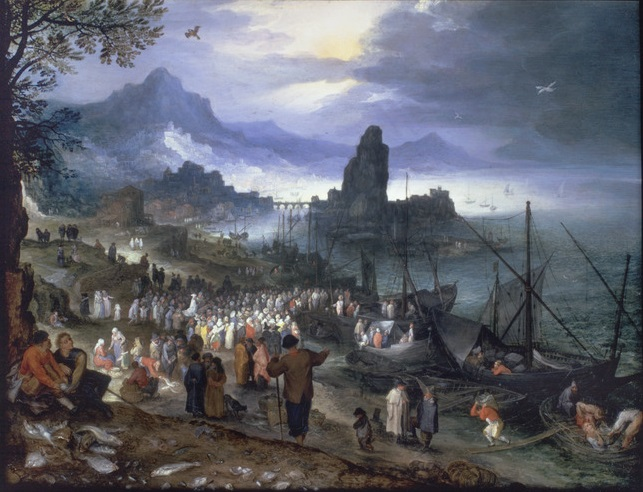
- Artist: Jan Brueghel the Elder
- Year: 1597
- Medium: oil paint, copper
- Dimensions: 26.4 cm (10.4 in) × 35.7 cm (14.1 in)

The Sermon on the Sea of Galilee is a painting by the Flemish painter Jan Breughel the Elder. It was painted in 1597. Its current whereabouts are unknown.

== Story ==
The story is taken from the Gospel of Luke, where it is told that Jesus gave a sermon by the Sea of Galilee and performed various miracles. On the banks of the lake a large group of people had gathered around Jesus to hear the word of God. Jesus went on board the fishing boat of Peter (who was then called Simon) and spoke to the people from it. After the sermon he challenged Simon and his fellow fishermen to travel out to the lake, where the Miraculous Catch of Fish then took place.

Jesus is pictured right in the middle of the painting with an aurora and lit by the sun, standing on Simon's boat with a few other followers. On the banks are there a large number of figures that are also partially lit by the sun. Close to their right fish are loaded into reed baskets from rowing boats, possibly a reference to the miraculous catch. At the front left, two figures rest against a tree with a display of different fish and shellfish in front of them. In the background a city is representing that just like the crowd of people is partially lit by the sun.

The image is a combination of motifs from the earlier work of Brueghel. The overall composition derives from the 1595 Coastal landscape with Jonah thrown overboard which was last seen in public during an auction at Sotheby's in London op 5 December 2018. The motifs of the two resting figures at the front left, the figure at the front lying on his back and the rowing boats being unladen come from the 1596 Harbour view with the departure of St Paul from Caesarea in the North Carolina Museum of Art in Raleigh.

== Provenance ==
The work was first catalogued in the 2002 Dutch and Flemish old master paintings of art dealer Johnny Van Haeften. It was last seen in public in the 2006 version of TEFAF.

== Related works ==
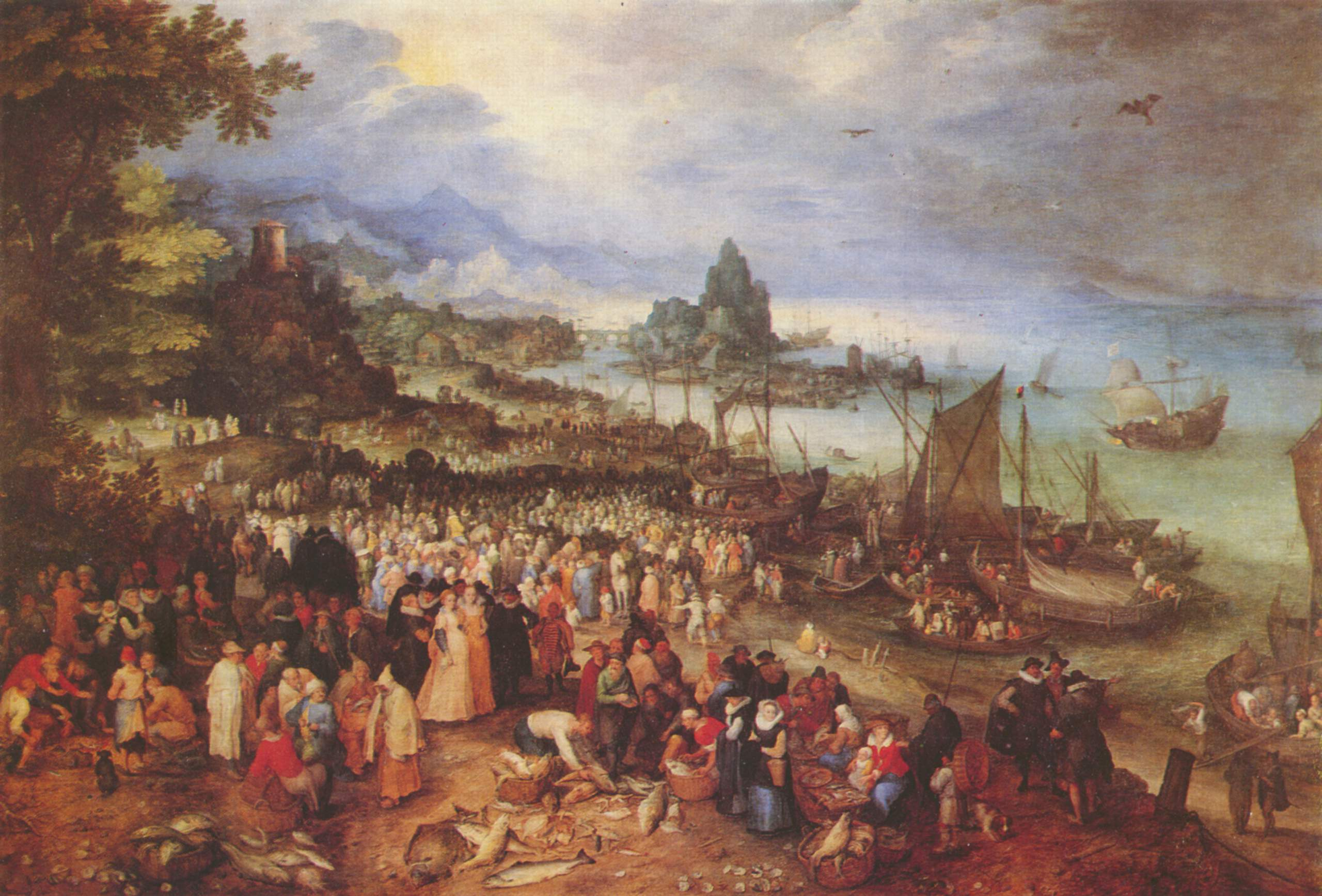
Jan Brueghel the Elder, Sea port with the lecture of Christ, Munich

A related painting is in the Bavarian State Painting Collections in Munich.
